= Aaron Ling Johanson =

American politician

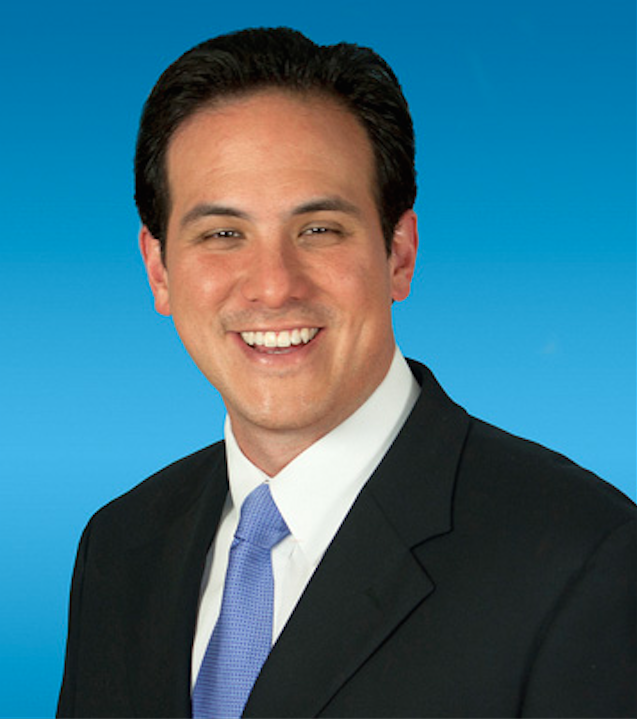

Minority Leader of the Hawaii House of Representatives
- In office January 16, 2013 – December 29, 2014
- Preceded by: Gene Ward
- Succeeded by: Beth Fukumoto

Member of the Hawaii House of Representatives from the 31st district 32nd (2010–2012)
- In office November 3, 2010 – November 8, 2022
- Preceded by: Lynn Finnegan
- Succeeded by: Redistricted

Personal details
- Born: January 30, 1980 (age 46) Montana, U.S.
- Party: Republican (before 2014); Democratic (2014–present)
- Education: Yale University (BA, History)

Aaron Ling Johanson (born January 30, 1980) is an American politician who served as a member of the Hawaii House of Representatives from 2010 to 2022, representing Aiea, Moanalua, Foster Village and Fort Shafter in Honolulu County on the island of Oahu.

He was originally elected as a Republican in 2010. He was re-elected as such in 2012 and 2014, serving as House Minority Whip from 2011 to 2013 and as House Minority Leader from 2013 to December 29, 2014, when he changed his party affiliation and joined the Democratic Party. He was re-elected as a Democrat in 2016, defeating his Republican opponent with 70% of the vote. Johanson announced in May 2022 that he would not run for re-election in the 2022 Hawaii House of Representatives election, leaving office at the end of his term.

== Early and personal life ==
Johanson was born in Montana. When he was six years old, his family moved to Hawaii, where his maternal grandparents had lived since 1959 and his grandfather worked as a shipfitter at Naval Station Pearl Harbor for over 30 years. Johanson graduated from Moanalua High School in Salt Lake on the island of Oahu and then from Yale University, where he received a BA in history. He then studied abroad at Hiroshima Shudo University, the Hokkaido International Foundation and at East China Normal University in Shanghai. He is fluent in Japanese and speaks some Chinese.

== Political career ==
Prior to elected office, Johanson served as the Deputy Chief of Staff at the United States Mint, a Deputy Associate Director in the White House Office of Presidential Personnel, a Deputy Chief of Staff to Lieutenant Governor of Hawaii Duke Aiona, a legislative analyst for State Representative Lynn Finnegan and the Commissioner of the Hawaii Legislative Federal Economic Stimulus Program Oversight Commission.

When Republican State Representative Lynn Finnegan of the 31st District retired to run for Lieutenant Governor of Hawaii in the 2010 election, Johanson ran to succeed her. He defeated Democrat Eleanor Lei Sharsh in the general election by 3,303 votes (56.4%) to 2,553 (43.6%). Shortly after being sworn in, he was elected by his Republican colleagues to serve as the House Minority Whip.

Johanson was redistricted to the 32nd District for the 2012 election. He defeated Democrat Eleanor Lei Sharsh in a rematch by 4,017 votes (65.21%) to 2,143 (34.79%). In 2013, he was elected House Minority Leader. Widely regarded to be a "rising star" in the Hawaii Republican Party, at just 32 years of age, he was the youngest person to hold the post in recent history.

He was re-elected in 2014, defeating Sharsh in a second rematch by 3,698 votes (71.81%) to 1,452 (28.19%).

After the 2014 elections, all eight Republicans in the State House were unable to organise because some of them wanted to replace Johanson as Minority Leader, saying that he was "too collaborative" with the Democrats. On December 29, 2014, he changed his party affiliation and joined the Democratic Party. He said that he had been increasingly at odds with Republican Party members, who had become "more narrow in their demands for ideological purity as well as in their demand for a combative tone and posture" and that rather than "being focused on remaining the loyal opposition as some would like", he "look[ed] forward to making a collaborative, constructive and positive difference."

Reaction to his decision in the Republican Party was mixed. State Representative Cynthia Thielen, the longest-serving Republican House member, cried when lamenting his move, blaming right-wing conservatives for pushing him out and saying that the Party had lost a "wonderful, moderate voice. And I'm very sorry about it." By contrast, Party Chairwoman Pat Saiki called his move "disgraceful" because he had been re-elected as a Republican less than two months prior, saying that it was "disappointing" that he was "willing to sacrifice his own political principals for his own ambition." Johanson replied that his decision had been a "gradual and deliberative one" over the last four years and said that many voters cast a ballot for him despite his being a Republican, not because of it. He was subsequently replaced by Beth Fukumoto as minority leader, who would later leave the party and join the Democrats herself for similar reasons in 2017.

Johanson was re-elected to a fourth term as a Democrat in the 2016 elections, defeating Republican opponent Eric Ching by 4,170 votes (70%) to 1,787 (30%).

Johanson announced at the end of the 2022 legislative session on May 5, 2022 that he will not run for re-election, and will leave public office to spend more time with his elderly parents.

== See also ==
- List of American politicians who switched parties in office
