= 2014 Hawaii gubernatorial election =

- November 4, 2014
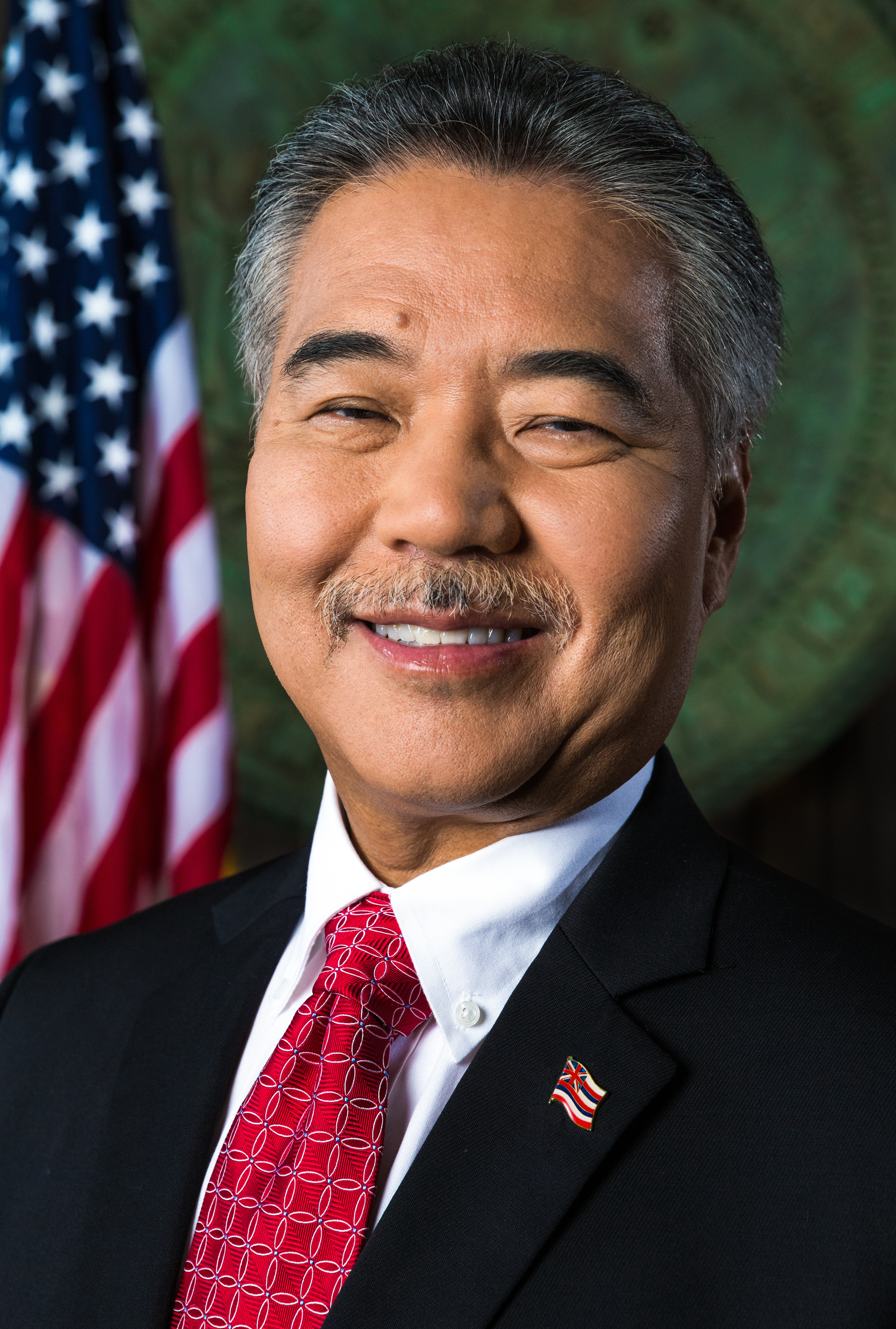

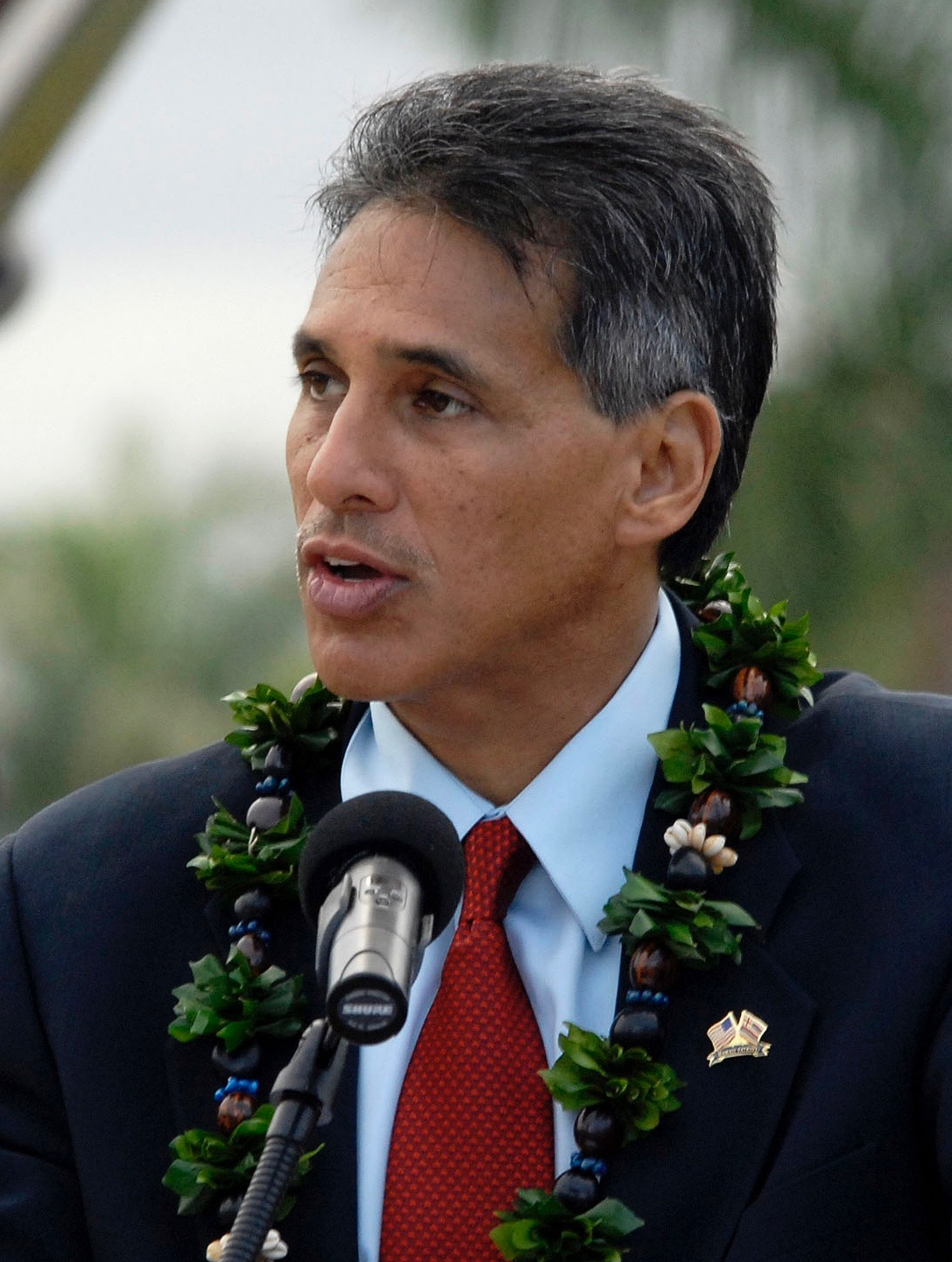

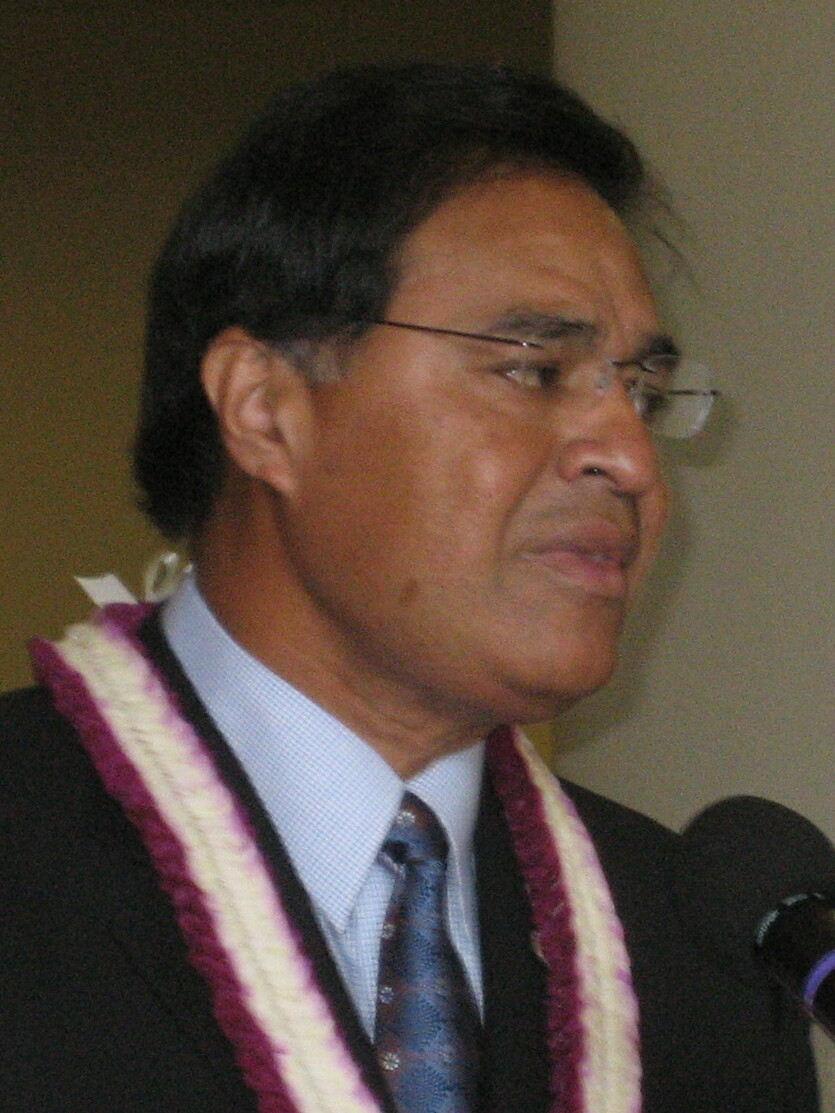
Nominee	David Ige	Duke Aiona	Mufi Hannemann
Party	Democratic	Republican	Independent
Running mate	Shan Tsutsui	Elwin Ahu	Les Chang
Popular vote	181,106	135,775	42,934
Percentage	49.45%	37.08%	11.72%
- Ige: 40–50% 50–60% 60–70% >90% Aiona: 40–50% 50–60% 60–70% 70–80% No votes
Governor before election
Neil Abercrombie
Democratic
Elected Governor
David Ige
Democratic

The 2014 Hawaii gubernatorial election took place on November 4, 2014, to elect the Governor of Hawaii, concurrently with a special election to Hawaii's Class III Senate Seat, as well as other elections to the United States Senate in other states and elections to the United States House of Representatives and various state and local elections.

Primary elections were held on August 9, 2014. In Hawaii, candidates for governor and lieutenant governor run in separate primaries and are then elected on the same ticket. Incumbent Democratic governor Neil Abercrombie ran for re-election to a second term in office, but was defeated by State Senator David Ige in the Democratic primary, making Abercrombie the first incumbent governor to lose renomination in Hawaii history. Incumbent Democratic lieutenant governor Shan Tsutsui was renominated.

The Republicans nominated former lieutenant governor Duke Aiona and pastor and former circuit court judge Elwin Ahu. Also running as an independent was former mayor of Honolulu Mufi Hannemann and former Honolulu parks and recreation director Les Chang. Ige and Tsutsui won the election.

This would be the last election until 2026 in which an elected incumbent state governor lost renomination. (Note: Governor Jeff Colyer of Kansas, who had taken office after the resignation of Sam Brownback, was defeated by Kris Kobach in the 2018 Republican primary election.)

== Democratic primary ==
=== Governor ===
==== Candidates ====
Declared

- Neil Abercrombie, incumbent governor
- David Ige, state senator
- Van K. Tanabe, candidate for governor in 2010

Declined

- Ed Case, former U.S. Representative and candidate for the U.S. Senate in 2006 and 2012

==== Endorsements ====
Neil Abercrombie

Individuals

- Barack Obama, President of the United States

Organizations

- International Brotherhood of Electrical Workers Local 1186
- International Brotherhood of Electrical Workers Local 1260
- International Brotherhood of Electrical Workers Local 1357
David Ige

Individuals

- George Ariyoshi, former Governor
- Ben Cayetano, former Governor

==== Debates ====
- Complete video of debate, July 4, 2014 - YouTube

==== Polling ====
Poll source	Date(s) administered	Sample size	Margin of error	Neil Abercrombie	David Ige	Other	Undecided
Ward Research	July 21–29, 2014	458	± 4.6%	36%	54%	—	11%
Civil Beat	July 24–28, 2014	895	± 3.3%	41%	51%	—	8%
Public Policy Polling	July 23–24, 2014	410	± ?	39%	49%	—	12%
Civil Beat	June 7–9, 2014	729	± 3.6%	37%	48%	—	15%
SMS Research*	March 24–April 25, 2014	1,402	± 2.6%	42%	28%	—	30%
Civil Beat	February 12–15, 2014	643	± 3.9%	37%	37%	—	26%
Ward Research	January 29–February 3, 2014	528	± 4.3%	47%	38%	—	14%

- * Internal poll for Neil Abercrombie campaign

==== Results ====
Results by county: Map legend: Ige—70–80%; Ige—60–70%; Ige—50–60%

Democratic primary results
Party	Candidate	Votes	%
Democratic	David Ige	157,050	66.01
Democratic	Neil Abercrombie (incumbent)	73,507	30.09
Democratic	Van Tanabe	2,622	1.01
Democratic	Blank vote	4,614	1.94
Democratic	Over vote	124	0.05
Total votes		237,917	100.00

=== Lieutenant governor ===
Brian Schatz won the Democratic primary for lieutenant governor in 2010 with 37% of the vote and was elected alongside Abercrombie. After the death of U.S. Senator Daniel Inouye in December 2012, Abercrombie appointed Schatz to succeed him in the Senate. Schatz resigned as lieutenant governor and was succeeded by Shan Tsutsui, the president of the Hawaii Senate.

==== Candidates ====
Declared

- Clayton Hee, state senator, candidate for lieutenant governor in 2002 and candidate for Hawaii's 2nd congressional district in 2006
- Shan Tsutsui, incumbent lieutenant governor

==== Results ====
Results by county: Map legend: Tsutsui—70–80%; Tsutsui—50–60%

Democratic primary results
Party	Candidate	Votes	%
Democratic	Shan Tsutsui (incumbent)	120,779	50.77
Democratic	Clayton Hee	81,255	34.15
Democratic	Mary Zanakis	18,174	7.64
Democratic	Miles Shiratori	2,593	1.09
Democratic	Sam Puletasi	2,126	0.89
Democratic	Blank vote	12,850	5.04
Democratic	Over vote	139	0.06
Total votes		237,916	100.00

== Republican primary ==
=== Governor ===
==== Candidates ====
Declared

- Duke Aiona, former lieutenant governor and nominee for governor in 2010

Declined

- Charles Djou, former U.S. Representative (running for HI-01)
- Mufi Hannemann, Democratic former mayor of Honolulu, candidate for governor in 2010 and candidate for HI-02 in 2012 (running as an Independent)

=== Endorsements ===
Duke Aiona
- Manny Pacquiao

==== Results ====
Results by county: Map legend: Aiona—>90%

Republican primary results
Party	Candidate	Votes	%
Republican	Duke Aiona	41,832	94.77
Republican	Stuart Todd Gregory	640	1.45
Republican	Charles (Trump) Collins	580	1.31
Republican	Blank vote	1,054	2.39
Republican	Over vote	36	0.08
Total votes		44,142	100.00

=== Lieutenant governor ===
==== Candidates ====
Declared

- Elwin Ahu, pastor and former circuit court judge
- Warner "Kimo" Sutton, businessman

Declined

- David Chang, former chairman of the Hawaii Republican Party

==== Results ====
Republican primary results
Party	Candidate	Votes	%
Republican	Elwin Ahu	27,678	62.07
Republican	Warner "Kimo" Sutton	11,511	26.08
Republican	Blank vote	4,921	11.15
Republican	Over vote	32	0.07
Total votes		44,142	100.00

== Libertarian nomination ==
=== Governor ===
==== Candidates ====
Declared

- Jeff Davis, solar contractor and radio show host

==== Results ====
Libertarian primary results
Party	Candidate	Votes	%
Libertarian	Jeff Davis	587	82.56
Libertarian	Blank vote	124	17.44
Total votes		711	100.00

=== Lieutenant governor ===
==== Candidates ====
Declared

- Cynthia (Lahi) Marlin

==== Results ====
Libertarian primary results
Party	Candidate	Votes	%
Libertarian	Cynthia (Lahi) Marlin	555	78.06
Libertarian	Blank vote	156	21.94
Total votes		711	100.00

== Hawaii Independent primary ==
=== Governor ===
==== Candidates ====
Declared

- Mufi Hannemann, Democratic former mayor of Honolulu, candidate for governor in 2010 and candidate for Hawaii's 2nd congressional district in 2012

==== Results ====
Independent Party primary results
Party	Candidate	Votes	%
Independent	Mufi Hannemann	2,103	88.62
Independent	Blank vote	269	11.34
Independent	Over vote	1	0.04
Total votes		2,373	100.00

=== Lieutenant governor ===
==== Candidates ====
Declared

- Running mate: Les Chang, former Honolulu parks and recreation director

==== Results ====
Independent Party primary results
Party	Candidate	Votes	%
Independent	Les Chang	1,370	57.73
Independent	Blank vote	1,002	42.23
Independent	Over vote	1	0.04
Total votes		2,373	100.00

== No Party primary ==
Hawaii has strict criteria for independent candidates seeking to participate in the general election. Three of the four candidates were disqualified for not having a running mate. The other candidate also had no running mate, but had already withdrawn from the race. They all still appeared on the ballot, alongside a notice about their status.

=== Candidates ===
==== Disqualified ====
- Misty Davis
- Khis Dejean Caldwell
- Richard Morse

==== Withdrew ====
- Joe Spatola

=== Results ===
Independent primary results
Party	Candidate	Votes	%
Independent	Misty Davis	201	18.03
Independent	Richard Morse	98	8.79
Independent	Khis Dejean Caldwell	85	7.62
Independent	Joe Spatola	40	3.59
Independent	Blank vote	687	61.61
Independent	Over vote	4	0.36
Total votes		1,115	100.00

== General election ==
=== Debates ===
- Complete video of debate, September 26, 2014 - YouTube
- Complete video of debate, October 9, 2014 - YouTube
- Complete video of debate, October 15, 2014 - C-SPAN

=== Predictions ===
Source	Ranking	As of
The Cook Political Report	Lean D	November 3, 2014
Sabato's Crystal Ball	Likely D	November 3, 2014
Rothenberg Political Report	Lean D	November 3, 2014
Real Clear Politics	Likely D	November 3, 2014

=== Polling ===
Poll source	Date(s) administered	Sample size	Margin of error	David Ige (D)	Duke Aiona (R)	Mufi Hannemann (I)	Other	Undecided
CBS News/NYT/YouGov	October 16–23, 2014	1,002	± 6%	54%	22%	5%	0%	19%
Civil Beat	October 16–19, 2014	1,221	± 2.8%	40%	34%	11%	6%	8%
Civil Beat	October 16–19, 2014	1,221	± 2.8%	27%	26%	—	—	47%
Tarrance Group/RGA	October 2014	800	± 3.5%	39%	36%	12%	3%	11%
Ward Research	October 11–18, 2014	605	± 4%	47%	35%	12%	1%	6%
Global Strategy Group	October 3–8, 2014	600	± 4%	45%	33%	10%	2%	10%
CBS News/NYT/YouGov	September 20 – October 1, 2014	1,319	± 4%	41%	35%	6%	0%	18%
Civil Beat	September 11–14, 2014	1,055	± 3%	43%	39%	8%	2%	8%
Civil Beat	September 11–14, 2014	1,055	± 3%	48%	45%	—	—	7%
Rasmussen Reports	September 9–10, 2014	750	± 4%	40%	39%	14%	2%	6%
CBS News/NYT/YouGov	August 18 – September 2, 2014	655	± 6%	37%	35%	6%	2%	20%
Ward Research	July 21–29, 2014	612	± 4%	34%	41%	15%	—	10%
Civil Beat	June 7–9, 2014	1,078	± 3%	31%	31%	17%	—	21%
Ward Research	January 29 – February 3, 2014	642	± 3.9%	34%	51%	—	—	15%

Hypothetical polling

Poll source	Date(s) administered	Sample size	Margin of error	Neil Abercrombie (D)	Duke Aiona (R)	Mufi Hannemann (I)	Other	Undecided
Ward Research	July 21–29, 2014	612	± 4%	30%	45%	14%	—	11%
CBS News/NYT/YouGov	July 5–24, 2014	1,083	± 3%	37%	40%	—	14%	7%
Civil Beat	June 7–9, 2014	1,078	± 3%	27%	33%	18%	—	22%
Ward Research	January 29 – February 3, 2014	642	± 3.9%	40%	48%	—	—	12%

=== Results ===
2014 Hawaii gubernatorial election
Party	Candidate	Votes	%	±%
Democratic	David Ige	181,106	49.45%	−9.16%
Republican	Duke Aiona	135,775	37.08%	−4.31%
Independent	Mufi Hannemann	42,934	11.72%	N/A
Libertarian	Jeff Davis	6,395	1.75%	N/A
Total votes		366,210	100.00%	N/A
Democratic hold				

==== By county ====
By county

County	David Ige Democratic		Duke Aiona Republican		All Others	
County	#	%	#	%	#	%
Hawaii	25,674	51.54%	15,387	30.89%	8,751	17.57%
Honolulu	119,312	48.12%	100,279	40.44%	28,381	11.45%
Kauaʻi	12,451	53.14%	7,495	31.99%	3,483	14.77%
Maui	23,699	52.6%	12,614	28.03%	8,714	19.36%
Totals	181,106	49.45%	135,775	37.08%	49,329	13.47%
