= Lynn Finnegan =

American politician (born 1970)

Chair of the Hawaii Republican Party
- In office November 20, 2021 – January 31, 2023
- Preceded by: Signe Godfrey
- Succeeded by: Diamond Garcia

Minority Leader of the Hawaii House of Representatives
- In office November 1, 2005 – January 19, 2011
- Preceded by: Galen Fox
- Succeeded by: Gene Ward

Member of the Hawaii House of Representatives from the 32nd district
- In office January 2003 – January 19, 2011
- Preceded by: Bob McDermott
- Succeeded by: Aaron Ling Johanson

Personal details
- Born: October 3, 1970 (age 55) Honolulu, Hawaii, U.S.
- Party: Republican
- Spouse: Peter Finnegan
- Education: University of Hawaiʻi at Mānoa

Lynn G. Berbano Finnegan (born October 3, 1970) is an American politician who served as a Republican member of the Hawaii House of Representatives representing the state's 32nd district from 2003 to 2011. The district includes the Lower Pearlridge, Aiea, Halawa, Hickam, Pearl Harbor and Moanalua Gardens on the island of Oahu.

In 2005, Finnegan was selected to be the Minority Leader for the Republican members of the State House. She was re-selected as such in 2007 and 2009.

In 2008, the Aspen Institute's Rodel Fellowships in Public Leadership selected Representative Lynn Finnegan as one of 24 elected public officials as its 2008 class of Fellows. Each member of the class was selected on their reputation for intellect, thoughtfulness, and bipartisan approach to governing. The class is evenly divided between Republicans and Democrats and represents Fellows from 22 states, serving at both local and state levels of government.

In 2009, Finnegan voted against HB 444, a Hawaii civil union bill. She said, "If we push to have government certify or make legal a union or marriage between the same sex, I believe that we push what is accepted to what will be promoted."

In 2009, Finnegan was selected as one of the 100 Most Influential Filipina Women in the U.S. An award by the Filipina Women's Network. Representative Finnegan was awarded in the Policymakers & Visionaries category which recognize Filipina women leaders who have made or are making a difference in government policies or laws that impact business, industry, and society and who enrich the lives and careers of others by sharing the benefits of their wealth, experience, and knowledge.

Finnegan declined to run for re-election in 2010, instead running for Lieutenant Governor of Hawaii in the 2010 election. She won the Republican primary and joined gubernatorial candidate Duke Aiona in the general election as his running mate. The Republican ticket was defeated by Democratic nominees Neil Abercrombie and Brian Schatz.

== Recent career ==
Finnegan currently serves as Assistant Head of Schools at Hanalani Schools, her alma mater. She had previously worked at Waialae Elementary School, Voyager Charter School, and Hawaii Public Charter Schools.

Party political offices
Preceded by Duke Aiona	Republican nominee for Lieutenant Governor of Hawaii; 2010	Succeeded by Elwin Ahu
Preceded by Signe Godfrey	Chair of the Hawaii Republican Party; 2021–2023	Succeeded by Diamond Garcia
