= 2016 United States presidential election in Hawaii =

- November 8, 2016
- Turnout: 58.4% ▼3.3 pp

Nominee	Hillary Clinton	Donald Trump
Party	Democratic	Republican
Home state	New York	New York
Running mate	Tim Kaine	Mike Pence
Electoral vote	3 (Note: All four of Hawaii's electors were pledged to the Clinton–Kaine ticket. One faithless elector instead cast a presidential ballot for Bernie Sanders and a vice-presidential ballot for Elizabeth Warren, so Clinton received three electoral votes and Sanders received one.)	0
Popular vote	266,891	128,847
Percentage	62.22%	30.04%

Clinton
40–50%
50–60%
60–70%
70–80%
80–90%
Trump
40–50%
50–60%
Tie/No votes
President before election
Barack Obama
Democratic
Elected President
Donald Trump
Republican

Treemap of the popular vote by county.

The 2016 United States presidential election in Hawaii was held on Tuesday, November 8, 2016, as part of the 2016 United States presidential election in which all 50 states and the District of Columbia participated. Hawaii voters chose four electors to represent the state in the Electoral College by popular vote.

Former Secretary of State Hillary Clinton and her running mate, Virginia Senator Tim Kaine, defeated New York businessman Donald Trump and his running mate, Indiana Governor Mike Pence, by 32.18 percentage points. Clinton carried Hawaii with 62.22% of the vote — her highest share in any state — though her margin was substantially smaller than Barack Obama's 70.55% in 2012. Trump received 30.04% of the vote, an improvement of about 2.2 points over Mitt Romney's 2012 performance. Hawaii was one of only two states — the other being Massachusetts — in which Clinton carried every county. The state also produced Green Party nominee Jill Stein's strongest result of any state, at 2.97%.

Exit polling reported by Honolulu Civil Beat indicated that Clinton dominated among Hawaii's large Asian American electorate, while Trump performed comparatively better with white voters, Native Hawaiians and other Pacific Islanders, and households with a connection to the U.S. military.

Although all four of Hawaii's electors had pledged to support the Clinton–Kaine ticket, one faithless elector, Honolulu activist David Mulinix, cast his presidential ballot for Bernie Sanders and his vice-presidential ballot for Elizabeth Warren. The remaining three electors voted as pledged.

== Background ==
Hawaii has been a reliably Democratic state in presidential elections since the late 1980s, voting Democratic in every cycle from 1988 onward. The state's most prominent political figure of the modern era, Barack Obama, was born in Honolulu and graduated from Punahou School; he carried Hawaii in 2008 with 71.85% — the highest share for any major-party nominee in any state — and again in 2012 with 70.55%. Heading into the 2016 cycle, every major election forecaster rated Hawaii as a safe Democratic state, and neither major-party nominee mounted a meaningful contest for its four electoral votes.

== Caucuses ==
=== Democratic caucuses ===
The Democratic Party of Hawaii held its presidential caucuses on March 26, 2016. Four candidates appeared on the ballot:

- Bernie Sanders
- Hillary Clinton
- Rocky De La Fuente
- Martin O'Malley (withdrawn)

Sanders defeated Clinton by a roughly two-to-one margin (about 69.8% to 30.0%) in the caucus vote and won the majority of pledged delegates to the 2016 Democratic National Convention. Delegates were allocated proportionally at both the statewide and congressional district levels.

2016 Democratic Party's presidential nominating process in Hawaii – Summary of results –
Candidate	Popular vote		Estimated delegates		
Candidate	Count	Percentage	Pledged	Unpledged	Total
Bernie Sanders	23,530	69.8%	17	2	19
Hillary Clinton	10,125	30.0%	8	5	13
Rocky De La Fuente	12	0.0%			
Martin O'Malley (withdrawn)	6	0.0%			
Uncommitted	43	0.1%	0	2	2
Total	33,716	100%	25	9	34

=== Republican caucuses ===
The Hawaii Republican Party held its presidential caucuses on March 8, 2016. Twelve candidates appeared on the ballot, several of whom had already suspended their campaigns by the time of the caucus:

- Donald Trump
- Ted Cruz
- Marco Rubio
- John Kasich
- Jeb Bush (withdrawn)
- Ben Carson (withdrawn)
- Chris Christie (withdrawn)
- Carly Fiorina (withdrawn)
- Lindsey Graham (withdrawn)
- Mike Huckabee (withdrawn)
- Rand Paul (withdrawn)
- Rick Santorum (withdrawn)

Trump finished first with about 42.4% of the vote, followed by Cruz (32.7%), Rubio (13.2%), and Kasich (10.6%). Pledged delegates to the 2016 Republican National Convention were awarded proportionally at the statewide and congressional district levels.

Hawaii Republican precinct caucuses, March 8, 2016
Candidate	Votes	Percentage	Actual delegate count		
Candidate	Votes	Percentage	Bound	Unbound	Total
Donald Trump	6,805	43.32%	11	0	11
Ted Cruz	5,063	32.23%	7	0	7
Marco Rubio	2,068	13.17%	1	0	1
John Kasich	1,566	9.97%	0	0	0
Ben Carson (withdrawn)	146	0.93%	0	0	0
Jeb Bush (withdrawn)	24	0.15%	0	0	0
Write-In	25	0.16%	0	0	0
Spoiled	11	0.07%	0	0	0
Unprojected delegates:			0	0	0
Total:	15,708	100.00%	19	0	19
Source: The Green Papers

== General election ==
=== Campaign ===
Neither major-party nominee made an in-person campaign appearance in Hawaii during the general election, and very little broadcast advertising was purchased in the state by either side. With the state consistently rated "Safe Democratic" by every major forecaster, both campaigns concentrated their resources on contiguous swing states; Hawaii's geographic isolation and modest electoral vote count further reduced its strategic value. Surrogates for the Clinton campaign — including First Lady Michelle Obama and Senator Bernie Sanders — appeared at fundraisers and rallies in the islands earlier in the cycle, but no comparable Trump campaign events were held.

=== Predictions ===
Source	Ranking	As of
Los Angeles Times	Safe D	November 6, 2016
CNN	Safe D	November 4, 2016
Cook Political Report	Safe D	November 7, 2016
Electoral-vote.com	Safe D	November 8, 2016
Rothenberg Political Report	Safe D	November 7, 2016
Sabato's Crystal Ball	Safe D	November 7, 2016
RealClearPolitics	Safe D	November 8, 2016
Fox News	Safe D	November 7, 2016

=== Results ===
State Senate district results

2016 United States presidential election in Hawaii
Party	Candidate	Running mate	Votes	Percentage	Electoral votes
Democratic	Hillary Clinton	Tim Kaine	266,891	62.22%	3
Republican	Donald Trump	Mike Pence	128,847	30.04%	0
Libertarian	Gary Johnson	William Weld	15,954	3.72%	0
Green	Jill Stein	Ajamu Baraka	12,737	2.97%	0
Constitution	Darrell Castle	Scott Bradley	4,508	1.05%	0
Democratic (Note: Cast by Hawaii's faithless elector David Mulinix, who was pledged to Clinton but voted for Sanders for president and Warren for vice president. Sanders and Warren did not appear on the Hawaii general-election ballot and received no popular votes.)	Bernie Sanders	Elizabeth Warren	—	—	1
Totals			428,937	100.00%	4

==== By county ====
County	Hillary Clinton Democratic		Donald Trump Republican		Various candidates Other parties		Margin		Total votes cast
County	#	%	#	%	#	%	#	%	Total votes cast
Hawaii	41,259	63.61%	17,501	26.98%	6,107	9.41%	23,758	36.63%	64,867
Honolulu	175,696	61.48%	90,326	31.61%	19,768	6.91%	85,370	29.87%	285,790
Kalawao	14	70.00%	1	5.00%	5	25.00%	13	65.00%	20
Kauaʻi	16,456	62.49%	7,574	28.76%	2,305	8.75%	8,882	33.73%	26,335
Maui	33,480	64.45%	13,446	25.89%	5,019	9.66%	20,034	38.56%	51,945
Totals	266,891	62.22%	128,847	30.04%	33,199	7.74%	138,044	32.18%	428,937

Note: Sums of county-level results differ slightly (by roughly 20 votes) from the certified statewide totals reported by the Hawaii Office of Elections due to ballot-reconciliation differences for overseas and military absentee returns.

==== By congressional district ====
Clinton carried both of Hawaii's congressional districts.

District	Clinton	Trump	Representative
1st	63%	31%	Colleen Hanabusa
2nd	61%	30%	Tulsi Gabbard

== Analysis ==
Although Clinton's 32-point margin made Hawaii one of her strongest states, it represented a clear narrowing relative to the Obama-era results: the Democratic share fell by more than eight percentage points from 2012, while the Republican share rose by about 2.2 points. Local commentators attributed Trump's relative gains to a combination of the state's substantial military and veteran communities, segments of the Native Hawaiian and Pacific Islander electorate that had not been strongly Democratic-aligned in earlier cycles, and a national environment that was less favorable to the Democratic nominee than the cycles in which Obama had run.

Hawaii was one of only two states — alongside Massachusetts — in which Clinton carried every county. It was also the strongest state in the country for Green Party nominee Jill Stein, who received 2.97% of the vote, narrowly missing the 3% threshold she did not clear in any state.

The state contributed the only faithless presidential elector from a Clinton-pledged slate. David Mulinix, a Honolulu activist, told the Associated Press that he had cast his presidential ballot for Sanders to draw attention to perceived inequities in the Electoral College and to honor Sanders's strong showing in Hawaii's Democratic caucuses.

== Aftermath ==
Hawaii's strong Democratic alignment continued in subsequent presidential elections. In 2020, Joe Biden defeated Trump 63.73% to 34.27%, and in 2024, Kamala Harris carried the state over Trump by a comparable margin. Hawaii has voted Democratic in every presidential election since 1988.

== See also ==
- 2016 Democratic Party presidential debates and forums
- 2016 Democratic Party presidential primaries
- 2016 Republican Party presidential debates and forums
- 2016 Republican Party presidential primaries
- Faithless electors in the 2016 United States presidential election
