= 2012 United States Senate election in Hawaii =

- November 6, 2012
- Turnout: 44.2% (voting eligible)
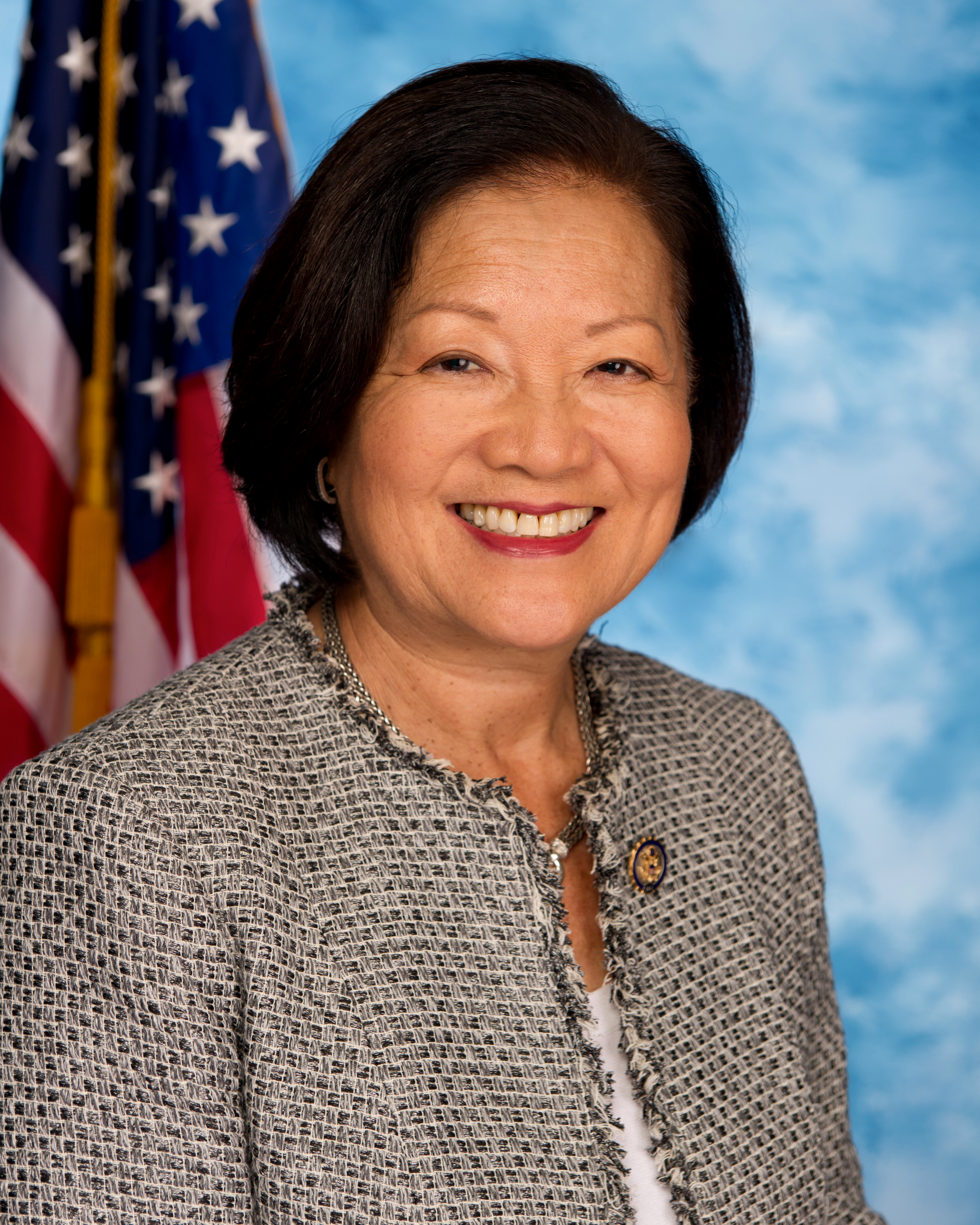

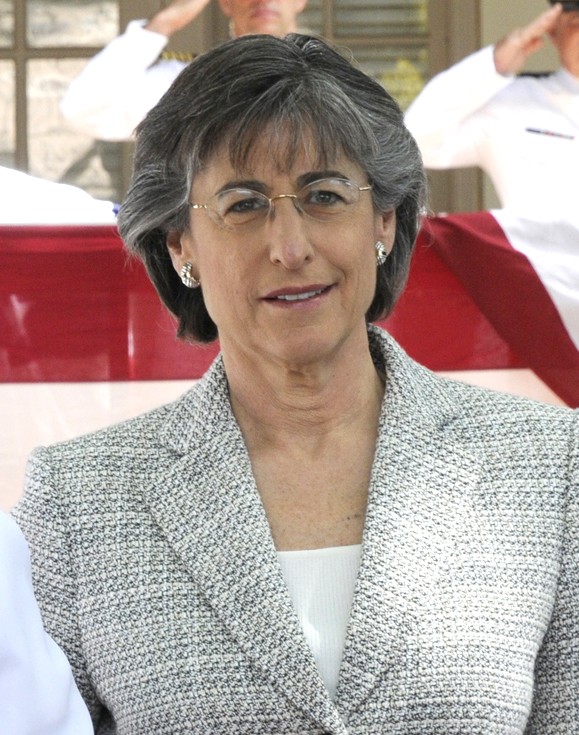
Nominee	Mazie Hirono	Linda Lingle
Party	Democratic	Republican
Popular vote	269,489	160,994
Percentage	62.60%	37.40%
- Hirono: 50–60% 60–70% 70–80% 80–90% >90% Lingle: 50–60% 60–70% Tie: 50% No votes
U.S. senator before election
Daniel Akaka
Democratic
Elected U.S. Senator
Mazie Hirono
Democratic

The 2012 United States Senate election in Hawaii took place on November 6, 2012, concurrently with the 2012 U.S. presidential election, as well as other elections to the United States Senate and House of Representatives and various state and local elections. Incumbent Democratic senator Daniel Akaka decided to retire instead of seeking a fourth full term. Democrat Mazie Hirono defeated Republican Linda Lingle. This was the first open Senate seat in the state of Hawaii since 1976.

This was a rematch of the 2002 Hawaii gubernatorial election, which Linda Lingle won 51.56% – 47.01%.

== Background ==
U.S. Representative Daniel Akaka was appointed by Governor John Waihee to the U.S. Senate to serve temporarily after the death of U.S. Senator Spark Matsunaga, and sworn into office on May 16, 1990. On November 6 of the same year, he was elected to complete the remaining four years of Matsunaga's unexpired term. He was re-elected in 1994 for a first full six-year term and again in 2000 and 2006. Despite originally saying he would seek re-election in 2012, on March 2, 2011, Akaka announced that he would not run for re-election.

== Democratic primary ==
The primary election was held on August 11. After being locked in a tight race with Ed Case, her predecessor in Congress, incumbent Congresswoman Mazie Hirono pulled away in the final vote, handily defeating Case.

=== Candidates ===
- Ed Case, former U.S. representative
- Michael Gillespie
- Antonio Gimbernat
- Mazie Hirono, U.S. representative and 2002 nominee for governor
- Arturo Reyes

=== Withdrew ===
- Daniel Akaka, incumbent U.S. Senator

=== Declined ===
- Tammy Duckworth, Assistant Secretary of Public/Intergovernmental Affairs (ran for Congress in Illinois)
- Colleen Hanabusa, U.S. Representative
- Mufi Hannemann, former mayor of Honolulu (ran for Congress)

=== Campaign ===
In December 2011, Democratic Senatorial Campaign Committee chairwoman and U.S. Senator Patty Murray for Washington endorsed Hirono. U.S. Senator and President Pro Tempore Daniel Inouye for Hawaii also endorsed her. Case criticized "D.C. insiders." He also argued that he is a fiscal moderate, while Hirono was rated the 6th most liberal member of the U.S. House. The Daily Kos blog described Ed Case as a "Democratic villain."

=== Polling ===
Poll source	Date(s) administered	Sample size	Margin of error	Ed Case	Mazie Hirono	Undecided
Public Policy Polling	October 13–16, 2011	368	±5.1%	40%	45%	15%
Civil Beat Poll	January 18–19, 2012	1,358	±2.7%	41%	39%	20%
Honolulu Star-Advertiser	January 26 – February 5, 2012	599	±4.0%	36%	56%	8%
Civil Beat Poll	June 5–7, 2012	731	±3.6%	46%	46%	8%
Honolulu Star-Advertiser	July 5–9, 2012	599	±4.0%	40%	43%	9%
Honolulu Star-Advertiser	July 12–21, 2012	606	±4.0%	37%	55%	8%
Civil Beat/Merriman River	July 31 – August 2, 2012	1,227	±2.8%	47%	46%	9%

=== Results ===
Results by county: Hirono—60–70% Hirono—50–60%

Democratic primary results
Party	Candidate	Votes	%
Democratic	Mazie Hirono	134,745	57%
Democratic	Ed Case	95,553	40%
	Blank Votes	3,331	1%
Democratic	Arturo Reyes	1,720	1%
Democratic	Michael Gillespie	1,104	1%
Democratic	Antonio Gimbernat	517	0.2%
	Over Votes	110	0%
Total votes		237,080	100%

== Republican primary ==
The primary election was held on August 11.

=== Candidates ===
- John Carroll, former state senator, former state representative and perennial candidate
- Charles Collins
- Linda Lingle, former governor
- Eddie Pirkowski, businessman and perennial candidate
- John Roco

=== Declined ===
- Duke Aiona, former lieutenant governor
- Charles Djou, former U.S. representative (running for U.S. House)

=== Polling ===
Poll source	Date(s) administered	Sample size	Margin of error	John Carroll	Linda Lingle	Undecided
Public Policy Polling	October 13–16, 2011	293	±5.7%	9%	85%	6%

=== Results ===
Republican primary results
Party	Candidate	Votes	%
Republican	Linda Lingle	44,252	90%
Republican	John Carroll	2,900	6%
	Blank Votes	749	2%
Republican	John Roco	545	1%
Republican	Charles Collins	366	1%
Republican	Eddie Pirkowski	232	0.5%
	Over Votes	25	0.1%
Total votes		49,069	100%

== General election ==
=== Candidates ===
- Heath Beasley (independent)
- Mazie Hirono (Democratic), U.S. representative
- Linda Lingle (Republican), former governor

=== Debates ===
- September 6, 2012 – Honolulu Japanese Chamber of Commerce and various other hosts
- October 8, 2012 – AARP Hawaii
- October 16, 2012 – Honolulu Civil Beat, Complete video of debate at C-SPAN
- October 18, 2012 – PBS Hawaii
- October 22, 2012 – Hawaii Star Advertiser

=== Fundraising ===
Candidate (party)	Receipts	Disbursements	Cash on hand	Debt
Mazie Hirono (D)	$5,518,572	$5,657,753	$77,323	$241,951
Linda Lingle (R)	$5,865,323	$5,839,282	$26,042	$194,534
Source: Federal Election Commission

==== Top contributors ====
Mazie Hirono	Contribution	Linda Lingle	Contribution
EMILY's List	$215,640	Goldman Sachs	$39,900
University of Hawaii	$29,900	Elliott Management Corporation	$39,500
Kobayashi, Sugita & Goda	$24,618	Humanscale Corporation	$34,000
Alexander & Baldwin	$23,100	Bank of America	$21,240
RM Towill Corp	$23,000	Richie's Specialty Pharmacy	$20,000
Weitz & Luxenberg	$22,400	Marriott International	$19,500
Council for a Livable World	$20,914	Murray Energy	$19,205
Nan, Inc.	$20,000	State of Hawaii	$18,350
Thornton & Naumes	$20,000	Devon Energy	$15,500
BNP Paribas	$17,250	Crown Associates Realty	$15,000
Source: OpenSecrets

==== Top industries ====
Mazie Hirono	Contribution	Linda Lingle	Contribution
Lawyers/law firms	$524,619	Retired	$640,433
Women's issues	$336,772	Financial institutions	$368,837
Retired	$194,307	Leadership PACs	$291,500
Leadership PACs	$186,500	Real estate	$249,216
Real estate	$123,598	Pro-Israel	$185,500
Transportation unions	$110,400	Health professionals	$154,550
Lobbyists	$109,344	Petroleum industry	$137,950
Public sector unions	$108,000	Misc. finance	$137,500
Democratic/liberal	$85,788	Lawyers/law firms	$135,086
Shipping industry	$85,385	Republican/conservative	$101,664
Source: OpenSecrets

=== Predictions ===
Source	Ranking	As of
The Cook Political Report	Lean D	November 1, 2012
Sabato's Crystal Ball	Likely D	November 5, 2012
Rothenberg Political Report	Likely D	November 2, 2012
Real Clear Politics	Likely D	November 5, 2012

=== Polling ===
Poll source	Date(s) administered	Sample size	Margin of error	Mazie Hirono (D)	Linda Lingle (R)	Undecided
Public Policy Polling	March 24–27, 2011	898	±3.3%	52%	40%	9%
Honolulu Star-Advertiser	May 4–10, 2011	614	±4.0%	57%	35%	8%
Public Policy Polling	October 13–16, 2011	568	±4.1%	48%	42%	10%
Civil Beat/Merriman River	January 18–19, 2012	1,358	±2.7%	46%	39%	16%
Honolulu Star-Advertiser	January 26 – February 5, 2012	771	±3.5%	57%	37%	5%
Public Policy Polling	May 16–17, 2012	600	±4.0%	50%	41%	9%
Civil Beat/Merriman River	June 5–7, 2012	1,105	±2.9%	49%	44%	5%
Honolulu Star-Advertiser	July 12–21, 2012	756	±3.6%	58%	39%	4%
Civil Beat/Merriman River	September 26–28, 2012	1,684	±2.4%	55%	39%	6%
Honolulu Star-Advertiser	October 15–22, 2012	786	±3.5%	57%	35%	8%
Civil Beat/Merriman River	October 24–26, 2012	1,218	±2.8%	55%	40%	5%

Hypothetical polling

Democratic primary

Poll source	Date(s) administered	Sample size	Margin of error	Ed Case	Colleen Hanabusa	Mufi Hannemann	Mazie Hirono	Brian Schatz	Don't Know/ Refused
Honolulu Star-Advertiser	May 4–10, 2011	403	±4.9%	26%	15%	17%	25%	6%	11%

with Duke Aiona

Poll source	Date(s) administered	Sample size	Margin of error	Ed Case (D)	Duke Aiona (R)	Undecided/Other
Public Policy Polling	March 24–27, 2011	898	±3.3%	50%	35%	15%

Poll source	Date(s) administered	Sample size	Margin of error	Mazie Hirono (D)	Duke Aiona (R)	Undecided/Other
Public Policy Polling	March 24–27, 2011	898	±3.3%	49%	42%	10%

with Colleen Hanabusa

Poll source	Date(s) administered	Sample size	Margin of error	Colleen Hanabusa (D)	Duke Aiona (R)	Undecided/Other
Public Policy Polling	March 24–27, 2011	898	±3.3%	48%	43%	9%

Poll source	Date(s) administered	Sample size	Margin of error	Colleen Hanabusa (D)	Charles Djou (R)	Undecided/Other
Public Policy Polling	March 24–27, 2011	898	±3.3%	50%	40%	10%

Poll source	Date(s) administered	Sample size	Margin of error	Colleen Hanabusa (D)	Linda Lingle (R)	Undecided/Other
Public Policy Polling	March 24–27, 2011	898	±3.3%	51%	40%	9%
Honolulu Star-Advertiser	May 4–10, 2011	614	±4.0%	54%	39%	7%

with Charles Djou

Poll source	Date(s) administered	Sample size	Margin of error	Ed Case (D)	Charles Djou (R)	Undecided/Other
Public Policy Polling	March 24–27, 2011	898	±3.3%	53%	35%	12%

Poll source	Date(s) administered	Sample size	Margin of error	Mazie Hirono (D)	Charles Djou (R)	Undecided/Other
Public Policy Polling	March 24–27, 2011	898	±3.3%	51%	40%	9%

With Mufi Hannemann

Poll source	Date(s) administered	Sample size	Margin of error	Mufi Hannemann (D)	Charles Djou (R)	Undecided/Other
Public Policy Polling	March 24–27, 2011	898	±3.3%	46%	40%	14%

Poll source	Date(s) administered	Sample size	Margin of error	Mufi Hannemann (D)	Duke Aiona (R)	Undecided/Other
Public Policy Polling	March 24–27, 2011	898	±3.3%	42%	42%	16%

Poll source	Date(s) administered	Sample size	Margin of error	Mufi Hannemann (D)	Linda Lingle (R)	Undecided/Other
Public Policy Polling	March 24–27, 2011	898	±3.3%	47%	40%	14%
Honolulu Star-Advertiser	May 4–10, 2011	614	±4.0%	51%	36%	13%

with Brian Schatz

Poll source	Date(s) administered	Sample size	Margin of error	Brian Schatz (D)	Linda Lingle (R)	Undecided/Other
Honolulu Star-Advertiser	May 4–10, 2011	614	±4.0%	47%	43%	10%

Poll source	Date(s) administered	Sample size	Margin of error	Ed Case (D)	John Carroll (R)	Undecided/Other
Public Policy Polling	October 13–16, 2011	568	±4.1%	60%	21%	18%

Poll source	Date(s) administered	Sample size	Margin of error	Ed Case (D)	Linda Lingle (R)	Undecided/Other
Public Policy Polling	March 24–27, 2011	898	±3.3%	52%	35%	12%
Honolulu Star-Advertiser	May 4–10, 2011	614	±4.0%	54%	36%	10%
Public Policy Polling	October 13–16, 2011	568	±4.1%	43%	45%	12%
Civil Beat/Merriman River	January 18–19, 2012	1,358	±2.7%	46%	33%	20%
Honolulu Star-Advertiser	January 26 – February 5, 2012	771	±3.5%	56%	36%	8%
Civil Beat/Merriman River	June 5–7, 2012	1,105	±2.9%	52%	36%	12%
Honolulu Star-Advertiser	July 12–21, 2012	756	±3.6%	56%	38%	6%

Poll source	Date(s) administered	Sample size	Margin of error	Mazie Hirono (D)	John Carroll (R)	Undecided/Other
Public Policy Polling	October 13–16, 2011	568	±4.1%	56%	29%	15%

=== Endorsements ===
Mazie Hirono (D)

U.S. representatives

- Don Young, U.S. representative from Alaska's at-large congressional district (Republican; endorsed only in the primary)

=== Results ===
United States Senate election in Hawaii, 2012
Party	Candidate	Votes	%	±%
Democratic	Mazie Hirono	269,489	62.60%	+1.25%
Republican	Linda Lingle	160,994	37.40%	+0.62%
Total votes		430,483	100.00%	N/A
Democratic hold				

==== By county ====
By county

County	Mazie Hirono Democratic		Linda Lingle Republican	
County	#	%	#	%
Hawaii	43,383	69.0%	19,491	31.0%
Honolulu	174,634	59.44%	119,176	40.56%
Kauaʻi	17,973	71.59%	7,134	28.41%
Maui	33,169	68.72%	15,096	31.28%
Totals	269,489	62.6%	160,994	37.4%

==== By congressional district ====
Hirono won both congressional districts.

District	Hirono	Lingle	Representative
1st	59.94%	40.06%	Colleen Hanabusa
2nd	65.24%	34.76%	Tulsi Gabbard

== See also ==
- 2012 United States Senate elections
- 2012 United States House of Representatives elections in Hawaii
