= Hawaii Republican Party =

Hawaii state party of the Republican Party

Republican Party of Hawaii ʻAoʻao Lepupalika o Hawaiʻi
- Chairperson: Shirlene Ostrov
- Senate Minority Leader: Samantha DeCorte
- House Minority Leader: Lauren Matsumoto
- Founded: May 2, 1900
- Merger of: Reform Party; Home Rule Party
- Preceded by: Reform Party
- Headquarters: Honolulu
- Ideology: Conservatism
- National affiliation: Republican Party
- Colors: Red
- State House: 6 / 51
- State Senate: 2 / 25
- Statewide Executive Offices: 0 / 2
- U.S. House of Representatives: 0 / 2
- U.S. Senate: 0 / 2

Election symbol

Website
- thehawaiirepublicanparty.com

The Hawaii Republican Party (HRP; Hawaiian: ʻAoʻao Lepupalika o Hawaiʻi) is the affiliate of the Republican Party (GOP) in Hawaii, headquartered in Honolulu. The party was strong during Hawaii's territorial days, but following the Hawaii Democratic Revolution of 1954 the Democratic Party came to dominate Hawaii. The party currently has little power and is the weakest state affiliate of the national Republican Party; it controls none of Hawaii's statewide or federal elected offices and has the least presence in the state legislature of any state Republican party.

== History ==
=== Republic ===
Following the overthrow of the Hawaiian Kingdom and the creation of the Republic of Hawaii, the American Union Party was created and as the Republic of Hawaii was a de facto one-party state, it faced virtually no opposition. On October 13, 1894, the American Union Party held its first convention, where it established the party's organization, created a platform, and nominated candidates for the 1894 elections. The party's official stance was in favor of annexation by the United States, although as the only legal party, anti-annexation factions were present within the party.

=== Territorial ===
After Hawaii was annexed on July 12, 1898, the majority of the American Union Party's members created the Hawaii Republican Party. On March 10, 1899, members of the American Union Party and former leaders of the Republic held a meeting where they decided to postpone the organization of a Republican Party and the creation of an auxiliary party organization.

On May 2, 1900, around one hundred men organized the Republican Party affiliate in Hawaii. The first Republican Convention was held on May 30, 1900. Temporary officers were selected, a platform was created, and delegates were chosen to send to the Republican National Convention in June.

Although a Democratic affiliate existed in the territory, it held little influence, while the pro-Native Hawaiian Home Rule Party emerged as the main opposition. In 1900, the Home Rule Party took control of the territorial legislature and its leader, Robert William Wilcox, was elected as Hawaii's non-voting delegate to the House of Representatives. Prior to the 1902 election, the Reform Party merged into the Hawaii Republican Party. The Home Rule Party split when Prince Jonah Kūhiō Kalanianaʻole left its convention on July 10 to form the Hui Kuokoa Party. Shortly afterward he joined the Republicans. In the following elections, the Republicans defeated Wilcox by running Prince Kalanianaʻole, taking control of the legislature with 26 of the 36 seats. Following this defeat, the Home Rule Party existed in a weakened form until 1912, when it fused with the Republicans. The Republican Party led the so-called "Haole-Hawaiian Alliance," with uninterrupted Legislative majorities until Democrats took control of the Legislature in 1954.

The Democratic Party of Hawaii was reorganized in 1902, but did not become influential until the 1920s, when it won multiple Honolulu mayoral elections and elected William Paul Jarrett as delegate to the House of Representatives. However, the Republican party retook the delegation to the House through the 1930s and 1940s, due to support from the Big Five sugar producers. A seminal moment in Hawaiian history, the power of the Big Five was weakened by the National Labor Relations Act of 1935, which lead to unionization on Hawaii's sugar plantations and ultimately the Democratic Revolution of 1954. In elections that year, the Republicans lost control of the territorial legislature for the first time since 1900, as the Democratic affiliate won nine of the fifteen territorial senate seats and twenty two of the thirty territorial house seats. The Democrats retained control of the legislature in the 1956 elections, before the Republicans retook control of the senate in 1958.

=== Statehood ===
On May 16, 1959, the affiliate held its first state convention where most of the officer positions went uncontested except for national committeewoman and where the candidates for the upcoming federal and state special elections. In the gubernatorial election incumbent Territorial Governor and Republican William F. Quinn won by 4,139 votes; in the Senate special elections Republican Hiram Fong won by 9,514 votes while Wilfred Tsukiyama was narrowly defeated by 4,577 votes; and Republicans lost the House in a landslide.

In the 1998 gubernatorial election, Maui Mayor Linda Lingle won the Republican nomination and used dissatisfaction with Governor Ben Cayetano's handling of the economy to propel her campaign. She polled above Cayetano. However, allegations that Lingle was a lesbian and her decision as mayor to require state employees to work on Christmas Eve hurt her. In the general election she lost by 5,254 votes. However, her gubernatorial campaign was the most successful since Randolph Crossley in 1966.

In 1999, Lingle and many of her supporters took over leadership positions in the party. Lingle defeated James Kuroiwa Jr., who was aligned with the party's conservative wing and was pro-life, to become chairwoman with 325 to 63 votes.

In the 2002 gubernatorial election, the Democratic party had a contentious primary where Mazie Hirono defeated Ed Case by 2,000 votes. Hirono's campaign was later hurt by corruption allegations that allowed Lingle to narrowly win the election, becoming the first Republican governor since 1962. She won reelection in 2006 and became the only multi-term popularly elected Republican governor in Hawaii history.

Leading into the 2004 presidential election, multiple polls showed George W. Bush performing well in Hawaii and the party made a push to win a House majority or at least enough to prevent veto overrides. However, the Bush campaign later decreased its efforts in Hawaii and Republicans instead lost five seats, despite Bush taking 45% of the votes, the closest the Republicans had come to winning the state in a presidential election since Ronald Reagan's victory in 1984.

In 2010, Representative Neil Abercrombie resigned to focus on his gubernatorial campaign. A special election was held to fill that vacancy. Because special elections did not have primaries, two Democrats candidates ended up splitting Democratic votes, allowing Charles Djou to win with a plurality of 40% to became the first Republican representative from Hawaii since Pat Saiki in 1991. He was defeated in the next general election by Colleen Hanabusa.

Following Donald Trump's election as president, many Republicans defected: Charles Djou became an independent and state House Minority Leader Beth Fukumoto became a Democrat. On December 11, 2019, the party cancelled its presidential preference poll and committed all of its primary delegates to Trump. In January 2021, party chair Shirlene Ostrov and vice-chair Edwin Boyette resigned after Boyette used the party's Twitter account to post a series of tweets praising the QAnon conspiracy theory and describing its adherents as patriots.

A notable recent convert to the party is Tulsi Gabbard, who previously served in the Hawaii House of Representatives from 2002 to 2004 and as U.S. representative for Hawaii's 2nd congressional district from 2013 to 2021 as a member of the Democratic Party. She left the party to become an independent in 2022, and joined the Republicans in 2024. She currently serves as the director of national intelligence (DNI) in the Second Trump Administration.

== Positions ==
=== Economics ===
Hawaiʻi Republicans advocate for limited government, lower taxes, decentralized control of public schools, and improving the state's business climate. Republicans generally support business plans and efforts to assist companies in the state in competing against businesses in other states. They typically support interstate and international commerce. For example, former Lieutenant Governor Duke Aiona pushed to keep the National Football League's Pro Bowl in Hawaii, and former Governor Linda Lingle proposed tax reduction incentives to businesses to encourage job creation, such as hotel renovations.

=== Environment ===
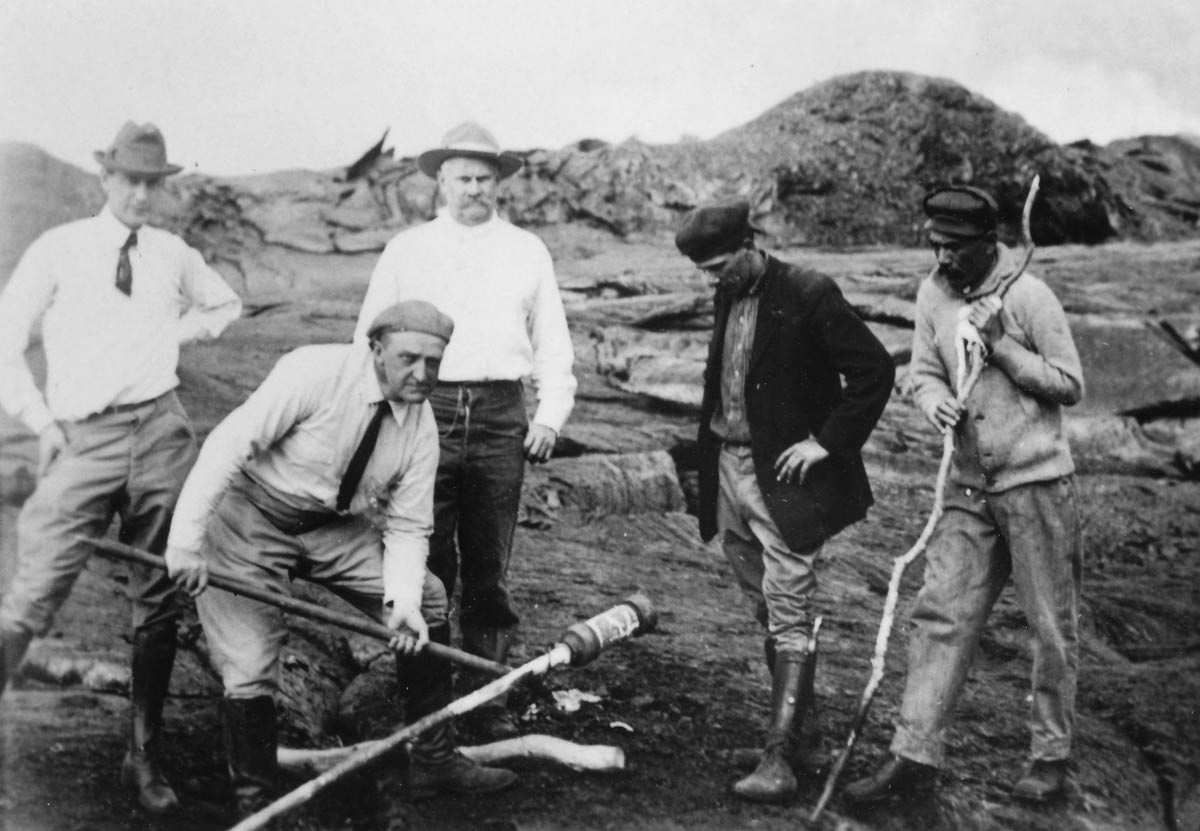
Measuring lava at Halema'uma'u, Kilauea, Hawaiian Volcano Observatory in 1917. Left to right, Norton Twigg-Smith, Thomas Jaggar, Lorrin Thurston, Joe Monez, and Alex Lancaster.

In the Reform Party, a pre-statehood group that after annexation was largely sympathetic toward the Republican Party, Lorrin Thurston was a strong supporter of the formation of Hawaii Volcanoes National Park. In the 21st century, Governor Lingle proposed a Clean Energy Initiative to promote renewable energy, with the goal of making the state 70% energy self-sustainable by 2030. The initiative planned to use solar, wind, ocean, geothermal, and biomass as energy resources with a phased reduction in fossil fuel use.

=== Religion ===
Despite the influence of the early missionaries and despite recent national trends, the Republican party in Hawaiʻi steadily lost its Christian overtone over time. After annexation, Christians proselytized immigrants contracted to work in Hawaii's growing sugar industry. This change was, in large part, brought on by Farrington v. Tokushige (1927), a U.S. Supreme Court case brought by approximately 100 Japanese, Korean, and Chinese language schools, a number of which were Buddhist religious schools, against Republican Governor Wallace R. Farrington and the Republican government. It sought to overturn laws limiting the material taught in private schools, including Buddhist philosophy. The court found the laws unconstitutional and in violation of parents' Fifth Amendment right to choose the education of their children. Duke Aiona, a Republican, presented a proclamation to the president of the Junior Young Buddhist Association in 2004 and attended the 2010 lantern festival.

The Party became hesitant to associate itself with religion, with members citing the negative effects of the party's association with the Christian Coalition. The Coalition swelled Republican membership by 50%, but gave rise to infighting; by 1993 the party had lost legislative seats.

== State chair and staff ==
Name	Position
Shirlene Ostrov	State Chair
N/A	Executive Director

=== Former state chairs ===
Chairs of the Hawaii Republican Party
Name	Term
John Carroll	1981–1983
Pat Saiki	1983–1986
Howard Chong	1986–1989
D. G. Anderson	1989–1991
Jared Jossem	1991–1994
Jane Tatibouet	1994–1997
Donna Alcantara	1997–1999
Linda Lingle	1999–2002
Micah Kāne	2002–2003
Brennon Morioka	2003–2004
Sam Aiona	2005–2007
Willes Lee	2007–2009
Jonah Kaʻauwai	2009–2011
Beth Fukumoto (Interim)	2011
David S. Chang	2011–2014
Pat Saiki	2014–2015
Fritz Rohlfing	2015–2017
Shirlene Ostrov	2017–2021
Boyd Ready (Interim)	2021
Lynn Finnegan	2021–2023
Diamond Garcia (Interim)	2023
Tamara McKay	2023–2025
Art Hannemann	2025
Shirlene Ostrov	2025–present

== County chairs ==
Name	County
N/A (resigned)	Honolulu County
Tammy Perkins (suspended)	Maui County
Daelene McCormick	West Hawaii County
Mark Jones	East Hawaii County
Ana Mo Des	Kauai County

== Elected officials ==
=== Congress ===
- Hiram Fong, United States Senator (1959–1977)
- Charles Djou, United States Representative from Hawaii's 1st district (2010–2011)
- Pat Saiki, United States Representative from Hawaii's 1st district (1987–1991)
- Mary Elizabeth Pruett Farrington, Delegate to the United States House from Hawaii Territory's at-large district (1954–1957)
- Joseph Rider Farrington, Delegate to the United States House from Hawaii Territory's at-large district (1943–1954)
- Samuel Wilder King, Delegate to the United States House from Hawaii Territory's at-large district (1935–1943)
- Victor S. K. Houston, Delegate to the United States House from Hawaii Territory's at-large district (1927–1933)
- Henry Alexander Baldwin, Delegate to the United States House from Hawaii Territory's at-large district (1922–1923)
- Jonah Kūhiō Kalanianaʻole, Delegate to the United States House from Hawaii Territory's at-large district (1903–1922)

=== State and territorial officials ===
- Linda Lingle, Governor (2002–2010)
- Duke Aiona, Lieutenant Governor (2002–2010)
- William F. Quinn, Governor (1957–1962)
- James Kealoha, Lieutenant Governor (1959–1962)
- Samuel Wilder King, Territorial Governor (1953–1957)
- Duke Kahanamoku, Sheriff of Honolulu (1932–1961)
- Lawrence M. Judd, Territorial Governor (1929–1934)
- Wallace Rider Farrington, Territorial Governor (1921–1929)
- Walter F. Frear, Territorial Governor (1907–1913)
- George R. Carter, Territorial Governor (1903–1907)
- Sanford B. Dole, Territorial Governor (1900–1903)

=== State legislative leaders ===
- Senate Minority Leader: Samantha DeCorte
- House Minority Leader: Lauren Matsumoto
- House Minority Floor Leader: Diamond Garcia

== Electoral performance ==
=== Presidential ===
Hawaii Republican Party presidential election results
Election	Presidential ticket	Votes	Vote %	Electoral votes	Result
1960	Richard Nixon/Henry Cabot Lodge Jr.	92,295	49.97%	0 / 3	Lost
1964	Barry Goldwater/William E. Miller	44,022	21.24%	0 / 4	Lost
1968	Richard Nixon/Spiro Agnew	91,425	38.70%	0 / 4	Lost
1972	Richard Nixon/Spiro Agnew	168,865	62.48%	4 / 4	Won
1976	Gerald Ford/Bob Dole	140,003	48.06%	0 / 4	Lost
1980	Ronald Reagan/George H. W. Bush	130,112	42.90%	0 / 4	Lost
1984	Ronald Reagan/George H. W. Bush	185,050	55.10%	4 / 4	Won
1988	George H. W. Bush/Dan Quayle	158,625	44.75%	0 / 4	Lost
1992	George H. W. Bush/Dan Quayle	136,822	36.70%	0 / 4	Lost
1996	Bob Dole/Jack Kemp	113,943	31.64%	0 / 4	Lost
2000	George W. Bush/Dick Cheney	137,845	37.46%	0 / 4	Lost
2004	George W. Bush/Dick Cheney	194,191	45.26%	0 / 4	Lost
2008	John McCain/Sarah Palin	120,566	26.58%	0 / 4	Lost
2012	Mitt Romney/Paul Ryan	121,015	27.84%	0 / 4	Lost
2016	Donald Trump/Mike Pence	128,847	30.36%	0 / 4	Lost
2020	Donald Trump/Mike Pence	196,864	34.27%	0 / 4	Lost
2024	Donald Trump/JD Vance	193,661	37.48%	0 / 4	Lost

=== Gubernatorial ===
Hawaii Republican Party gubernatorial election results
Election	Gubernatorial ticket	Votes	Vote %	Result
1959	William F. Quinn/James Kealoha	86,213	51.12%	Won ✓
1962	William F. Quinn/Calvin McGregor	81,707	41.68%	Lost ✗
1966	Randolph Crossley/George H. Mills	104,324	48.94%	Lost ✗
1970	Samuel King/Ralph Kiyosaki	101,249	42.35%	Lost ✗
1974	Randolph Crossley/Benjamin F. Dillingham II	113,388	45.42%	Lost ✗
1978	John R. Leopold/Virginia Isbell	124,610	44.25%	Lost ✗
1982	D. G. Anderson/Pat Saiki	81,507	26.14%	Lost ✗
1986	D. G. Anderson/John Henry Felix	160,460	48.02%	Lost ✗
1990	Fred Hemmings/Billie Beamer	131,310	38.61%	Lost ✗
1994	Pat Saiki/Fred Hemmings	107,908	29.24%	Lost ✗
1998	Linda Lingle/Stan Koki	198,952	48.82%	Lost ✗
2002	Linda Lingle/Duke Aiona	197,009	51.56%	Won ✓
2006	Linda Lingle/Duke Aiona	215,313	62.53%	Won ✓
2010	Duke Aiona/Lynn Finnegan	157,311	41.12%	Lost ✗
2014	Duke Aiona/Elwin Ahu	135,775	37.08%	Lost ✗
2018	Andria Tupola/Marissa Kerns	131,719	33.70%	Lost ✗
2022	Duke Aiona/Seaula Tupa'i Jr.	152,237	36.84%	Lost ✗
2026	Gary Cordery/Daniel Anthony	105,258	27.36%	Lost ✗

=== Congressional ===
Electoral performance

United States Senate
Election year	Vote percentage	+/–	Votes	No. of overall seats won	+/–
1959	48.28 / 100	Steady	79,123	1 / 2	Steady
1959	52.89 / 100	Steady	87,161	1 / 2	Steady
1962	30.59 / 100	▼17.69%	60,067	1 / 2	Steady
1964	53.04 / 100	▲0.15%	110,747	1 / 2	Steady
1968	14.99 / 100	▼15.60%	34,008	1 / 2	Steady
1970	51.57 / 100	▼1.47%	124,163	1 / 2	Steady
1974	0.00 / 100	▼14.99%	0	1 / 2	Steady
1976	40.63 / 100	▼10.94%	122,724	0 / 2	▼1
1980	18.43 / 100	▲18.43%	53,068	0 / 2	Steady
1982	16.99 / 100	▼23.64%	52,071	0 / 2	Steady
1986	26.43 / 100	▲8.00%	86,910	0 / 2	Steady
1988	20.68 / 100	▲3.69%	66,987	0 / 2	Steady
1990 (special)	44.35 / 100	▲23.67%	155,978	0 / 2	Steady
1992	26.93 / 100	▲0.50%	97,928	0 / 2	Steady
1994	24.19 / 100	▼20.16%	86,320	0 / 2	Steady
1998	17.83 / 100	▼9.10%	70,964	0 / 2	Steady
2000	24.51 / 100	▲0.32%	84,701	0 / 2	Steady
2004	20.99 / 100	▲3.17%	87,172	0 / 2	Steady
2006	36.78 / 100	▲12.27%	126,097	0 / 2	Steady
2010	21.57 / 100	▲0.58%	79,939	0 / 2	Steady
2012	37.40 / 100	▲0.62%	160,994	0 / 2	Steady
2014 (special)	27.70 / 100	▲6.13%	98,006	0 / 2	Steady
2016	22.24 / 100	▼5.46%	92,653	0 / 2	Steady
2018	28.85 / 100	▼8.55%	112,035	0 / 2	Steady
2022	26.0 / 100	▲3.76%	105,704	0 / 2	Steady

United States House of Representatives
Election year	Vote percentage	+/–	Votes	No. of overall seats won	+/–
1959	31.37 / 100	Steady	51,058	0 / 1	Steady
1960	25.63 / 100	▼5.74%	46,812	0 / 1	Steady
1962	32.15 / 100	▲6.52%	117,172	0 / 2	Steady
1964	37.07 / 100	▲4.92%	145,572	0 / 2	Steady
1966	31.59 / 100	▼5.48%	129,754	0 / 2	Steady
1968	27.21 / 100	▼4.38%	117,966	0 / 2	Steady
1970	15.26 / 100	▼11.95%	31,764	0 / 2	Steady
1972	44.09 / 100	▲28.83%	121,181	0 / 2	Steady
1974	38.94 / 100	▼5.15%	101,049	0 / 2	Steady
1976	26.44 / 100	▼12.50%	77,662	0 / 2	Steady
1978	15.85 / 100	▼10.59%	40,167	0 / 2	Steady
1980	7.06 / 100	▼8.79%	19,819	0 / 2	Steady
1982	0.00 / 100	▼7.06%	0	0 / 2	Steady
1984	14.73 / 100	▲14.73%	40,608	0 / 2	Steady
1986	40.78 / 100	▲26.05%	135,054	1 / 2	▲1
1988	28.50 / 100	▼12.28%	96,848	1 / 2	Steady
1990	34.49 / 100	▲5.99%	117,607	0 / 2	▼1
1992	22.78 / 100	▼11.71%	81,645	0 / 2	Steady
1994	33.75 / 100	▲10.97%	119,514	0 / 2	Steady
1996	38.45 / 100	▲4.70%	135,782	0 / 2	Steady
1998	30.02 / 100	▼8.43%	119,328	0 / 2	Steady
2000	32.58 / 100	▲2.56%	110,895	0 / 2	Steady
2002	32.42 / 100	▼0.16%	116,693	0 / 2	Steady
2004	35.64 / 100	▲3.22%	148,443	0 / 2	Steady
2006	34.96 / 100	▼0.68%	118,134	0 / 2	Steady
2008	19.75 / 100	▼15.21%	82,540	0 / 2	Steady
2010	35.86 / 100	▲16.11%	129,127	0 / 2	▼1
2012	32.55 / 100	▼3.31%	137,531	0 / 2	Steady
2014	33.34 / 100	▲0.79%	120,084	0 / 2	Steady
2016	20.74 / 100	▼12.60%	85,626	0 / 2	Steady
2018	22.85 / 100	▲2.11%	87,348	0 / 2	Steady
2020	29.48 / 100	▲6.63%	155,215	0 / 2	Steady
2022	30.89 / 100	▲1.41%	123,288	0 / 2	Steady

=== State legislature ===
Electoral performance

Senate
Election year	No. of overall seats won	+/–	Governor
1960	14 / 25	Steady	William F. Quinn
1962	10 / 25	▼4	William F. Quinn
1964	9 / 25	▼1	John A. Burns
1966	10 / 25	▲1	John A. Burns
1968	10 / 25	Steady	John A. Burns
1970	8 / 25	▼2	John A. Burns
1972	8 / 25	Steady	John A. Burns
1974	8 / 25	Steady	John A. Burns
1976	8 / 25	Steady	George Ariyoshi
1978	7 / 25	▼1	George Ariyoshi
1980	8 / 25	▲1	George Ariyoshi
1982	8 / 25	Steady	George Ariyoshi
1984	3 / 25	▼5	George Ariyoshi
1986	5 / 25	▲2	George Ariyoshi
1988	3 / 25	▼3	John D. Waiheʻe III
1990	3 / 25	Steady	John D. Waiheʻe III
1992	3 / 25	Steady	John D. Waiheʻe III
1994	2 / 25	▼1	John D. Waiheʻe III
1996	2 / 25	Steady	Ben Cayetano
1998	2 / 25	Steady	Ben Cayetano
2000	3 / 25	▲1	Ben Cayetano
2002	5 / 25	▲2	Ben Cayetano
2004	5 / 25	Steady	Linda Lingle
2006	5 / 25	Steady	Linda Lingle
2008	2 / 25	▼3	Linda Lingle
2010	1 / 25	▼1	Linda Lingle
2012	1 / 25	Steady	Neil Abercrombie
2014	1 / 25	Steady	Neil Abercrombie
2016	0 / 25	▼1	David Ige
2018	1 / 25	▲1	David Ige
2020	1 / 25	Steady	David Ige
2022	2 / 25	▲1	David Ige
2024	3 / 25	▲1	Josh Green

House of Representatives
Election year	No. of overall seats won	+/–	Governor
1960	18 / 51	Steady	William F. Quinn
1962	11 / 51	▼7	William F. Quinn
1964	12 / 51	▲1	John A. Burns
1966	12 / 51	Steady	John A. Burns
1968	13 / 51	▲1	John A. Burns
1970	17 / 51	▲4	John A. Burns
1972	16 / 51	▼1	John A. Burns
1974	17 / 51	▲1	John A. Burns
1976	10 / 51	▼7	George Ariyoshi
1978	9 / 51	▼1	George Ariyoshi
1980	12 / 51	▲3	George Ariyoshi
1982	8 / 51	▼4	George Ariyoshi
1984	11 / 51	▲3	George Ariyoshi
1986	11 / 51	Steady	George Ariyoshi
1988	6 / 51	▼5	John D. Waiheʻe III
1990	6 / 51	Steady	John D. Waiheʻe III
1992	4 / 51	▼2	John D. Waiheʻe III
1994	7 / 51	▲3	John D. Waiheʻe III
1996	12 / 51	▲5	Ben Cayetano
1998	12 / 51	Steady	Ben Cayetano
2000	19 / 51	▲7	Ben Cayetano
2002	15 / 51	▼4	Ben Cayetano
2004	10 / 51	▼5	Linda Lingle
2006	8 / 51	▼2	Linda Lingle
2008	6 / 51	▼2	Linda Lingle
2010	8 / 51	▲2	Linda Lingle
2012	7 / 51	▼1	Neil Abercrombie
2014	7 / 51	Steady	Neil Abercrombie
2016	5 / 51	▼2	David Ige
2018	5 / 51	Steady	David Ige
2020	4 / 51	▼1	David Ige
2022	6 / 51	▲2	David Ige
2024	9 / 51	▲3	Josh Green

== See also ==
- Aloha ʻĀina Party of Hawai'i
- Green Party of Hawaii
- Democratic Party of Hawaii

== Bibliography ==
- Andrade Jr., Ernest (1996). Unconquerable Rebel: Robert W. Wilcox and Hawaiian Politics, 1880–1903. University Press of Colorado. ISBN 0-87081-417-6.
- Chapin, Helen Geracimos (1996). Shaping history: the role of newspapers in Hawai'i. Shaping history: the role of newspapers in Hawai'i.
- Kame'eleihiwa, Lilikala (1995). A synopsis of Traditional Hawaiian Culture, the Events Leading to the 1887 Bayonet Constitution and the Overthrow of the Hawaiian Government. (unpublished).
- Laenui, Poka (1984). East Wind, Vol. III, No. 1. East Wind, Vol. III, No. 1.
- Liliuokalani (1898). Hawaii's Story. Tothrop, Lee & Shepard Co.
