= Diamond Garcia =

American politician from Hawaii

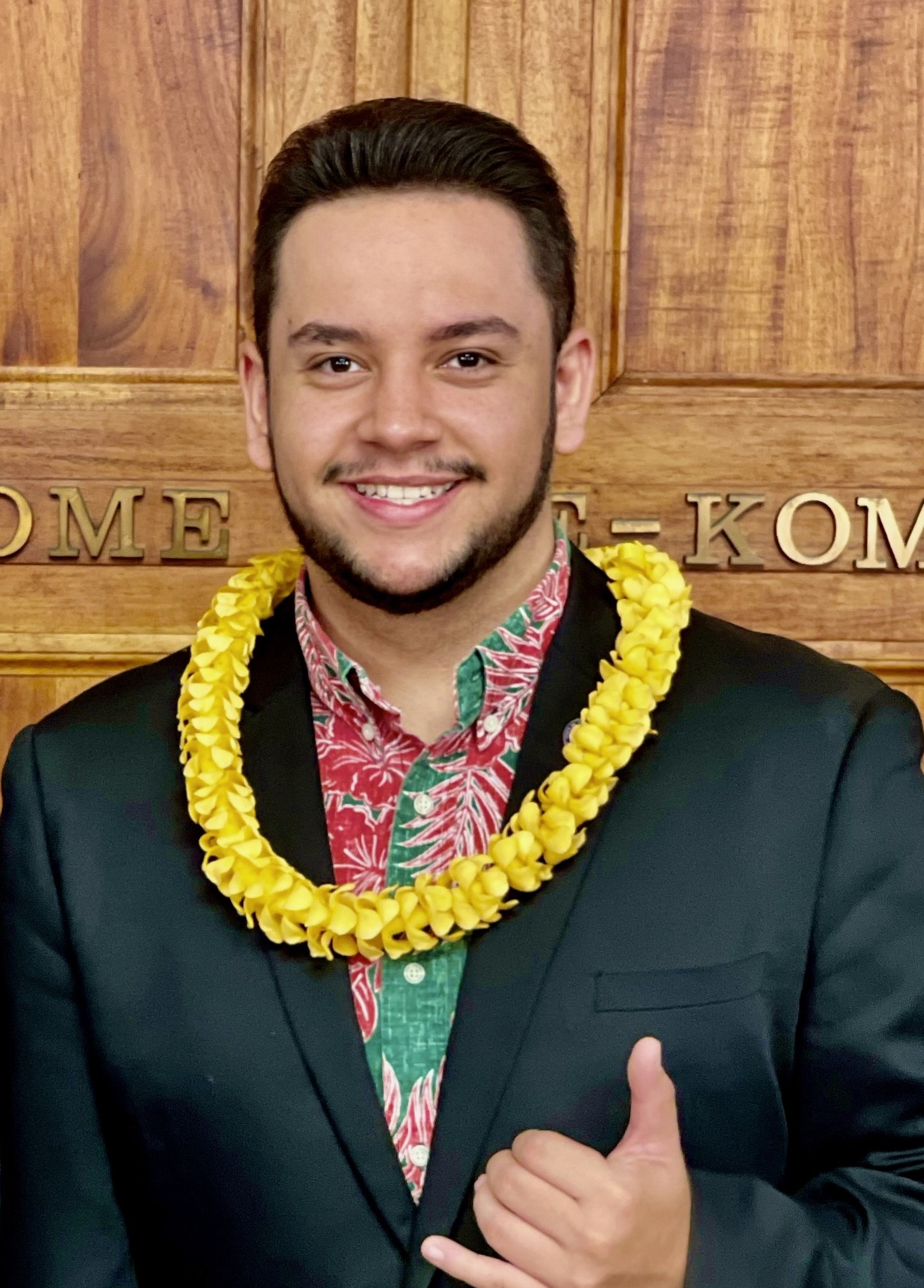

Chair of the Hawaii Republican Party
- In office January 31, 2023 – May 6, 2023
- Preceded by: Lynn Finnegan
- Succeeded by: Tamara McKay

Member of the Hawaii House of Representatives from the 42nd district
- Incumbent
- Assumed office November 8, 2022
- Preceded by: Sharon Har

Personal details
- Born: November 3, 1997 (age 28) Honolulu, Hawaii, U.S.
- Party: Republican
- Website: Official website

Diamond Dean Garcia (/ɡɑːrsjɑː/ GAR-syah; born November 3, 1997) is an American politician. He currently serves in the Hawaii House of Representatives, representing District 42 which encompasses, Ewa and Kapolei since 2022. Since January 31, 2023, Garcia is among the youngest state legislators in the United States.

== Early life and education ==
Garcia was born November 3, 1997, in Honolulu. He was raised on the West-side of O'ahu. Garcia is an active member of the Seventh-day Adventist Church. He attended Hawaiian Mission Academy from 2011 to 2015.

== Career ==
Garcia has worked in various roles before becoming a state legislator. In 2014, he was the National Account Director for Remnant Publications, a Christian book publisher, in Coldwater, Michigan. Between 2015 and 2017, Garcia was a missionary for the Seventh Day Adventist Church.

== Politics ==
In 2018, Garcia became chief of staff in the Office of the Minority Leader Emeritus Gene Ward. Since November 8, 2022, he serves as a state representative and also as minority floor leader in the Hawaii House of Representatives. Between 2021 and 2022, Garcia held the position of vice-chairman of the Hawaii Republican Party before becoming chairman on January 31, 2023, after Lynn Finnegan resigned from the role.

Party political offices
Preceded by Lynn Finnegan	Chair of the Hawaii Republican Party; 2023	Succeeded by Tamara McKay
