= 2010 Hawaii gubernatorial election =

- November 2, 2010
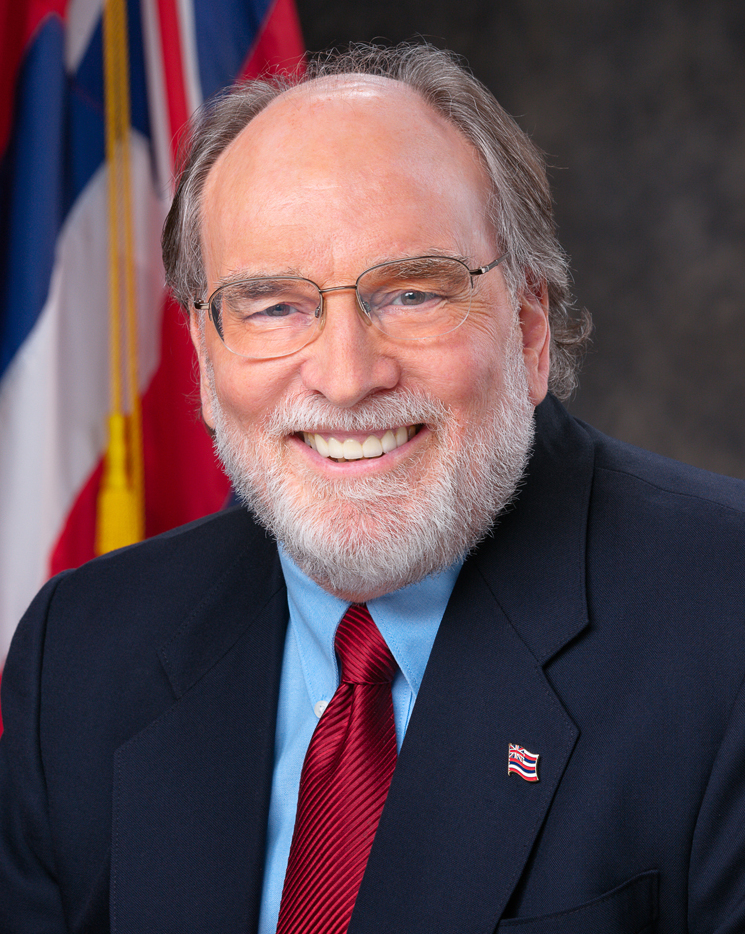

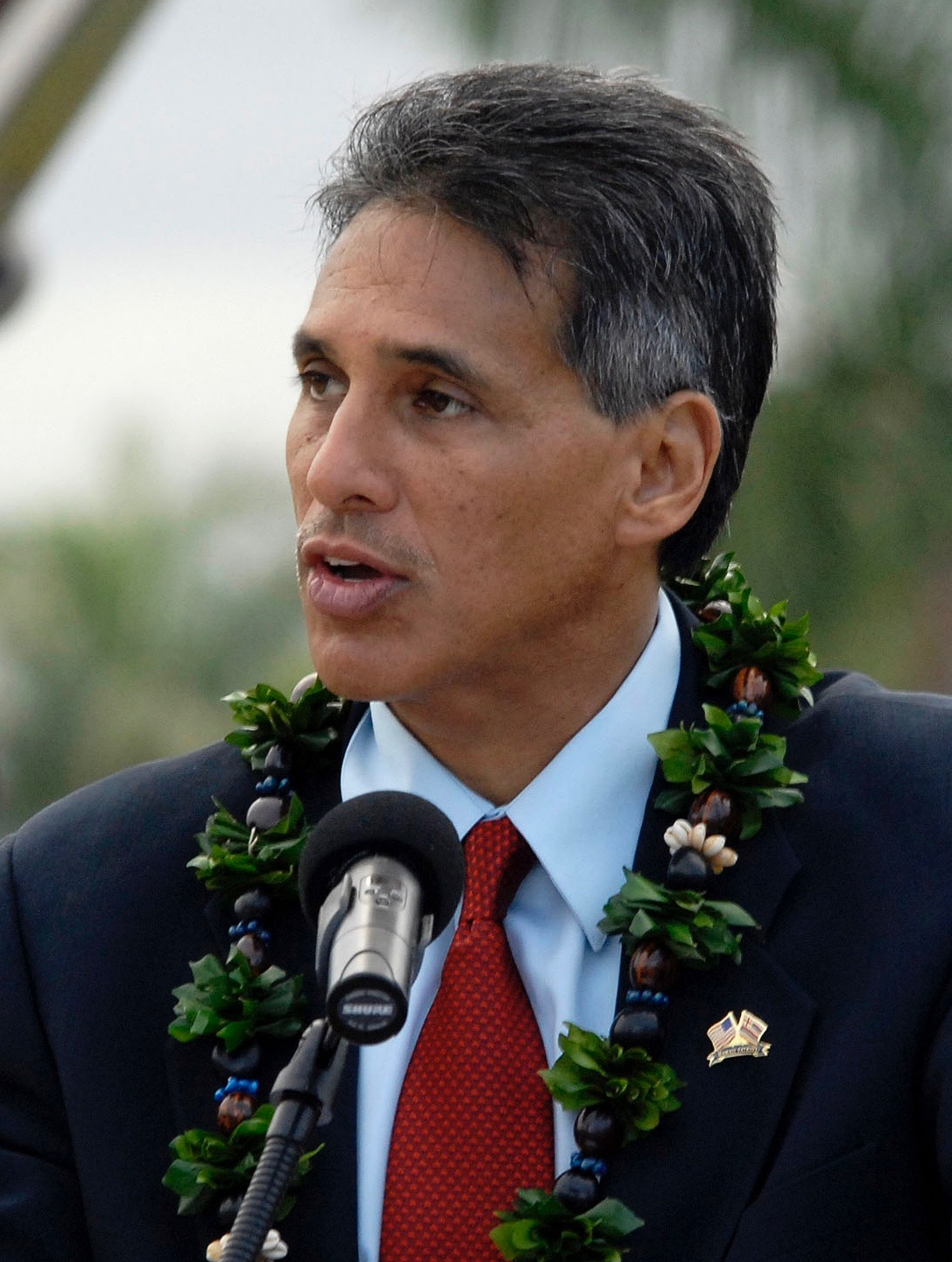
Nominee	Neil Abercrombie	Duke Aiona
Party	Democratic	Republican
Running mate	Brian Schatz	Lynn Finnegan
Popular vote	222,724	157,311
Percentage	58.22%	41.12%
- County results Abercrombie: 50–60% 60–70%
Governor before election
Linda Lingle
Republican
Elected Governor
Neil Abercrombie
Democratic

The 2010 Hawaii gubernatorial election was held on November 2, 2010, to elect the next governor and lieutenant governor of Hawaii. Incumbent Republican governor Linda Lingle was term-limited and not eligible to run for re-election. The Democratic Party nominated Neil Abercrombie, and the Republican Party nominated incumbent lieutenant governor Duke Aiona. In the election, Abercrombie won and was sworn in as the state's 7th governor on December 6, 2010. Aiona later unsuccessfully ran for Governor of Hawaii in 2014 and 2022.

As of 2024, this was the last time the Republican candidate for governor received over 40% of the vote in Hawaii. This marked the first time since 1966 that both the governor and lieutenant governor of Hawaii were white and the first time both were born outside of Hawaii.

== Democratic primary ==
=== Gubernatorial ===
- Neil Abercrombie, former U.S. representative and candidate for U.S. Senate in 1970
- Mufi Hannemann, former Mayor of Honolulu, nominee for HI-01 in 1986, and candidate in 1990
- Arturo P. (Art) Reyes
- Miles Shiratori
- Van K. Tanabe

Results by county: Map legend: Abercrombie—60–70%; Abercrombie—50–60%; Hannemann—40–50%

Democratic primary results
Party	Candidate	Votes	%
Democratic	Neil Abercrombie	142,234	59.3
Democratic	Mufi Hannemann	90,535	37.7
Democratic	Arturo P. Reyes	1,350	0.6
Democratic	Van K. Tanabe	1,329	0.6
Democratic	Miles Shiratori	1,031	0.4
Total votes		236,479	100

==== Polling ====
Poll source	Dates administered	Neil Abercrombie	Mufi Hannemann	Undecided
Honolulu Star-Advertiser	August 10–17, 2010	49%	44%	8%
Mason Dixon	January 8–12, 2010	37%	34%	29%
Research 2000	June 15–17, 2009	42%	22%	36%

=== Lieutenant governor primary ===
Eleven candidates ran for their political parties' nominations in the lieutenant governor primary election on September 18: seven Democrats, two Republicans, one independent, and one Free Energy Party candidate.

==== Candidates ====
- Lyla Berg, 59, Hawaiian state representative first elected in 2004 to represent the Kāhala area; former teacher and principal
- Robert Bunda, 63, state legislator since 1983: state representative from 1983 until 1994 and senator from 1994 until 2010; president of the Hawaii Senate for five years. Resigned from office to run for lieutenant governor.
- Steve Hirakami, 64, principal of a charter school in Pahoa, on the Big Island of Hawai'i
- Gary Hooser, 56, former state senator from Kauaʻi. Campaign based largely on support of civil unions.
- Jon Riki Karamatsu, 35, state legislator first elected in 2002 to represent the Waipahu area; chairman of the state House Judiciary Committee
- Norman Sakamoto, 63, sitting state senator first elected in 1996 to represent the Kalihi, Salt Lake, and Pearl Ridge neighborhoods of Honolulu; chairman of the state Senate Education and Housing Committee; opponent of civil unions
- Brian Schatz, 37, former state legislator and former chairman of the Hawaiian Democratic Party. Resident of Honolulu.

Results by county: Map legend: Schatz—30–40%; Hooser—40–50%

Democratic primary results
Party	Candidate	Votes	%
Democratic	Brian Schatz	83,431	34.8
Democratic	Robert Bunda	45,973	19.2
Democratic	Norman Sakamoto	44,462	18.5
Democratic	Gary Hooser	22,878	9.5
Democratic	Lyla Berg	20,161	8.4
Democratic	Jon Riki Karamatsu	6,746	2.8
Democratic	Steve Hirakami	2,695	1.1
Total votes		226,346	100

== Republican primary ==
- Duke Aiona, Lieutenant Governor of Hawaii
- John Carroll, former state senator and representative

Results by county: Map legend: Aiona—>90%

Republican primary results
Party	Candidate	Votes	%
Republican	Duke Aiona	42,479	93.0
Republican	John S. Carroll	2,075	4.5
Total votes		44,554	100

=== Lieutenant governor ===
- Lynn Finnegan, 39, state legislator since 2002; Republican leader in the State House since 2005. Resident of Aiea, Hawaii.
- Adrienne King, 62, lawyer for more than thirty years. Resident of Honolulu, daughter-in-law to judge Samuel Pailthorpe King.

Republican primary results
Party	Candidate	Votes	%
Republican	Lynn Finnegan	27,052	59.2
Republican	Adrienne King	12,300	26.9
Total votes		39,352	100

== Non-partisan primary ==
- Tony Clapes
- Paul Manner
- Thomas (Tom) W. Pollard, critical care Doctor of Osteopathic Medicine

Non-partisan primary results
Party	Candidate	Votes	%
Independent	Tom Pollard	265	20.3
Independent	Paul Manner	188	14.4
Independent	Tony Clapes	95	7.3
Total votes		548	100

== Free Energy Party primary ==
- Daniel H. Cunningham

=== Lieutenant governor ===
- Deborah Spence, no age provided, campaigns for the revival of hemp, which she calls the "most utilitarian plant", for use as a cellulose and biofuel. Resident of Hilo.

== Independent ==
- Leonard Kama, 67, retired security guard and deckhand campaigning on education and a reduction of homelessness. Resident of Kapolei.

== General election ==
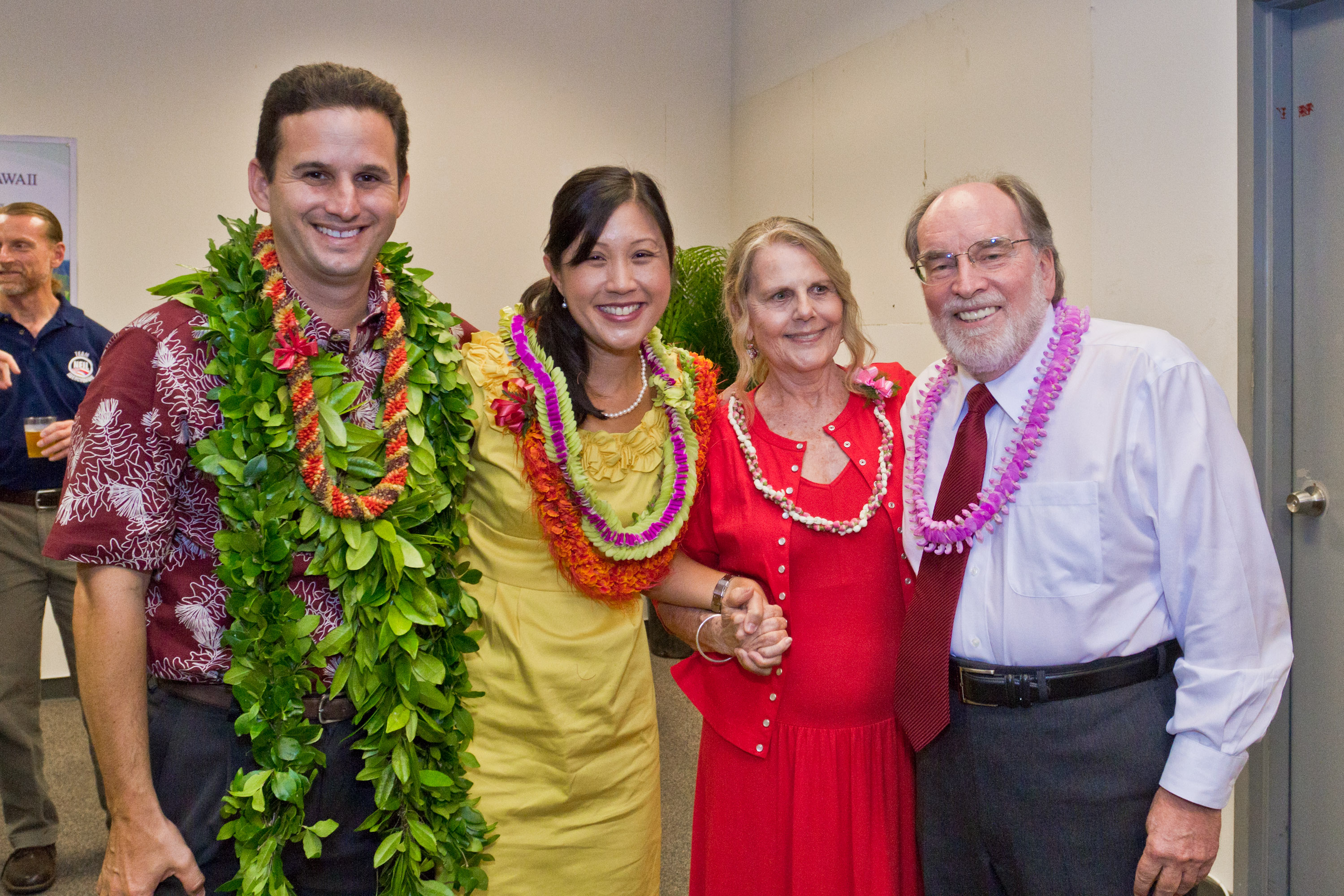
Neil Abercrombie and his running mate Brian Schatz on the day of the election

=== Predictions ===
Source	Ranking	As of
Cook Political Report	Lean D (flip)	October 14, 2010
Rothenberg	Tilt D (flip)	October 28, 2010
RealClearPolitics	Tossup	November 1, 2010
Sabato's Crystal Ball	Lean D (flip)	October 28, 2010
CQ Politics	Likely D (flip)	October 28, 2010

=== Polling ===
Poll source	Dates administered	Neil Abercrombie (D)	Duke Aiona (R)
Public Policy Polling	October 2–3, 2010	49%	47%
Honolulu Star-Advertiser	August 10–17, 2010	53%	41%
Rasmussen Reports	June 24, 2010	58%	32%
Rasmussen Reports	March 24, 2010	54%	31%
Mason Dixon	January 8–12, 2010	43%	34%
Research 2000	June 15–17, 2009	45%	36%

=== Candidates ===
- Neil Abercrombie (D)
  - Abercrombie's running mate was former state Democratic Party chairman Brian Schatz
- Duke Aiona (R)
  - Aiona's running mate was State Rep. Lynn Finnegan
- Daniel Cunningham (FE)
  - Cunningham's running mate was Deborah Spence
- Tom Pollard (I)
  - Pollard's running mate was Leonard Kama

=== Results ===
2010 Hawaii gubernatorial election
Party	Candidate	Votes	%	±%
Democratic	Neil Abercrombie	222,724	58.22%	+22.87
Republican	Duke Aiona	157,311	41.12%	−21.41
Free Energy Party	Daniel Cunningham	1,265	0.33%	N/A
Independent politician	Tom Pollard	1,263	0.33%	N/A
Turnout		382,563		
Democratic gain from Republican				

==== By county ====
County	Neil Abercrombie Democratic		Duke Aiona Republican		All Others	
County	#	%	#	%	#	%
Hawaii	33,095	61.99%	19,807	37.1%	484	0.9%
Honolulu	150,554	56.9%	112,527	42.53%	1,492	0.57%
Kauaʻi	13,559	59.82%	8,953	39.5%	156	0.69%
Maui	25,516	60.85%	16,024	38.21%	396	0.94%
Totals	222,724	58.22%	157,311	41.12%	2,528	0.66%

Counties that flipped from Republican to Democratic

- All 5

== See also ==
- 2010 United States gubernatorial elections
