= Neil Abercrombie =

American politician (born 1938)

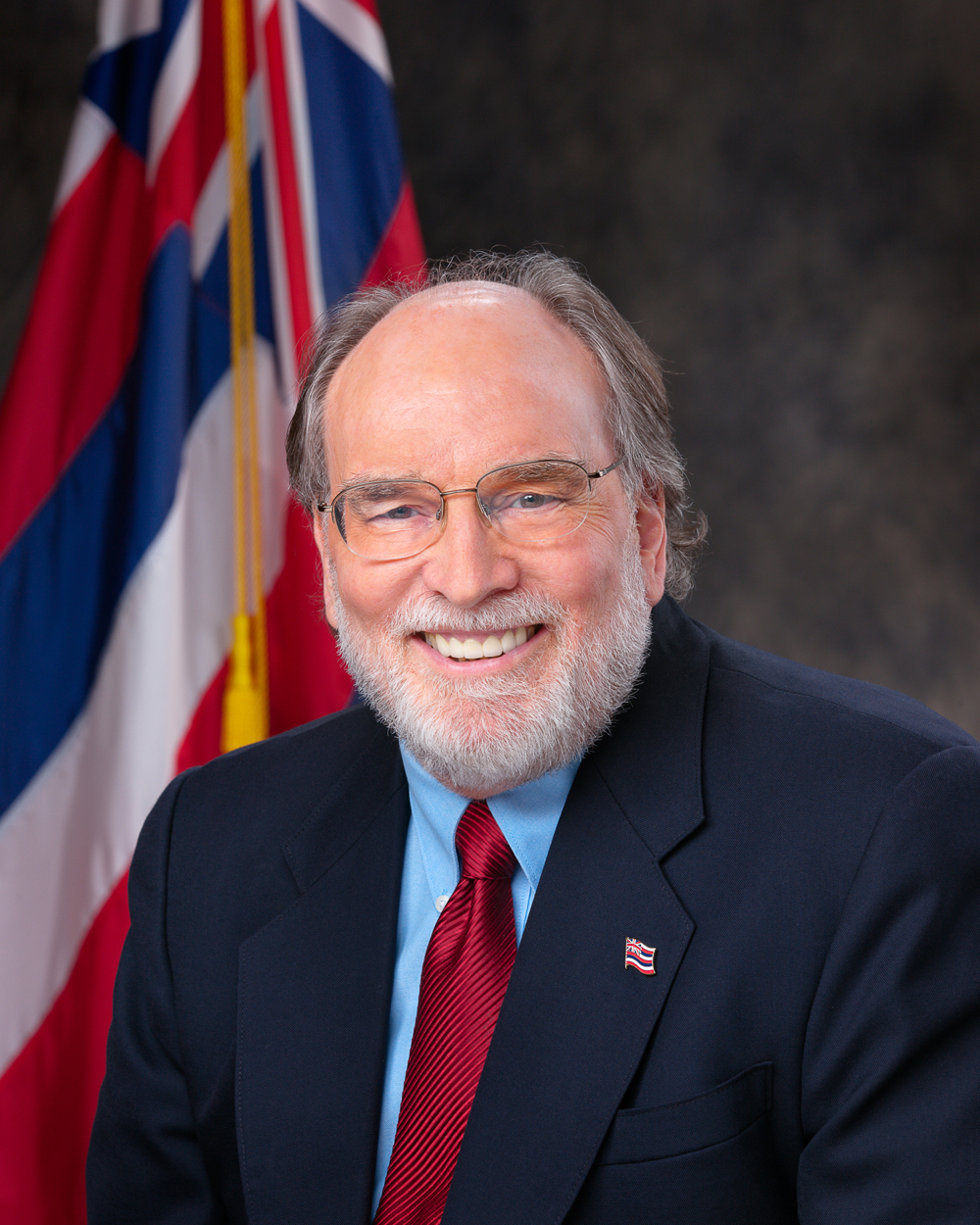
- Official portrait, 2011

7th Governor of Hawaii
- In office December 6, 2010 – December 1, 2014
- Lieutenant: Brian Schatz; Shan Tsutsui
- Preceded by: Linda Lingle
- Succeeded by: David Ige

Member of the U.S. House of Representatives from Hawaii's 1st district
- In office January 3, 1991 – February 28, 2010
- Preceded by: Pat Saiki
- Succeeded by: Charles Djou
- In office September 20, 1986 – January 3, 1987 (Note: Abercrombie's official service began on the date of the special election, while he was not sworn in until September 23, 1986.)
- Preceded by: Cecil Heftel
- Succeeded by: Pat Saiki

Personal details
- Born: June 26, 1938 (age 88) Buffalo, New York, U.S.
- Party: Democratic
- Spouse: Nancie Caraway (m. 1981)
- Education: Union College (BA); University of Hawaii, Manoa (MA, PhD)

Neil Abercrombie (born June 26, 1938) is an American politician who served as the seventh governor of Hawaii from 2010 to 2014. He is a member of the Democratic Party.

Born in Buffalo, New York, Abercrombie is a graduate of Union College and the University of Hawaiʻi at Mānoa. He began his political career in 1975, winning a seat in the Hawai'i House of Representatives. He served in the Hawai'i House until 1979, when he was elected to the Hawai'i State Senate. Upon the resignation of Cecil Heftel, who resigned from the U.S. House of Representatives to run for governor, Abercrombie was elected to his vacant seat in a special election in 1986, but lost the Democratic primary for a full term on the same day. Abercrombie served the remainder of Heftel's term until January 1987. He served on the Honolulu City Council from 1988 to 1990 before returning to Congress in 1991. Abercrombie served nine consecutive terms in the House from 1993 to 2010, representing Hawai'i's 1st congressional district, consisting of urban Honolulu.

With incumbent Governor Linda Lingle prevented from running for reelection due to term limits, Abercrombie declared his candidacy for governor in March 2009. In September 2010 he won the five-candidate Democratic primary with 59% of the vote. Abercrombie went on to face Republican nominee, Lieutenant Governor Duke Aiona, in the general election. On November 2, 2010, Abercrombie and running mate Brian Schatz defeated Aiona with 57% of the vote. Abercrombie was sworn into office on December 6, 2010. In 2014, he was defeated in the Democratic primary by state senator David Ige, who went on to win the general election.

== Early life and education ==
Abercrombie was born on June 26, 1938, in Buffalo, New York, the son of Vera June (née Grader) and George Donald Abercrombie. He has English, Irish and German ancestors. His paternal great-grandfather James Abercrombie left Ireland for Canada; his son then immigrated to the United States. After graduating from Williamsville High School (now Williamsville South High School), Abercrombie pursued studies in sociology at Union College in Schenectady, New York, where he earned his bachelor's degree in 1959 and was a member of the Phi Delta Theta fraternity. He arrived in Honolulu in September 1959 to study at the University of Hawaiʻi at Mānoa, where he earned a master's degree in sociology and later a doctorate in American Studies. At the university he befriended and attended classes with President Barack Obama's parents, Ann Dunham and Barack Obama Sr.

To support himself as a graduate student, Abercrombie worked as a waiter at Chuck's Steak House in Waikīkī, a locker desk clerk at the Central YMCA, a custodian at Mother Rice Preschool, a construction apprentice program director, an elementary school teacher, and a college lecturer.

== Political career ==
Abercrombie first participated in a political campaign in 1970, seeking the Democratic nomination for U.S. Senate. Unsuccessful, Abercrombie ran for the Hawai'i State House of Representatives, where he served from 1975 to 1979. A distinguishing symbol of his early campaigns was a yellow Checker Taxi with his name and face painted on the side, the use of which was motivated by lack of money for traditional campaigning methods. The taxi became a symbol of both his standing as an outsider from the mainland and his unconventional style. In 1979, Abercrombie was elected to the Hawai'i State Senate, where he served from 1980 to 1986. After U.S. Representative Cecil Heftel resigned in July 1986 to run for governor of Hawai'i, Abercrombie was elected to the House in a September 1986 special election to complete Heftel's unexpired term. On the same day, he lost the Democratic primary for a full two-year term to Mufi Hannemann, who lost to Republican Pat Saiki in the general election.

Abercrombie then set his sights on a seat of the Honolulu City Council. He won the race and served from 1988 to 1990.

=== U.S. Congress ===
At the end of his council tenure in 1990, Abercrombie once again ran for Congress and won. He was reelected ten times. In the 2008 election, he won with 70.6% of the vote.

Abercrombie was a member of the Congressional Progressive Caucus and compiled a generally liberal voting record. He supported and voted for the 2001 No Child Left Behind Act. On October 10, 2002, he was among the 133 members of the House who voted against authorizing the 2003 invasion of Iraq. He cosponsored H.R. 1312 (Assault Weapons Ban and Law Enforcement Protection Act of 2005) on July 28, 2005. He took issue with the Vatican over not listing torture as a sin.

According to Project Vote Smart, Abercrombie holds the following issue positions: he is pro-choice, has voted against a ban on partial birth abortion, and has voted with the interests of NARAL and Planned Parenthood 100% of the time between 2000 and 2006. He has voted for bills designed to make it easier for Americans to vote, such as the motor voter bill. He has advocated strongly for civil liberties; his voting record is supported by both the American Civil Liberties Union (ACLU) and American Library Association. He was one of the 67 representatives to vote against the Defense of Marriage Act (DOMA) in 1996 and has also voted against a constitutional amendment proposed in 2006 to limit marriage to being between one man and one woman. He was one of only nine representatives not to cast a vote for or against the USA PATRIOT Act in 2001. In 2005 he voted against the extension of the act, calling it "a blank check to trample civil liberties." In 2007 he signed on as a co-sponsor of H.R. 676, which would have established a national health insurance program. He resigned from Congress on February 28, 2010, to concentrate on his campaign for governor.

Abercrombie served as chairman of the Armed Forces Subcommittee on Air and Land Forces and a senior member of the Natural Resources Committee. He co-authored landmark legislation creating public-private partnerships between the military and private developers to build, maintain and manage housing for military families.

=== 2010 gubernatorial campaign ===
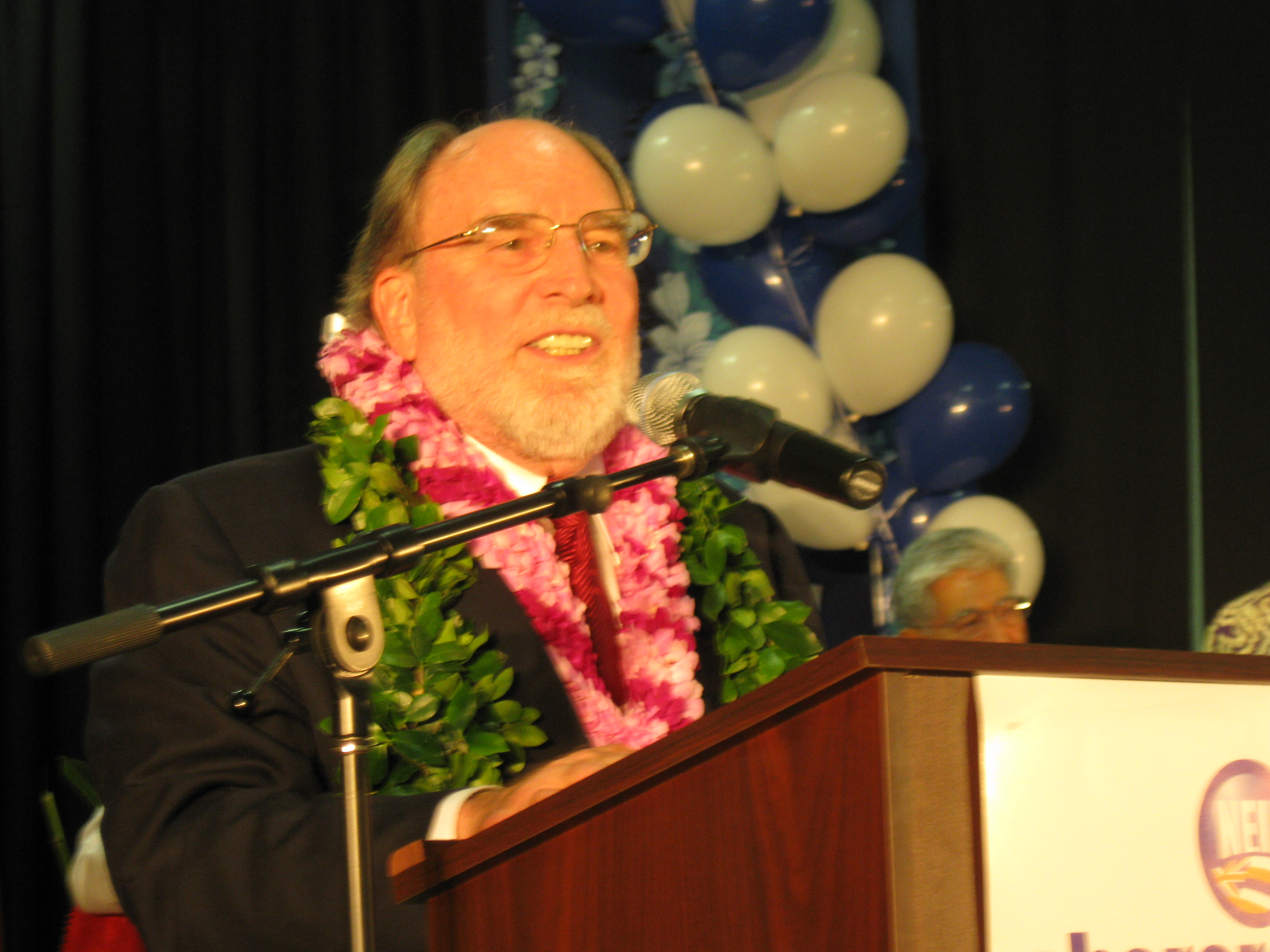
Abercrombie celebrating his 2010 victory

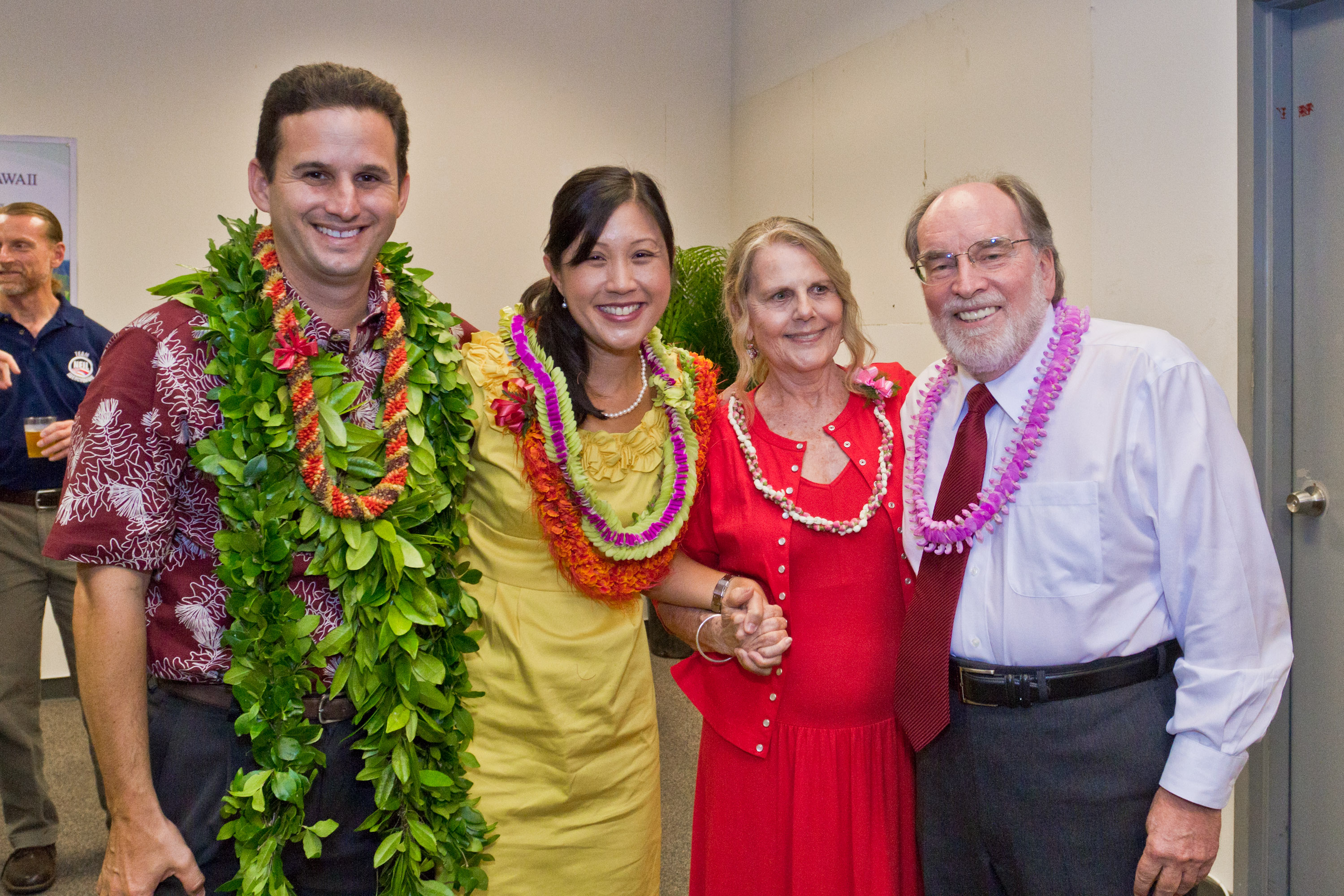
Neil Abercrombie and his running mate Brian Schatz with their spouses on the day of the election

On March 9, 2009, Abercrombie announced his candidacy for governor of Hawai'i. On December 11, 2009, he announced that he would resign from Congress to concentrate on his gubernatorial bid. He was succeeded in Congress by Republican Charles Djou, the first Republican elected to Congress from Hawai'i since Pat Saiki.

During his campaign, Abercrombie released his "A New Day in Hawai'i Plan," offering a roadmap based on Hawai'i's values and priorities. The plan was the result of conversations with thousands of people and many hours of research. Abercrombie met with business people, entrepreneurs, economists, principals, teachers, parents, academics, public employees, farmers, nonprofit leaders, health professionals, students, seniors, conservationists, cultural practitioners, construction workers, and citizens of all backgrounds. He also held dozens of issue forums and meetings on every island to hear from residents about their concerns and hopes for Hawai'i.

Abercrombie defeated his challenger, former Honolulu Mayor Mufi Hannemann, in the 2010 Democratic gubernatorial primary election on September 18, 2010, 59.3% to 37.7%.

On November 2, 2010, Abercrombie defeated Republican nominee Duke Aiona, 57.8% to 40.8%, to become Hawai'i's 7th governor. In his November 3 victory speech, he credited many people for his success, including the founder of the Department of Religion at the University of Hawaiʻi at Mānoa, Dr. Mitsuo Aoki.

=== Governor of Hawaii ===
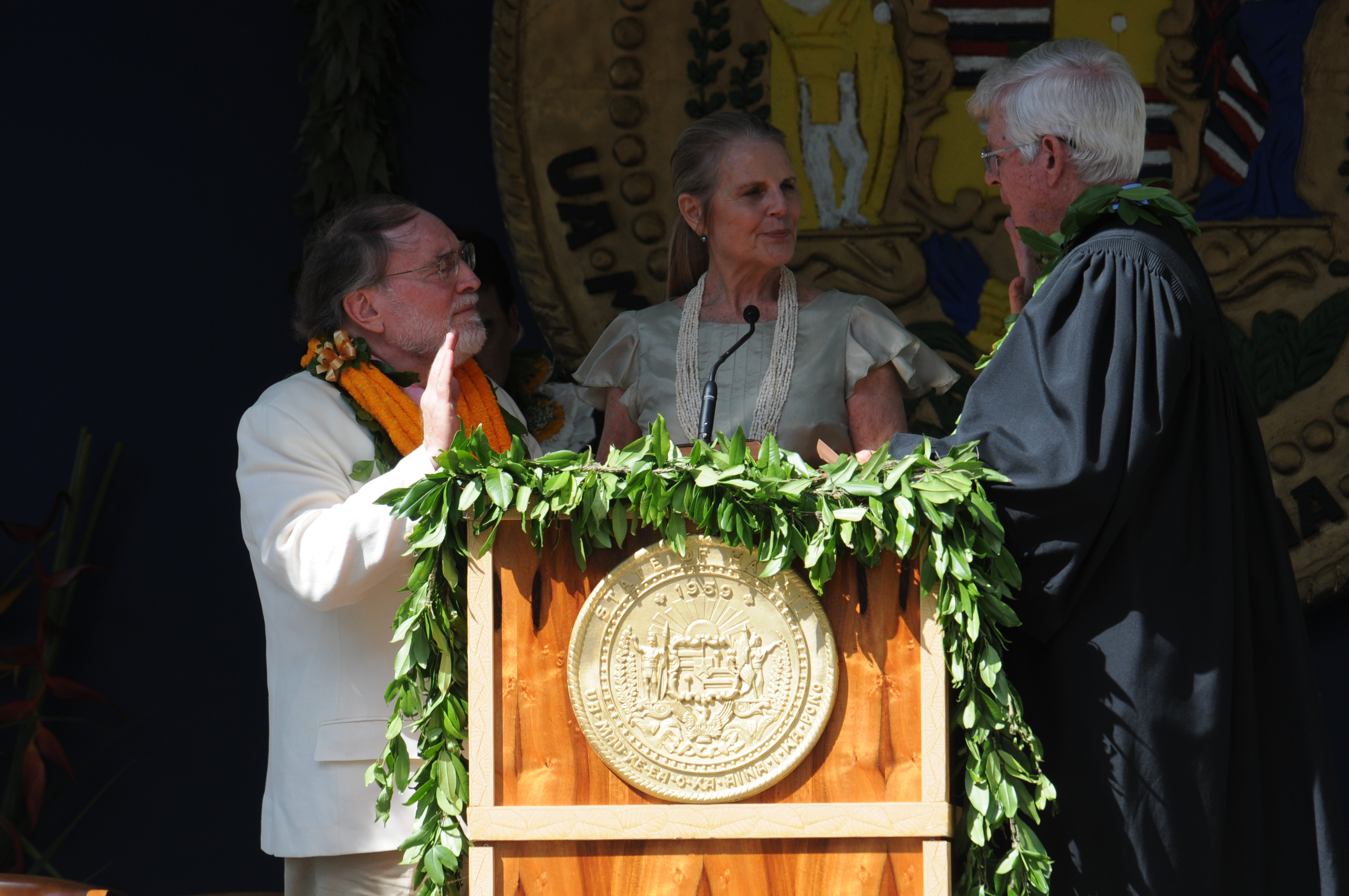
Neil Abercrombie sworn in as Governor of Hawaii by Hawaii Supreme Court Justice James Duffy

Abercrombie was sworn in as governor of Hawai'i on December 6, 2010, the first gubernatorial victor of the 2010 election cycle to be sworn into office.

Abercrombie was seventy two when he was sworn in as governor, and was the oldest current United States governor for a little less than a month. On January 3, 2011, he lost that title to Jerry Brown of California, who is two months older than Abercrombie.

When Abercrombie took office, he vowed to end the investigations into President Obama's birth certificate. A spokesperson for Abercrombie said he would ask the office of the Attorney General what it could do. State Attorney General David M. Louie informed Abercrombie that state privacy laws prevent the release of "an individual's birth documentation without the person's consent" to persons who do not have "a tangible interest" in the document.

According to polls, in October 2011, Abercrombie was the least popular governor in the country, with a 30% approval rating.

In February 2011, Abercrombie signed into law a bill legalizing civil unions. His predecessor, Linda Lingle, had vetoed the legislation. In 2013, he called the Hawai'i Legislature into a special session to consider a bill legalizing same-sex marriage, which he signed into law on November 13.

Upon the death of longtime Senator Daniel Inouye, Abercrombie had to appoint his replacement. The State Democratic Party gave him a list of three finalists and he chose Lieutenant Governor Brian Schatz, despite Inouye's stated wish that he select Colleen Hanabusa. Schatz is now Hawai'i's senior U.S. Senator.

Obama appointed Abercrombie to the Council of Governors, and he served from 2012 to 2014. The council consists of 10 governors the president appoints to focus on national security, homeland defense, and synchronization and integration of state and federal military activities in the United States and matters of mutual interest pertaining to the National Guard.

In November 2013, Abercrombie was named to Obama's Task Force on Climate Preparedness and Resilience, a group of governors, mayors and other leaders who were to develop recommendations on how the federal government could better support local preparedness and resilience-building efforts. Hawai'i also signed on to the Majuro Declaration as a U.S. Climate Leader in September of that year, making the state the first sub-national government to sign.

After an intense special session, Abercrombie signed into law a bill that legalized marriage for same-sex couples in Hawai'i. The new law took effect on December 2, 2013. Hawaii was the 15th state to legalize same-sex marriage.

In the August 9, 2014, Democratic gubernatorial primary, Abercrombie was defeated by state senator David Ige, taking 31% of the vote to Ige's 67%, making him the first incumbent governor to lose a primary in Hawai'i's history. The margin of defeat was the largest of any incumbent governor in U.S. history (though not the smallest share of the vote). Abercrombie had the support of President Barack Obama and had outspent Ige $4.9 million to $447,000 during the primary campaign. His confrontational style of governing, his proposal to raise taxes in the aftermath of the Great Recession, restructuring labor union pensions, and his selection of Brian Schatz over Colleen Hanabusa to fill the Senate seat vacated by Daniel Inouye's death, which was considered by some to be disrespectful of Inouye's wishes, were regarded as factors in Abercrombie's loss. Nonetheless, Schatz, who was also endorsed by Obama, defeated Hanabusa in the 2014 Democratic Senate primary and went on to win the general election.

== Personal life ==
In 1981, Abercrombie married Nancie Caraway, a political scientist and feminist writer at the University of Hawai'i at Mānoa's Globalization Research Center. Abercrombie lives in the Mānoa Valley area of Honolulu.

Abercrombie is a powerlifter and has a stated goal of bench-pressing 200 pounds more than his age on each birthday. On his 72nd birthday, he bench-pressed 272 pounds.

In 2006, Abercrombie was named "Scot of the Year" by the Caledonian Society of Hawai'i.

U.S. House of Representatives
| Preceded by Cecil Heftel | Member of the U.S. House of Representatives from Hawaii's 1st congressional district 1986–1987 | Succeeded by Pat Saiki |
| Preceded by Pat Saiki | Member of the U.S. House of Representatives from Hawaii's 1st congressional district 1991–2010 | Succeeded by Charles Djou |
Party political offices
| Preceded by Randy Iwase | Democratic nominee for Governor of Hawaii; 2010 | Succeeded by David Ige |
Political offices
| Preceded by Linda Lingle | Governor of Hawaii; 2010–2014 | Succeeded by David Ige |
U.S. order of precedence (ceremonial)
| Preceded by Linda Lingle as Former Governor | Order of precedence of the United States | Succeeded by David Ige as Former Governor |
