= Duke Aiona =

American politician

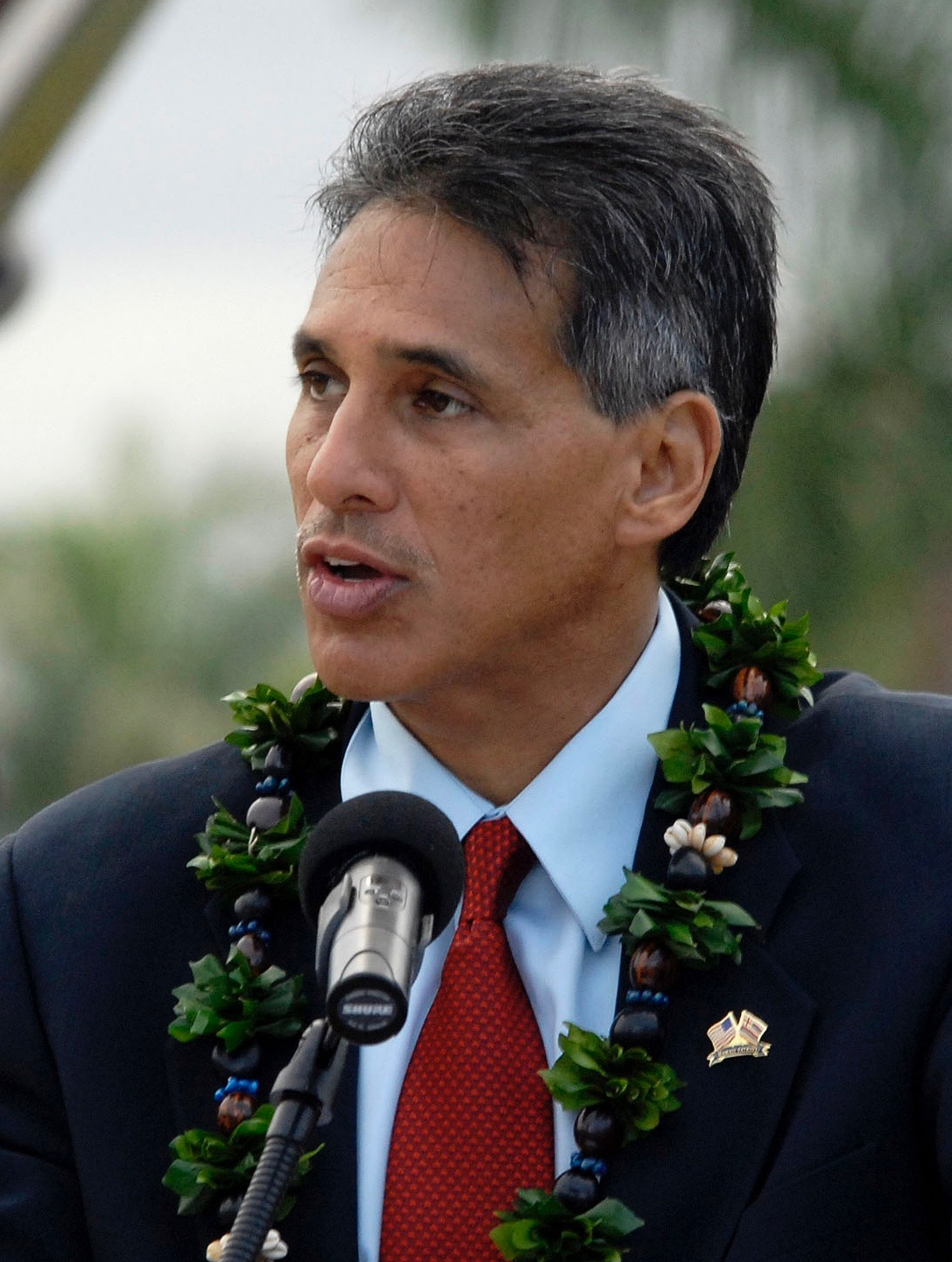
- Aiona in 2009

11th Lieutenant Governor of Hawaii
- In office December 4, 2002 – December 6, 2010
- Governor: Linda Lingle
- Preceded by: Mazie Hirono
- Succeeded by: Brian Schatz

Personal details
- Born: James Richard Aiona Jr. June 8, 1955 (age 71) Pearl City, Territory of Hawaii
- Party: Republican
- Spouse: Vivian Welsh
- Children: 4
- Education: University of the Pacific (BA); University of Hawaii, Manoa (JD)
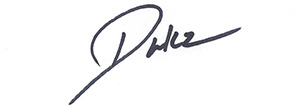
- Signature

James Richard "Duke" Aiona Jr. (born June 8, 1955) is an American politician and jurist who served as the 11th lieutenant governor of Hawaii under Linda Lingle from 2002 to 2010. A member of the Republican Party, he also served both as an attorney and a judge for the state prior to becoming lieutenant governor. Lingle and Aiona are the last and only living Republicans to have held statewide office in Hawaii.

Aiona was the Republican nominee for Governor of Hawaii in the 2010 election, but was defeated by Democrat Neil Abercrombie in the general election. He was the Republican nominee once again in the 2014 election, but lost to Democrat David Ige, since which he has done legal work and consulting. In June 2022, Aiona announced that he would run again for a third time in the Republican nomination for the 2022 election, which he lost to Democrat Josh Green, the incumbent Hawaii Lieutenant Governor.

== Background ==
James Aiona was born in Pearl City, Hawaiʻi. He is of Hawaiian and Portuguese descent on his father's side and Chinese descent on his mother's side. His mother worked as an elementary school teacher and his father worked as a life insurance agent. He attended Saint Louis School, a local academy of the Diocese of Honolulu. Upon graduating high school, Aiona played basketball at University of the Pacific in Stockton, California and pursued a bachelor of arts degree in political science, which he received from there in 1977. Aiona returned to Hawaiʻi and graduated from the William S. Richardson School of Law at the University of Hawaiʻi at Mānoa in 1981.

He began his legal career at the City and County of Honolulu as a deputy prosecutor, and was appointed to the Hawaiʻi State Judiciary in 1990 as a Family Court judge. In 1996, while serving as Circuit Court judge, Aiona became the first administrative judge and primary architect of the Drug Court Program in Hawaiʻi. The program gives non-violent offenders a chance to stay out of prison through active and effective drug rehabilitation.

In 1977, while attending law school, he met Vivian Welsh at a dance in Waikīkī. They married in 1981. They have two sons, Kulia and Makana; and two daughters, Ohulani and Kaimilani. As lieutenant governor, Aiona was paid $117,312 per annum.

== Electoral history ==
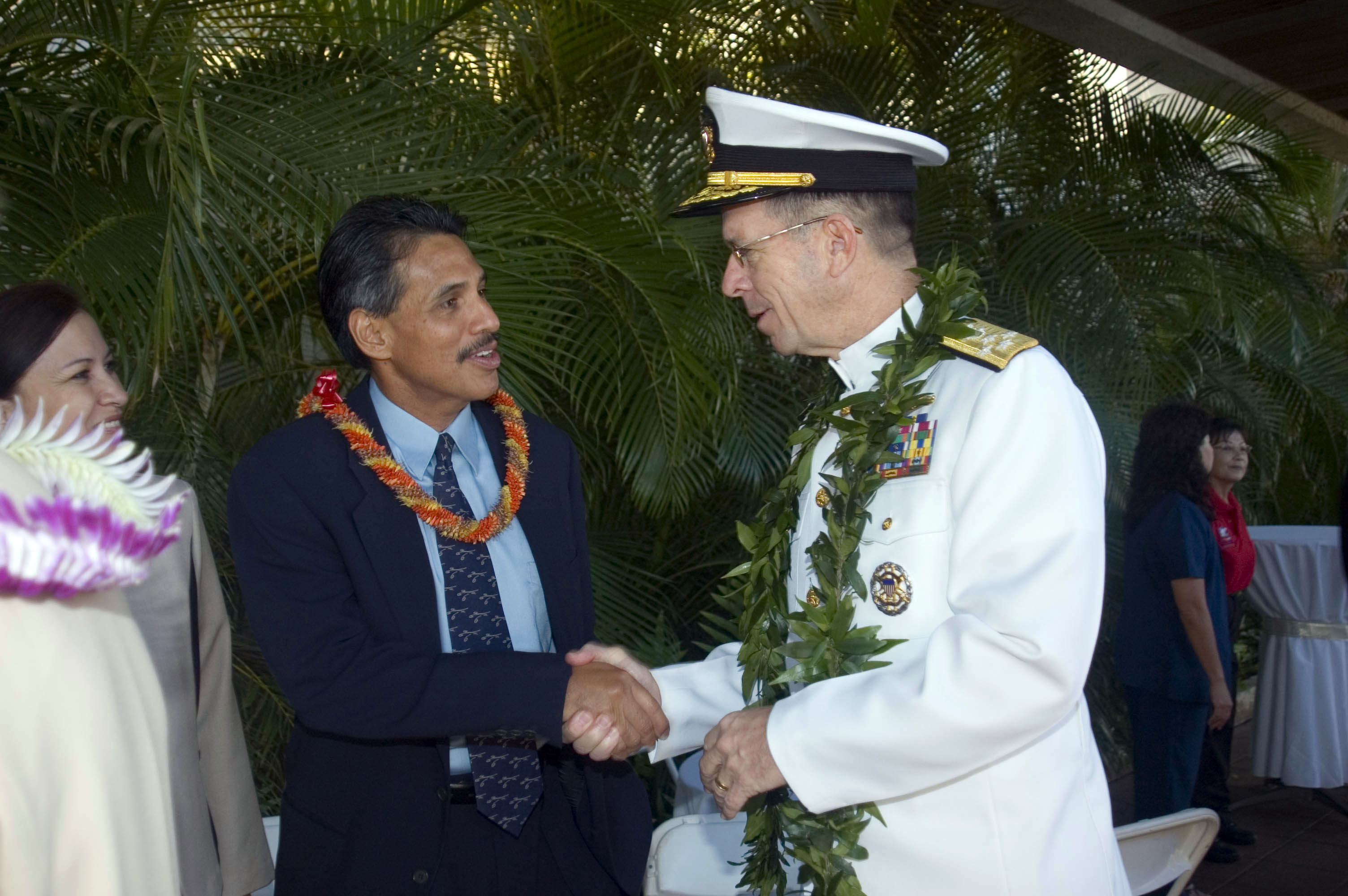
Lt Governor Aiona attending the 64th commemoration of the Attack on Pearl Harbor

Aiona and Governor Linda Lingle became Hawaii's first Republican administration to win a second term, and they won with the largest margin of victory in any gubernatorial race in the history of the state until his own loss to Josh Green in 2022. Aiona ran to succeed Lingle as governor in 2010, but lost to Neil Abercrombie; he ran for governor again in 2014, losing to Democrat David Ige. In 2022, Aiona ran for governor a third time. He won the Republican nomination but was defeated in a landslide by the Democratic nominee, lieutenant governor Josh Green.

2002 Hawaii gubernatorial election
Party	Candidate	Votes	%	±%
Republican	Linda Lingle/James Aiona	194,338	51.6	
Democratic	Mazie Hirono/Matt Matsunaga	177,186	47.0	

2006 Hawaii gubernatorial election
Party	Candidate	Votes	%	±%
Republican	Linda Lingle/James Aiona (incumbent)	215,313	62.5	+10.9
Democratic	Randy Iwase/Malama Solomon	121,717	35.4	−11.6

2010 Hawaii gubernatorial election
Party	Candidate	Votes	%	±%
Democratic	Neil Abercrombie / Brian Schatz	222,724	57.8	+22.4
Republican	James Aiona / Lynn Finnegan	157,311	40.8	−21.7
Turnout		380,035	55.7	

2014 Hawaii gubernatorial election
Party	Candidate	Votes	%	±%
Democratic	David Ige / Shan Tsutsui	181,106	49.45	−8.35
Republican	James Aiona / Elwin Ahu	135,775	37.08	−3.72
Independent	Mufi Hannemann / Les Chang	42,934	11.72	N/A
Total votes		366,210	100.00	N/A

2022 Hawaii gubernatorial election
Party	Candidate	Votes	%	±%
Democratic	Josh Green / Sylvia Luke	259,901	63.2	+0.54
Republican	James Aiona / Seaula Tupa'i Jr.	151,258	36.8	+3.09
Total votes		411,159	100.00	N/A

== See also ==
- List of minority governors and lieutenant governors in the United States

Political offices
Preceded by Mazie Hirono	Lieutenant Governor of Hawaii; 2002–2010	Succeeded by Brian Schatz
Party political offices
Preceded by Stan Koki	Republican nominee for Lieutenant Governor of Hawaii; 2002, 2006	Succeeded by Lynn Finnegan
Preceded by Linda Lingle	Republican nominee for Governor of Hawaii; 2010, 2014	Succeeded by Andria Tupola
Preceded by Andria Tupola	Republican nominee for Governor of Hawaii; 2022	Succeeded by Gary Cordery
