= Honolulu Civil Beat =

American news organization and website

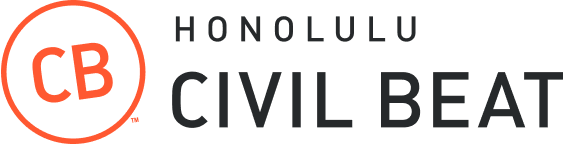
- Website type: News website
- Available in: English
- Headquarters: Honolulu, Hawaii
- Owner: Honolulu Civil Beat Inc.
- Founders: Pierre Omidyar and Randy Ching
- Editor: Amy Pyle
- Website: civilbeat.org
- Commercial: No
- Launched: May 2010; 16 years ago

Honolulu Civil Beat is a nonprofit online news organization covering the U.S. state of Hawaii. It specializes in investigative reporting, watchdog journalism and in-depth enterprise coverage.

== History ==
Pierre Omidyar launched Civil Beat in May 2010 with a subscription paywall. Its founding editor was Pulitzer Prize winning journalist John Temple, former editor and publisher of the Rocky Mountain News. When Temple left to take a position at The Washington Post in 2012, journalist Patti Epler was promoted to executive editor.

In 2012, as part of an investigation of municipal law enforcement, Civil Beat sued the City and County of Honolulu for access to public records. In 2013, Huffington Post launched a Hawaii issues and travel-oriented site in partnership with Civil Beat. HuffPost Hawaii staff share office space with the Civil Beat staff.

In 2016, the publication became a non-profit and its paywall was dropped.

== Operation ==
Civil Beat has a board of directors that has included publisher Pierre Omidyar.

Civil Beat gets revenue from subscriptions along with funding from Omidyar. Other sponsorships have come from local businesses and nonprofits, such as the law firm of Alston Hunt Floyd & Ing, Appleseed Center and Honolulu Museum of Art which together provided underwriting for a reporting project in Micronesia, and D.R. Horton, which provided underwriting for a series on Hawaii's high cost of living.

Besides the partnership with The Huffington Post, Civil Beat has media partnerships with Hawaii Public Radio, KITV and Clear Channel/KHVH. Civil Beat provides content and analysis for other news organizations including National Public Radio.

Civil Beat is headquartered in Honolulu, on the island of Oahu. Articles written by Civil Beat journalists have been featured in the New York Times and are often referenced and quoted in other news sources. Civil Beat staff contribute to local talk radio programs.

As of 2011, Civil Beat's competitors include the state's major newspaper, the Honolulu Star-Advertiser.

Honolulu Civil Beat is a member of the Institute for Nonprofit News.

== Awards ==
The Greater Oregon and the Indiana chapters of the Society of Professional Journalists (SPJ) gave its award for "best overall news site" in Hawaii to Honolulu Civil Beat in 2011 and 2012. In 2017, editor Richard Wiens announced it had won best online newsite (the Louisville chapter judged 2016), marking 7 years in a row the paper had won the title.

In May 2024, the publication was named a finalist for the Pulitzer Prize for Breaking News Reporting, for its coverage of the 2023 Hawaii wildfires.
