= 2016 United States Senate election in Hawaii =

- November 8, 2016
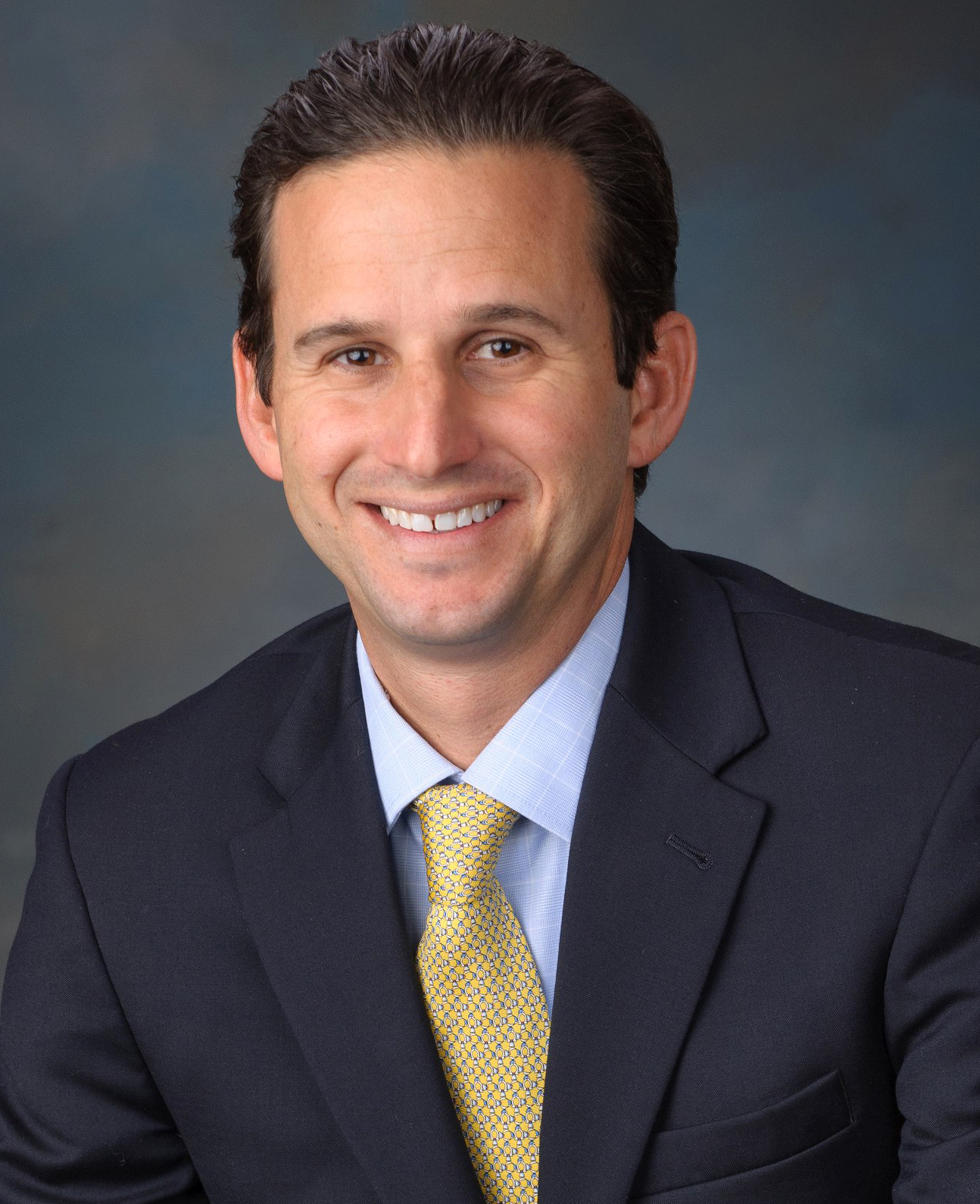

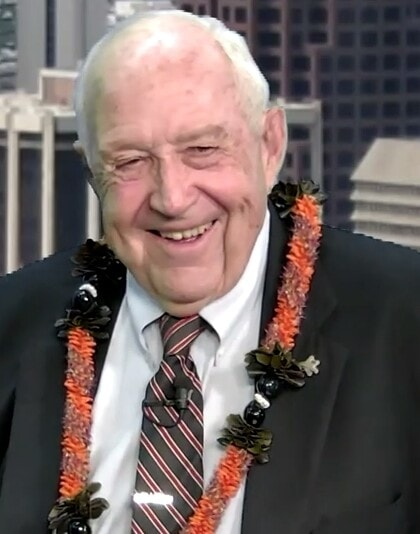
Nominee	Brian Schatz	John Carroll
Party	Democratic	Republican
Popular vote	306,604	92,653
Percentage	73.61%	22.24%
- Schatz: 40–50% 50–60% 60–70% 70–80% 80–90% >90% No votes
U.S. senator before election
Brian Schatz
Democratic
Elected U.S. Senator
Brian Schatz
Democratic

The 2016 United States Senate election in Hawaii was held November 8, 2016, concurrently with the 2016 U.S. presidential election as well as other elections to the United States Senate and House of Representatives and various state and local elections. The primaries were held August 13. Incumbent Democratic U.S. Senator Brian Schatz won reelection to his first full term in office, defeating Republican former state legislator John Carroll.

== Background ==
In 2011, Daniel Inouye announced that he planned to run for a record tenth term in 2016, when he would have been 92 years old. He also said, "I have told my staff and I have told my family that when the time comes, when you question my sanity or question my ability to do things physically or mentally, I don't want you to hesitate, do everything to get me out of here, because I want to make certain the people of Hawaii get the best representation possible."

Inouye died on December 17, 2012. Hawaii Governor Neil Abercrombie appointed Lieutenant Governor Brian Schatz, a Democrat, to succeed Inouye. Schatz won a 2014 special election to serve the remainder of Inouye's term.

== Democratic primary ==
=== Candidates ===
==== Declared ====
- Makani Christensen
- Tutz Honeychurch
- Arturo Reyes, perennial candidate
- Brian Schatz, incumbent senator
- Miles Shiratori

==== Declined ====
- Colleen Hanabusa, former U.S. Representative and candidate for the U.S. Senate in 2014 (running for HI-01)
- Mark Takai, U.S. Representative (died)
- Tulsi Gabbard, U.S. Representative (running for reelection)

==== Former ====
- Daniel Inouye, U.S. Senator from Hawaii (1963–2012), U.S. Representative for Hawaii's at-large congressional district (1959–1963). Inouye had declared his intent to run for re-election to a record tenth term, but he died in office on December 17, 2012.

=== Results ===
Democratic primary results
Party	Candidate	Votes	%
Democratic	Brian Schatz (incumbent)	162,891	86.17%
Democratic	Makani Christensen	11,898	6.29%
Democratic	Miles Shiratori	8,620	4.56%
Democratic	Arturo Reyes	3,819	2.02%
Democratic	Tutz Honeychurch	1,815	0.96%
Total votes		189,043	100.00%

== Republican primary ==
=== Candidates ===
==== Declared ====
- John Carroll, former State Senator, former State Representative, nominee for US Senate in 2000 and perennial candidate
- Karla Gottschalk, attorney
- Eddie Pirkowski, perennial candidate
- John Roco, perennial candidate

==== Withdrew ====
- Charles Collins, candidate for the U.S. Senate in 2012 and for Governor of Hawaii in 2014

==== Declined ====
- Cam Cavasso, former state representative and Republican nominee for the U.S. Senate in 2004, 2010, and 2014
- Charles Djou, former U.S. Representative (running for Mayor of Honolulu)

=== Results ===
Results by county: Carroll—70–80% Carroll—60–70%

Republican primary results
Party	Candidate	Votes	%
Republican	John Carroll	26,747	74.58%
Republican	John P. Roco	3,956	11.03%
Republican	Karla Gottschalk	3,045	8.49%
Republican	Eddie Pirkowski	2,114	5.89%
Total votes		35,862	100.00%

== Other primaries ==
=== Libertarian ===
==== Candidates ====
===== Declared =====
- Michael Kokoski, nominee for the U.S. Senate in 2014

==== Results ====
Libertarian primary results
Party	Candidate	Votes	%
Libertarian	Michael Kokoski	909	100.00%
Total votes		909	100.00%

=== Constitution ===
==== Candidates ====
===== Declared =====
- Joy Allison, independent candidate for the U.S. Senate in 2014

==== Results ====
Constitution primary results
Party	Candidate	Votes	%
Constitution	Joy Allison	217	100.00%
Total votes		217	100.00%

=== American Shopping ===
==== Candidates ====
===== Declared =====
- John Giuffre

==== Results ====
American Shopping primary results
Party	Candidate	Votes	%
American Shopping	John Giuffre	111	100.00%
Total votes		111	100.00%

== General election ==
Schatz defeated Carroll on election day, winning his second election to the U.S. Senate and his first full term after being appointed to the seat in 2012 following the death of Daniel Inouye. This was his largest margin of victory, as he won over 4% more of the electorate in this election.

=== Fundraising ===
Candidate	Raised	Spent	Cash on Hand
Brian Schatz (D)	$3,316,074	$1,195,572	$3,074,380
John Carroll (R)			

=== Predictions ===
Source	Ranking	As of
The Cook Political Report	Safe D	November 2, 2016
Sabato's Crystal Ball	Safe D	November 7, 2016
Rothenberg Political Report	Safe D	November 3, 2016
Daily Kos	Safe D	November 8, 2016
Real Clear Politics	Safe D	November 7, 2016

=== Polling ===
Poll source	Date(s) administered	Sample size	Margin of error	Brian Schatz (D)	John Carroll (R)	Undecided
SurveyMonkey	November 1–7, 2016	426	± 4.6%	70%	26%	4%
SurveyMonkey	October 31–November 6, 2016	426	± 4.6%	67%	29%	4%
SurveyMonkey	October 28–November 3, 2016	435	± 4.6%	68%	26%	6%
SurveyMonkey	October 27–November 2, 2016	424	± 4.6%	70%	26%	4%
SurveyMonkey	October 26–November 1, 2016	428	± 4.6%	70%	26%	4%
SurveyMonkey	October 25–31, 2016	467	± 4.6%	69%	27%	4%

=== Results ===
United States Senate election in Hawaii, 2016
Party	Candidate	Votes	%	±%
Democratic	Brian Schatz (incumbent)	306,604	73.61%	+3.83%
Republican	John Carroll	92,653	22.24%	−5.46%
Constitution	Joy Allison	9,103	2.19%	N/A
Libertarian	Michael Kokowski	6,809	1.63%	−0.89%
American Shopping	John Giuffre	1,393	0.33%	N/A
Total votes		416,562	100.00%	N/A
Democratic hold				

==== By county ====
By county

County	Brian Schatz Democratic		John Carroll Republican		All Others	
County	#	%	#	%	#	%
Hawaii	47,003	74.59%	12,766	20.26%	3,246	5.15%
Honolulu	203,372	72.98%	64,939	23.3%	10,345	3.71%
Kauaʻi	19,015	76.13%	4,745	19.0%	1,216	4.87%
Maui	37,214	74.55%	10,203	20.44%	2,498	5.01%
Totals	306,604	73.6%	92,653	22.24%	17,305	4.15%

==== By congressional district ====
Schatz won both congressional districts.

District	Schatz	Carroll	Representative
1st	74%	22%	Colleen Hanabusa
2nd	73%	22%	Tulsi Gabbard
