= 2018 United States House of Representatives elections in Hawaii =

- November 6, 2018

All 2 Hawaii seats to the United States House of Representatives
- Turnout: 50.5%
	Majority party	Minority party
Party	Democratic	Republican
Last election	2	0
Seats won	2	0
Seat change	Steady	Steady
Popular vote	287,921	87,348
Percentage	75.31%	22.85%
Swing	▼1.29%	▲2.11%

Democratic
70–80%
80–90%
90–100%

The 2018 United States House of Representatives elections in Hawaii were held on Tuesday, November 6, 2018, to elect the two U.S. representatives from the U.S. state of Hawaii, one from each of the state's two congressional districts. Primaries were held on August 11, 2018. The elections and primaries coincided with the elections and primaries of other federal and state offices.

With the 2018 election results, the Democratic Party easily retained both House seats and retained unitary control over the entirety of Hawaii's Congressional (both House and Senate) delegation.

== Overview ==
Results of the 2018 United States House of Representatives elections in Hawaii by district:

District	Democratic		Republican		Others		Total		Result
District	Votes	%	Votes	%	Votes	%	Votes	%	Result
District 1	134,650	73.04%	42,498	23.05%	7,200	3.91%	184,348	100.0%	Democratic hold
District 2	153,271	77.34%	44,850	22.63%	53	0.03%	198,174	100.0%	Democratic hold
Total	287,921	75.27%	87,348	22.83%	7,253	1.90%	382,522	100.0%	

== District 1 ==
2018 Hawaii's 1st congressional district election
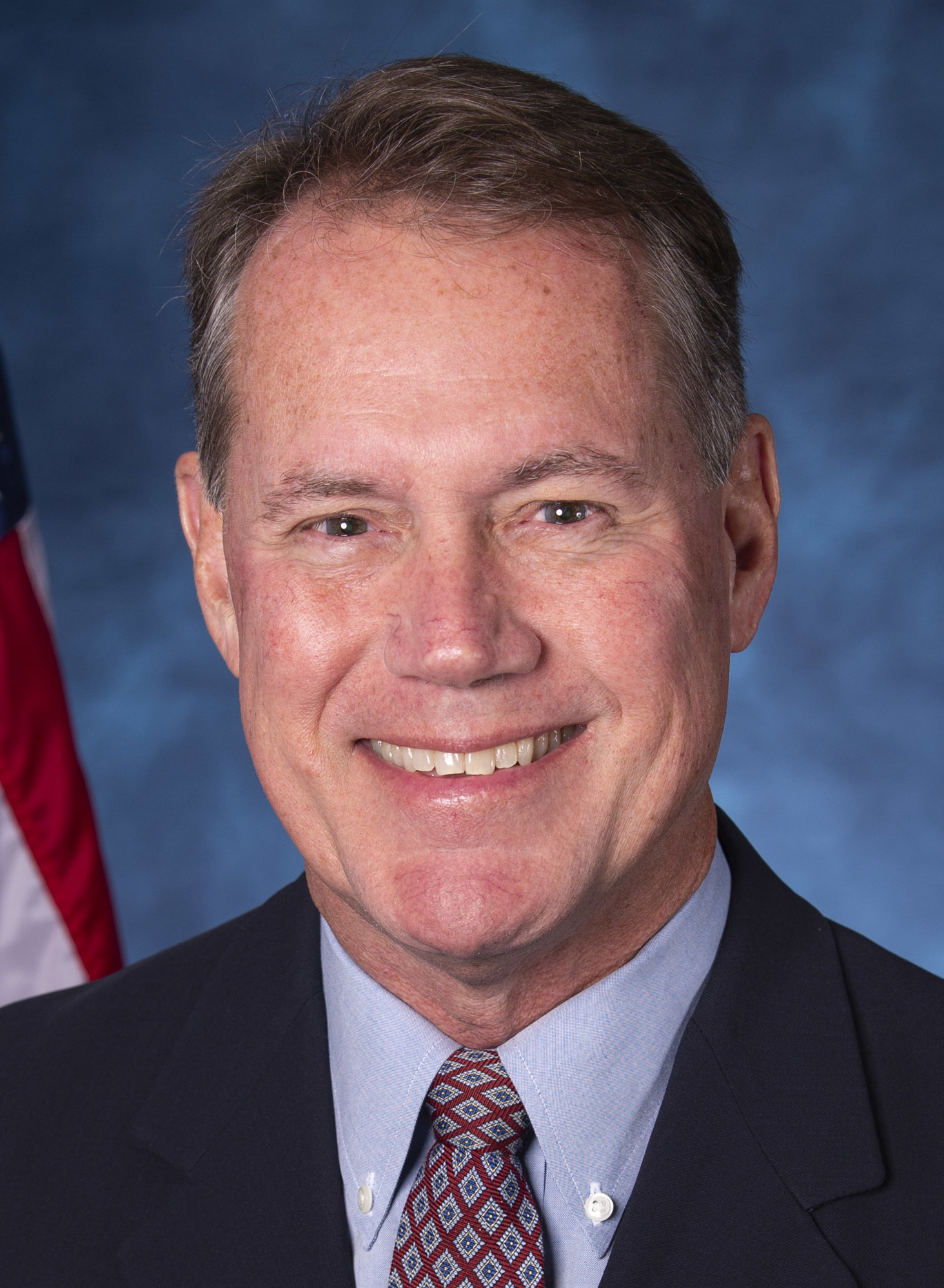

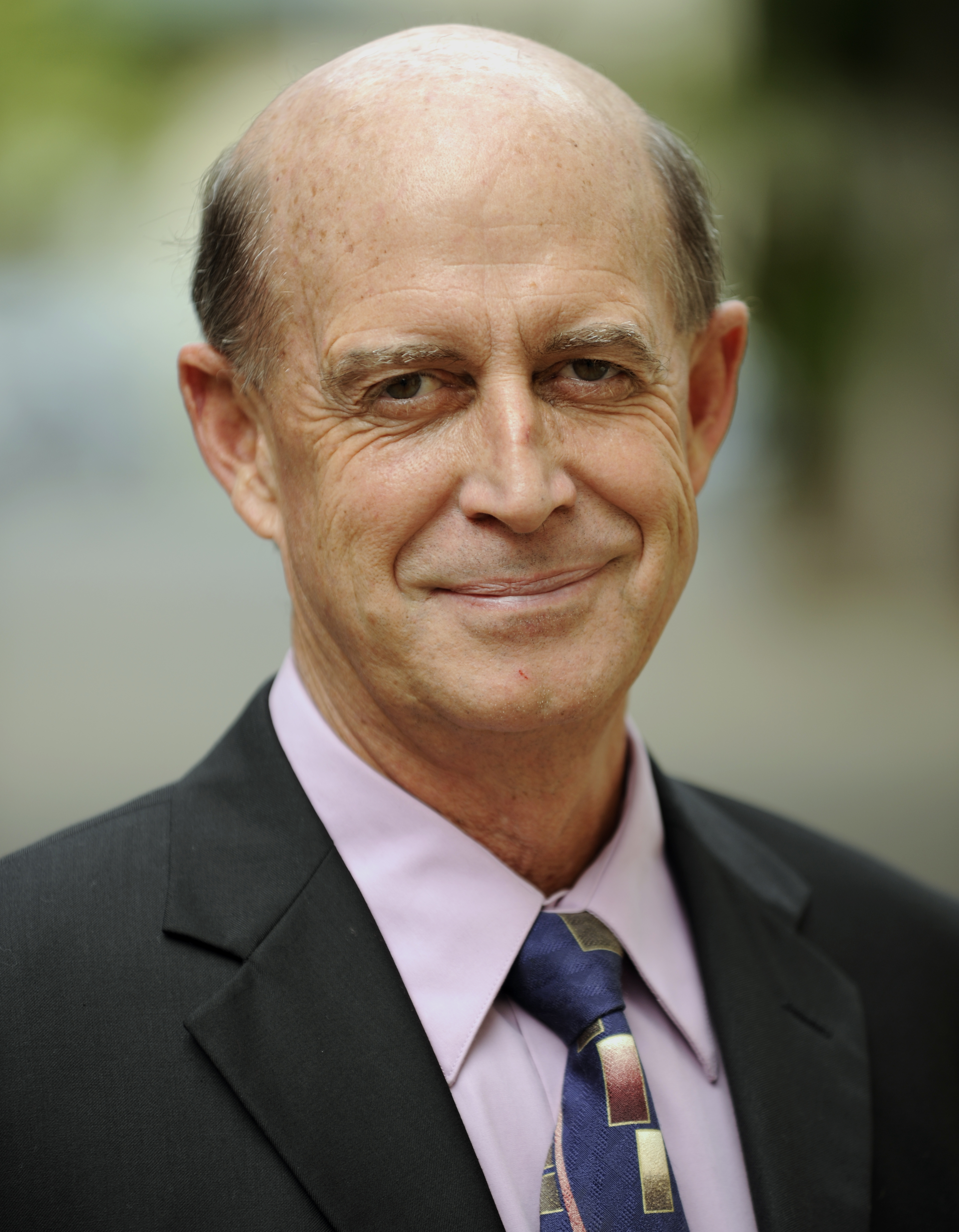
Nominee	Ed Case	Campbell Cavasso
Party	Democratic	Republican
Popular vote	134,650	42,498
Percentage	73.1%	23.1%
- Precinct results Case: 40–50% 50–60% 60–70% 70–80% 80–90% No votes
U.S. Representative before election
Colleen Hanabusa
Democratic
Elected U.S. Representative
Ed Case
Democratic

The incumbent was Democrat Colleen Hanabusa, who had represented the district since 2017 and from 2011 to 2015. Hanabusa was elected with 68% of the vote in 2016. She retired to seek the 2018 Democratic nomination for governor of Hawaii.

=== Democratic primary ===
- Ed Case, former U.S. representative
- Doug Chin, lieutenant governor of Hawaii
- Beth Fukumoto, state representative, former Republican Minority Leader
- Kaniela Ing, state representative
- Donna Mercado Kim, state senator
- Ernie Martin, Honolulu City Councilman
- Sam Puletasi, former federal agent

==== Endorsements ====
Doug Chin

Trade unions

- American Federation of Government Employees
- Hawaii State Teachers Association
- International Federation of Professional and Technical Engineers

Organizations

- End Citizens United
Beth Fukumoto

Trade unions

- University of Hawaii Professional Association
Kaniela Ing

U.S. representatives

- Pramila Jayapal (D-WA-7)
- Ro Khanna (D-CA-17)

State representatives

- Sylvia Luke (D-HI-25)
- Takashi Ohno (D-HI-27)

Individuals

- Jim Dean, activist
- Abdul El-Sayed, Democratic candidate for governor of Michigan
- Shaun King, journalist and activist
- Howie Klein, activist
- Bill McKibben, environmentalist
- Alexandria Ocasio-Cortez, then the Democratic nominee for New York's 14th congressional district
- Cenk Uygur, host of The Young Turks

Trade unions

- National Nurses United
- United Food and Commercial Workers

Organizations

- Democratic Socialists of America
- Democracy for America
- Justice Democrats
- Our Revolution
- People for the American Way
- The People for Bernie Sanders
- Progressive Change Campaign Committee
- Working Families Party
Ernie Martin

Trade unions

- State of Hawaii Organization of Police Officers
Donna Mercado Kim

Local and statewide politicians

- John Waihee, former governor of Hawaii

Individuals

- Lee Donahue, former Honolulu Chief of Police
- June Jones, football coach
- Roy Yamaguchi, celebrity chef

Trade unions

- Hawaii Government Employees Association (HGEA), AFSCME Local 152, AFL–CIO
- International Longshore and Warehouse Union Local 142
- International Union of Painters and Allied Trades District Council 50
- United Brotherhood of Carpenters and Joiners of America Local 745

==== Polling ====
Poll source	Date(s) administered	Sample size	Margin of error	Ed Case	Doug Chin	Beth Fukumoto	Kaniela Ing	Ernie Martin	Donna Mercado Kim	Undecided
Merriman River Group	July 19–21, 2018	403	± 4.9%	34%	19%	5%	6%	3%	15%	18%
Mason-Dixon	July 6–11, 2018	244	± 6.4%	36%	27%	1%	6%	2%	14%	14%
Merriman River Group	May 3–5, 2018	321	± 5.5%	–	19%	11%	8%	4%	26%	32%

==== Primary results ====
Democratic primary results
Party	Candidate	Votes	%
Democratic	Ed Case	47,491	40.0
Democratic	Doug Chin	30,290	25.5
Democratic	Donna Mercado Kim	21,563	18.2
Democratic	Kaniela Saito Ing	7,539	6.4
Democratic	Beth Keiko Fukumoto	7,476	6.3
Democratic	Ernie Yorihiko Martin	3,827	3.2
Democratic	Sam Puletasi	519	0.4
Total votes		118,705	100.0

=== Republican primary ===
- Campbell Cavasso, former state representative, and 2004, 2010, and 2014 Republican nominee for U.S. Senate
- Raymond Vinole, small business owner

==== Primary results ====
Republican primary results
Party	Candidate	Votes	%
Republican	Campbell Cavasso	10,564	81.9
Republican	Raymond Vinole	2,342	18.1
Total votes		12,906	100.0

=== Green primary ===
==== Primary results ====
Green primary results
Party	Candidate	Votes	%
Green	Zachary B. Burd	173	100.0
Total votes		173	100.0

=== Libertarian primary ===
==== Primary results ====
Libertarian primary results
Party	Candidate	Votes	%
Libertarian	Michelle Rose Tippens	150	100.0
Total votes		150	100.0

=== Nonpartisan primary ===
==== Primary results ====
Nonpartisan primary results
Party	Candidate	Votes	%
Nonpartisan	Calvin C. Griffin	266	58.7
Nonpartisan	John E. Cipolla	187	41.3
Total votes		453	100.0

=== General election ===
==== Predictions ====
Source	Ranking	As of
The Cook Political Report	Safe D	November 5, 2018
Inside Elections	Safe D	November 5, 2018
Sabato's Crystal Ball	Safe D	November 5, 2018
RCP	Safe D	November 5, 2018
Daily Kos	Safe D	November 5, 2018
538	Safe D	November 7, 2018
CNN	Safe D	October 31, 2018
Politico	Safe D	November 2, 2018

==== Results ====
Hawaii's 1st congressional district, 2018
Party	Candidate	Votes	%
Democratic	Ed Case	134,650	73.1
Republican	Campbell Cavasso	42,498	23.1
Libertarian	Michelle Tippens	3,498	1.9
Green	Zach Burd	2,214	1.2
Nonpartisan	Calvin Griffin	1,351	0.7
Total votes		184,211	100.0
Democratic hold			

== District 2 ==
2018 Hawaii's 2nd congressional district election
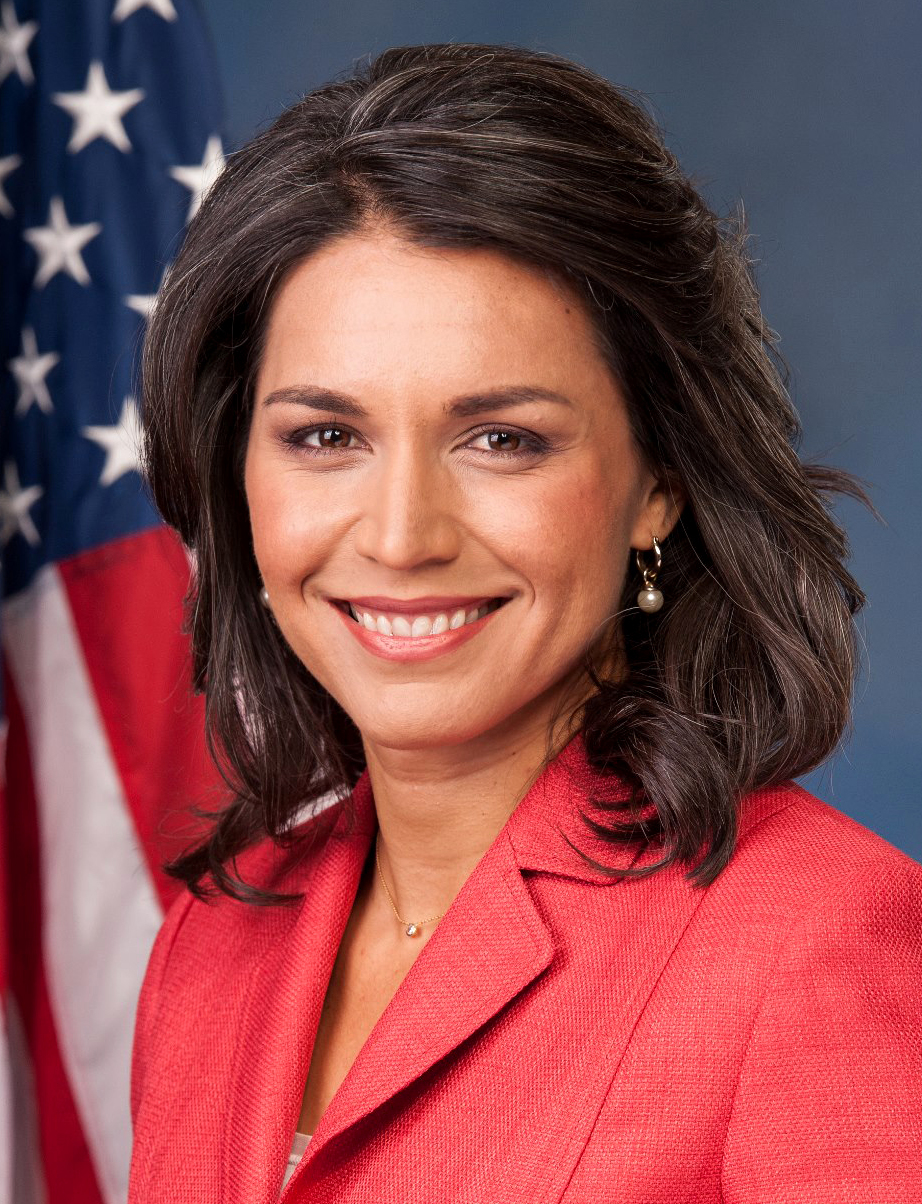

Nominee	Tulsi Gabbard	Brian Evans
Party	Democratic	Republican
Popular vote	153,271	44,850
Percentage	77.4%	22.6%
- Precinct results Gabbard: 60–70% 70–80% 80–90% >90% Evans: 50–60% 60–70% No votes
U.S. Representative before election
Tulsi Gabbard
Democratic
Elected U.S. Representative
Tulsi Gabbard
Democratic

The incumbent was Democrat Tulsi Gabbard, who had represented the district since 2013. She was re-elected with 76% of the vote in 2016.

=== Democratic primary ===
- Anthony Tony Austin
- Sherry Campagna
- Tulsi Gabbard, incumbent

==== Polling ====
Poll source	Date(s) administered	Sample size	Margin of error	Sherry Campagna	Tulsi Gabbard	Undecided
Merriman River Group	July 19–21, 2018	468	± 4.5%	16%	69%	15%

==== Primary results ====
2018 Hawaii's 2nd congressional district Democratic primary results by county Map legend: Gabbard—80–90%; Gabbard—70–80%; No data

Democratic primary results
Party	Candidate	Votes	%
Democratic	Tulsi Gabbard (incumbent)	94,665	83.5
Democratic	Sherry Alu Campagna	13,947	12.4
Democratic	Anthony Tony Austin	4,692	4.1
Total votes		113,304	100.0

=== Republican primary ===
- Brian Evans, singer, Democratic candidate for senator in 2004 and 2014

==== Primary results ====
Republican primary results
Party	Candidate	Votes	%
Republican	Brian Evans	12,337	100.0
Total votes		12,337	100.00

=== General election ===
==== Predictions ====
Source	Ranking	As of
The Cook Political Report	Safe D	November 5, 2018
Inside Elections	Safe D	November 5, 2018
Sabato's Crystal Ball	Safe D	November 5, 2018
RCP	Safe D	November 5, 2018
Daily Kos	Safe D	November 5, 2018
538	Safe D	November 7, 2018
CNN	Safe D	October 31, 2018
Politico	Safe D	November 4, 2018

==== Results ====
Hawaii's 2nd congressional district, 2018
Party	Candidate	Votes	%
Democratic	Tulsi Gabbard (incumbent)	153,271	77.4
Republican	Brian Evans	44,850	22.6
Total votes		198,121	100.0
Democratic hold			
