= Makani Christensen =

American politician

politician

Personal details
- Education: United States Naval Academy
- Known for: politics, volunteer

Makani Christensen was a 2016 Democratic Party candidate for the U.S. Senate seat in Hawaii. He was defeated in the primary race by Brian Schatz. He was the chair of the Oʻahu Aha Moku Advisory Committee, of which advises the state of Hawaii. He is a combat veteran of both Iraq and Afghanistan, and a graduate of the United States Naval Academy.

== Activism ==
Makani Christensen, native Hawai'ian, is known for his volunteer efforts with his box truck while utilizing his logistical and supply management skills after the Maui fires. His brown kross box truck brought essential relief supplies and sourced resources for Lahaina survivors, after the Lahaina and Kula Fires on August 8, 2023 on Maui. Makani is also known for his organization of the volunteer efforts to continue a search for twelve Marines who died in a helicopter collision in January 2016. As executive director of the Hunting, Farming and Fishing Association, he participated in protests against the temporary closure of fishing along 3.6 miles of reef at Kaupulehu Bay. He is well known in the fishing world, helping to preserve the public right to access the ocean, as opposed to many bill proposed. He is also a member of the Maunalua Bay Recreation Advisory Committee appointed by DNLR.
