= 2014 United States Senate special election in Hawaii =

- November 4, 2014
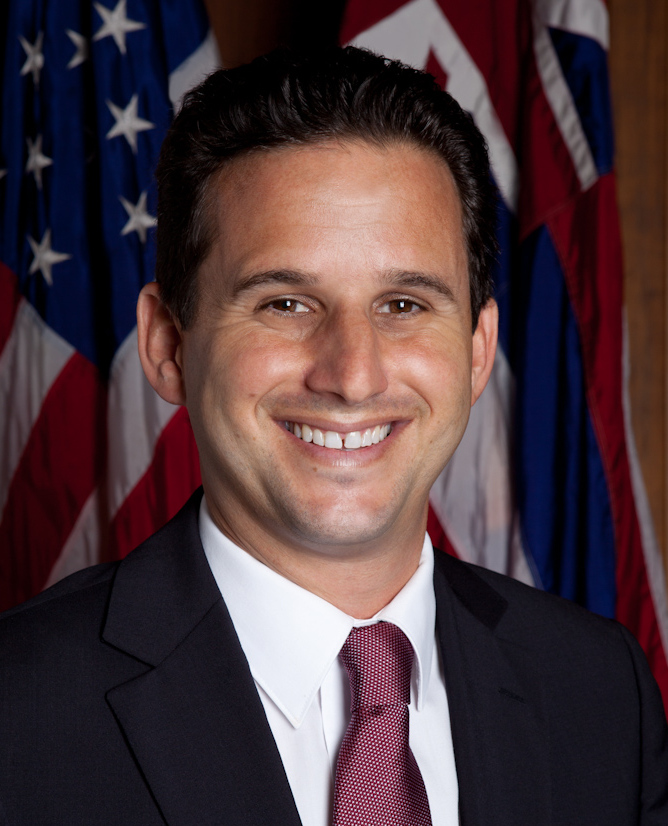

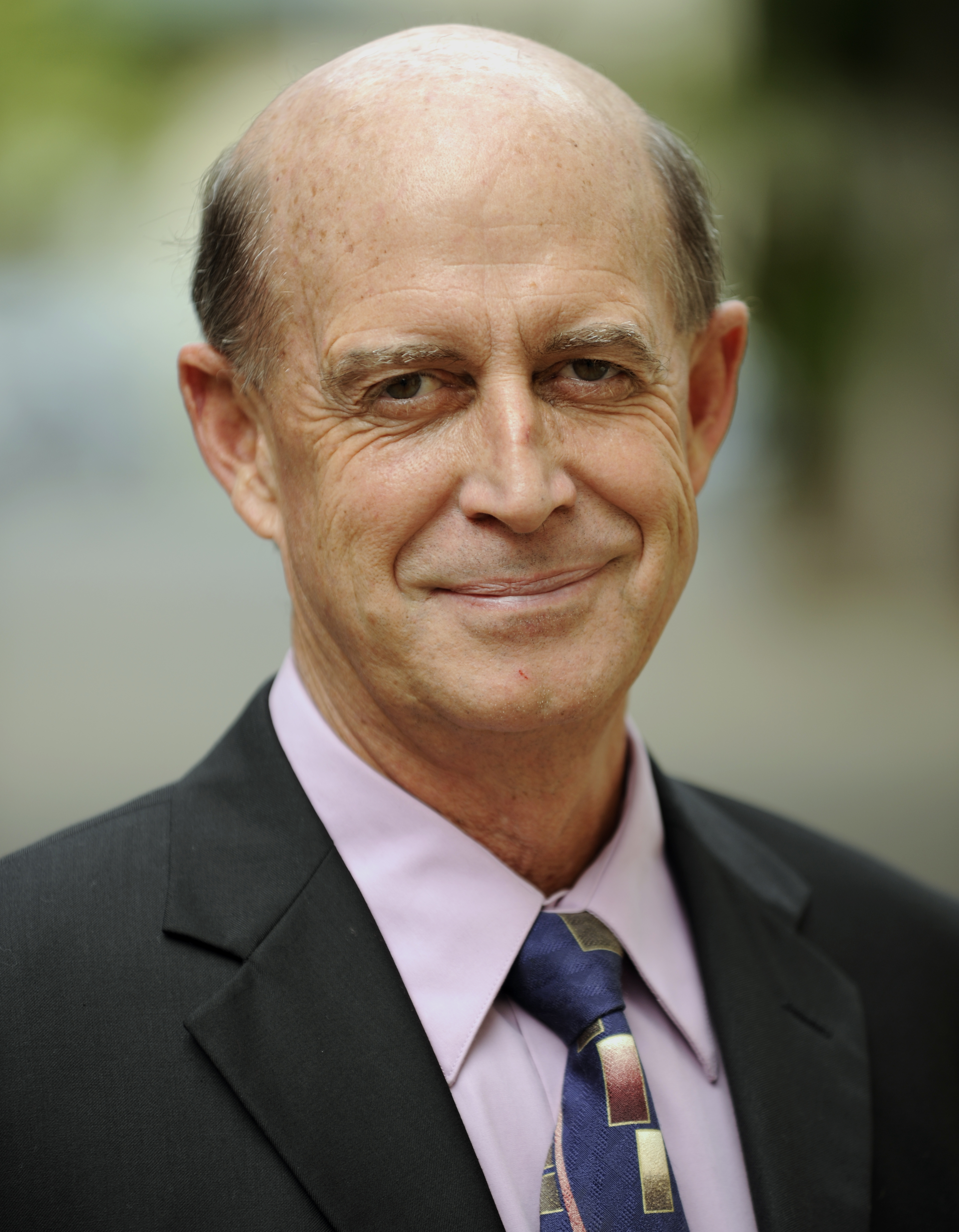
Nominee	Brian Schatz	Campbell Cavasso
Party	Democratic	Republican
Popular vote	246,827	98,006
Percentage	69.78%	27.70%
- Schatz: 40–50% 50–60% 60–70% 70–80% 80–90% >90% Cavasso: 40–50% 50–60% 60–70% No votes
U.S. senator before election
Brian Schatz (Note: In December 2012, Schatz was appointed by Governor Neil Abercrombie to fill the vacancy caused by the death of Senator Daniel Inouye.)
Democratic
Elected U.S. Senator
Brian Schatz
Democratic

The 2014 United States Senate special election in Hawaii took place on November 4, 2014, the general Election Day in the United States, concurrently with other elections to the United States Senate in other states as well as elections to the United States House of Representatives and various state and local elections.

Incumbent Democratic Senator Brian Schatz was appointed to the office in December 2012, following the death of longtime senator Daniel Inouye. The special election determined who would serve the remainder of Inouye's term, which ended on January 3, 2017.

The Hawaii primary elections took place on August 9, 2014, but the Democratic primary remained unresolved until August 15 due to areas affected by damage from Tropical Storm Iselle. Schatz narrowly fended off a primary challenge from U.S. Representative Colleen Hanabusa and then went on to defeat the Republican nominee, former state representative Campbell Cavasso, in a landslide. This was the first election since 1959 in which a non-Asian was elected to represent Hawaii in the U.S. Senate.

== Background ==
Daniel Inouye announced that he planned to run for a record tenth term in 2016, when he would have been 92 years old. He also said, "I have told my staff and I have told my family that when the time comes, when you question my sanity or question my ability to do things physically or mentally, I don't want you to hesitate, do everything to get me out of here, because I want to make certain the people of Hawaii get the best representation possible." Inouye died on December 17, 2012. He left a letter encouraging Governor Neil Abercrombie to appoint Congresswoman Colleen Hanabusa to succeed Inouye, should he become incapacitated.

Hawaii law allows the governor to appoint an interim senator "who serves until the next regularly-scheduled general election, chosen from a list of three prospective appointees that the prior incumbent's political party submits". Abercrombie appointed the lieutenant governor of Hawaii Brian Schatz as U.S. senator, citing Hanabusa's seniority on the United States House Committee on Armed Services as a chief reason not to appoint her to the position.

== Democratic primary ==
=== Candidates ===
==== Declared ====
- Brian Evans, singer and candidate for the U.S. Senate in 2004
- Colleen Hanabusa, U.S. representative
- Brian Schatz, incumbent U.S. senator

==== Declined ====
- Gil Kahele, state senator
- Esther Kia'aina, deputy director of the Hawai'i Department of Land and Natural Resources

=== Endorsements ===
Brian Schatz

Politicians

- Michael Bloomberg, former mayor of New York City
- Al Gore, former vice president of the United States
- Tom Harkin, U.S. senator (D-IA)
- Barack Obama, president of the United States
- Harry Reid, Senate Majority Leader (D-NV)
- John D. Waihee III, former governor of Hawaii
- Elizabeth Warren, U.S. senator (D-MA)

Organizations

- Council for a Livable World
- Hawaii Regional Council of Carpenters
- League of Conservation Voters
- National Weather Service Employees Organization
- Ocean Champions
- Sierra Club

Newspapers

- Honolulu Star-Advertiser
Colleen Hanabusa

Politicians

- Daniel Akaka, former U.S. senator (D-HI)
- Irene Hirano, widow of Senator Inouye

Individuals

- George Takei

Organizations

- EMILY's List

=== Debates ===
- Complete video of debate, July 14, 2014

=== Polling ===
Poll source	Date(s) administered	Sample size	Margin of error	Brian Schatz	Colleen Hanabusa	Other	Undecided
QMark Research^	February 2013	500	± 4.38%	32%	54%	—	13%
Clarity Campaigns^	June 10–11, 2013	771	± 3.53%	35%	46%	—	19%
Civil Beat	June 18–20 & 24, 2013	869	± 3.3%	36%	33%	9%	23%
Mellman Group*	June 26–30, 2013	600	± ?%	38%	37%	—	25%
Civil Beat	October 9–10, 2013	549	± 4.2%	38%	36%	—	26%
Mellman Group*	January 7–13, 2014	800	± 3.5%	41%	37%	—	22%
Hawaii Poll	January 29 – February 3, 2014	528	± 4.3%	40%	48%	—	11%
Civil Beat	February 12–15, 2014	643	± 3.9%	40%	40%	—	20%
Public Policy Polling	May 9–11, 2014	606	± 4%	49%	34%	—	17%
Civil Beat	May 18–19, 2014	520	± 4.3%	44%	39%	—	16%
Public Policy Polling	July 23–24, 2014	410	± ?	49%	39%	—	11%
Civil Beat	July 24–28, 2014	895	± 3.3%	49%	41%	—	10%
Hawaii Poll	July 21–29, 2014	458	± 4.6%	42%	50%	—	8%

- * Internal poll for Brian Schatz campaign
- ^ Internal poll for Colleen Hanabusa campaign

=== Delay in election result ===
Primary elections in Hawaii were held on August 9, 2014. However, two precincts in Puna on Hawaiʻi Island did not open due to damage from Hurricane Iselle, and the approximately 8,255 voters in those precincts instead voted on August 15. The two leading Democratic candidates, Colleen Hanabusa and Brian Schatz, were initially separated by only 1,635 votes, meaning that the outcome was officially uncertain until voting in Puna was finished. However, an analysis by Hawaii News Now showed that Hanabusa would need to win approximately 65% of the vote in the outstanding precincts to overtake Schatz, something she had not managed in any other precinct in the state. Thus, Schatz was seen as the likely winner. After voting in Puna was completed, Schatz was declared the winner by a slightly increased margin of 1,769 votes. Hanabusa conceded on August 19.

=== Results ===
Results by county: Map legend: Schatz—40–50%; Hanabusa—40–50%; Hanabusa—50–60%

Democratic primary results
Party	Candidate	Votes	%
Democratic	Brian Schatz (incumbent)	115,445	48.52%
Democratic	Colleen Hanabusa	113,663	47.77%
Democratic	Brian Evans	4,842	2.03%
Democratic	Blank vote	3,842	1.61%
Democratic	Over vote	150	0.06%
Total votes		237,942	100.00%

== Republican primary ==
=== Candidates ===
==== Declared ====
- Campbell Cavasso, former state representative and nominee for the U.S. Senate in 2004 and 2010
- Harry Friel, businessman
- Eddie Pirkowski, candidate for the U.S. Senate in 2006, 2010 and 2012
- John Roco, founder of Saint Damien Advocates and candidate for the U.S. Senate in 2010 and 2012

==== Declined ====
- Charles Djou, former U.S. representative (running for HI-01)
- Linda Lingle, former governor of Hawaii and nominee for the U.S. Senate in 2012

=== Results ===
Vote totals listed do not include two precincts that voted on August 15.

Republican primary results
Party	Candidate	Votes	%
Republican	Campbell Cavasso	25,874	58.61%
Republican	John P. Roco	4,425	10.02%
Republican	Harry J. Friel, Jr.	3,477	7.88%
Republican	Eddie Pirkowski	2,033	4.60%
Republican	Blank vote	8,306	18.81%
Republican	Over vote	34	0.08%
Total votes		44,149	100.00%

== Libertarian primary ==
=== Candidates ===
- Michael Kokoski

=== Results ===
Libertarian primary results
Party	Candidate	Votes	%
Libertarian	Michael Kokoski	568	79.89%
Libertarian	Blank vote	143	20.11%
Total votes		711	100.00%

== Independent primary ==
=== Candidates ===
- Joy Allison
- Arturo Pacheco Reyes

=== Results ===
Independent primary results
Party	Candidate	Votes	%
Independent	Joy Allison	388	34.80%
Independent	Arturo Pacheco Reyes	184	16.50%
Independent	Blank vote	540	48.43%
Independent	Over vote	3	0.27%
Total votes		1,115	100.00%

Neither of the candidates polled enough votes to meet Hawaii's strict criteria for independents to participate in the general election.

== General election ==
=== Predictions ===
Source	Ranking	As of
The Cook Political Report	Solid D	November 3, 2014
Sabato's Crystal Ball	Safe D	November 3, 2014
Rothenberg Political Report	Safe D	November 3, 2014
Real Clear Politics	Safe D	November 3, 2014

=== Polling ===
Poll source	Date(s) administered	Sample size	Margin of error	Brian Schatz (D)	Campbell Cavasso (R)	Other	Undecided
CBS News/NYT/YouGov	July 5–24, 2014	1,087	± 3%	58%	22%	15%	5%
CBS News/NYT/YouGov	August 18 – September 2, 2014	655	± 6%	62%	27%	0%	10%
Rasmussen Reports	September 9–10, 2014	750	± 4%	60%	28%	6%	7%
Civil Beat	September 11–14, 2014	1,055	± 3%	62%	25%	—	13%
CBS News/NYT/YouGov	September 20 – October 1, 2014	1,319	± 4%	78%	22%	0%	0%
Ward Research	October 11–18, 2014	605	± 4%	71%	20%	—	10%
Civil Beat	October 16–19, 2014	1,221	± 2.8%	55%	29%	—	16%
CBS News/NYT/YouGov	October 16–23, 2014	1,002	± 6%	70%	18%	1%	11%

=== Results ===
United States Senate special election in Hawaii, 2014
Party	Candidate	Votes	%	±%
Democratic	Brian Schatz (incumbent)	246,827	69.78%	−5.03%
Republican	Campbell Cavasso	98,006	27.70%	+6.13%
Libertarian	Michael Kokoski	8,941	2.52%	+1.72%
Total votes		353,774	100.00%	N/A
Democratic hold				

==== By county ====
By county

County	Brian Schatz Democratic		Campbell Cavasso Republican		All Others	
County	#	%	#	%	#	%
Hawaii	35,509	73.24%	11,093	22.88%	1,881	3.88%
Honolulu	163,411	68.15%	71,487	29.81%	4,889	2.04%
Kauaʻi	16,189	73.67%	5,250	23.89%	537	2.44%
Maui	31,668	72.86%	10,165	23.39%	1,634	3.76%
Totals	246,827	69.77%	98,006	27.7%	8,941	2.53%
