= Esther Kiaʻāina =

Hawaiian politician

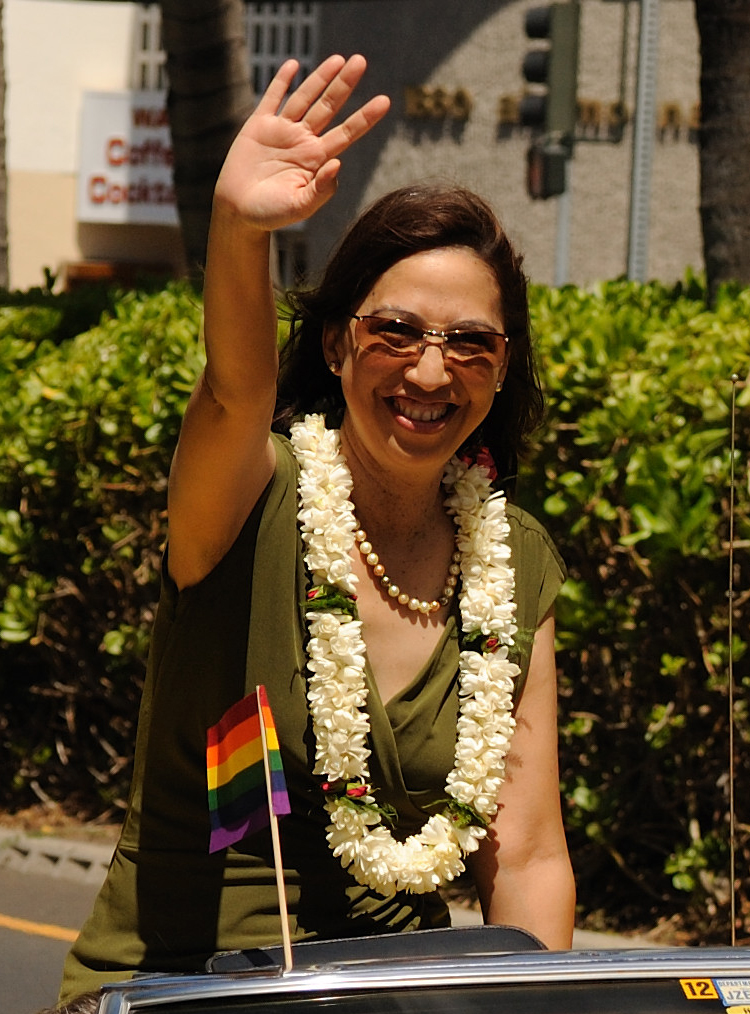
- Kia’āina in 2012

Member of the Honolulu City Council from the 3rd district
- Incumbent
- Assumed office January 2, 2021
- Preceded by: Ikaika Anderson

United States Assistant Secretary of the Interior for Insular Areas
- In office June 26, 2014 – March 13, 2017
- President: Barack Obama
- Preceded by: Anthony Babauta
- Succeeded by: Douglas Domenech

Personal details
- Born: July 16, 1963 (age 62) Guam, U.S.
- Party: Democratic
- Education: University of Southern California (BA); George Washington University (JD); Johns Hopkins University (MA)

Esther Puakela Kiaʻāina (born July 16, 1963) is a Native Hawaiian politician who currently serves as Floor Leader of the Honolulu City Council and represents the Windward side, or District 3, on the island of Oʻahu (Waimānalo, Kailua and Kāneʻohe).

Kiaʻāina was first elected as a Councilmember on November 3, 2020, and began her first term on January 2, 2021. She was re-elected on August 10, 2024 and continues her term until January 2, 2029. Kiaʻāina serves as Chair of the Committee on Zoning & Planning and Vice Chair of the Committee on Public Safety & Economy.

== Early life and education ==
Kiaʻāina is the daughter of parents Lorelei Haunani Anahu and Melvin Leialoha Kiaʻāina. She was born and raised on the island of Guam where her father served as a civilian in the U.S. Navy. She later returned to their homeland of Hawai‘i, where she graduated from the Kamehameha Schools.

Kiaʻāina received her B.A. from the University of Southern California in International Relations and Political Science, and her J.D. from the George Washington University Law School. She also attended Waseda University in Tokyo, Japan, and the Johns Hopkins University School of Advanced International Studies.

== Political career ==
After graduating from the University of Southern California in 1985, Kiaʻāina served as a volunteer-intern to Hawai‘i U.S. Senator Daniel Inouye in Washington, D.C. She also worked for Hawai‘i U.S. Senator Daniel Akaka as a Legislative Assistant during the 1990s, and as Chief of Staff/Legislative Director for U.S. Congressman Robert Underwood of Guam and U.S. Congressman Ed Case, who represented Hawai‘i's 2nd Congressional District.

In Hawai‘i, Kiaʻāina served as a Land Asset Manager for the Kamehameha Schools, Hawai‘i's largest landowner, for three years, before moving on in 2009 to work as Chief Advocate for the Office of Hawaiian Affairs.

In 2012, Kiaʻāina ran to represent Hawai‘i's 2nd Congressional District in the United States Congress, following the retirement of U.S. Congresswoman Mazie Hirono, who decided to run for the U.S. Senate. She was one of six candidates and placed third in the race.

On October 15, 2012, Neil Abercrombie, the Governor of Hawai‘i, appointed her as First Deputy to the Hawai'i Department of Land and Natural Resources.

Following the death of Senator Inouye, who had represented the State of Hawai‘i since its establishment in 1959, the Hawai‘i Democratic Party was given the ability to choose three possible replacements to recommend to Governor Abercrombie. On December 26, 2012, the party met and chose the three contenders: Kiaʻāina, Hawai‘i U.S. Congresswoman Colleen Hanabusa (Inouye's requested choice), and Lieutenant Governor of Hawaii Brian Schatz. To prevent a long vacancy during the United States fiscal cliff budget negotiations, Abercrombie made his decision quickly, per the request of U.S. Senate Majority Leader Harry Reid: Schatz was chosen to fill Inouye's seat until a special election in 2014.

Kiaʻāina was nominated by President Barack Obama as Assistant Secretary of the Interior for Insular Areas on September 11, 2013. She was confirmed by the U.S. Senate on June 26, 2014. In May 2016, Obama designated Kiaʻāina to also serve as his White House Representative for the 902 Consultations between the United States and the Commonwealth of the Northern Mariana Islands. She resigned March in 2017.

Kiaʻāina was first elected to the Honolulu City Council representing District 3 on November 3, 2020, defeating Greg Thielen with about 59.3% of the vote in the general election, and assumed office on January 2, 2021.

Kiaʻāina was re-elected to the Honolulu City Council in 2024, winning the primary election outright on August 10, 2024. She received approximately 58.2% of the vote against challengers David Kauahikaua (17.9%), Kelsey Nakanelua (17.8%), and Christopher Curren (6.0 %). As she secured a majority of votes in the primary, a general election contest was not held for District 3 on November 5, 2024. She was sworn in for her second term on January 2, 2025, and is serving until January 2, 2029.
