= Kids Off Social Media Act =

Proposed United States federal law

- Long title: To prohibit users who are under age 13 from accessing social media platforms, to prohibit the use of personalized recommendation systems on individuals under age 17, and limit the use of social media in schools.
- Acronyms (colloquial): KOSMA

Legislative history
- Introduced in the Senate as S. 278 by Brian Schatz (D‑HI) on January 28, 2025; Committee consideration by Senate Committee on Commerce, Science, and Transportation

The Kids Off Social Media Act (KOSMA) also known as S. 278 is a United States federal bill proposed by Brian Schatz that, if passed, would ban anyone aged under 13 from all social media platforms, ban algorithmic recommendation systems to those under 17, and ban social media in schools.

== Legislative history ==
The Kids Off Social Media Act was first introduced on April 30, 2024, as S. 4213, however it never advanced and died in committee. The bill was then reintroduced on January 28, 2025, and advanced out of the Senate Committee on Commerce, Science, and Transportation on February 5, 2025, with all senators on the committee being in favor of the bill except Ed Markey.

== Content of the bill ==
The Kids Off Social Media Act requires social media platforms to ban all minors under 13 years of age, regardless of whether they have parental consent or not, from their platform when the act takes effect. The minor under 13 can access the data from their terminated account within 90 days of it being terminated.

The bill also requires social media companies to ban all personalized feeds from minors under 17 years of age that are based on the user's device, language, location, age or the fact that the user is a minor. However social media platforms are allowed to give minors under 17 algorithmic feeds as long as they are in a chronological format.

The section of the bill that requires social media companies to prevent access by minors is enforced by the Federal Trade Commission and State Attorney Generals, however State Attorney Generals must notify the Federal Trade Commission that they plan on enforcing the law.

The bill also requires elementary and secondary schools to block access to social media. Those sections are enforced by the Federal Communications Commission.
