= Campbell Cavasso =

American politician

Cam Cavasso
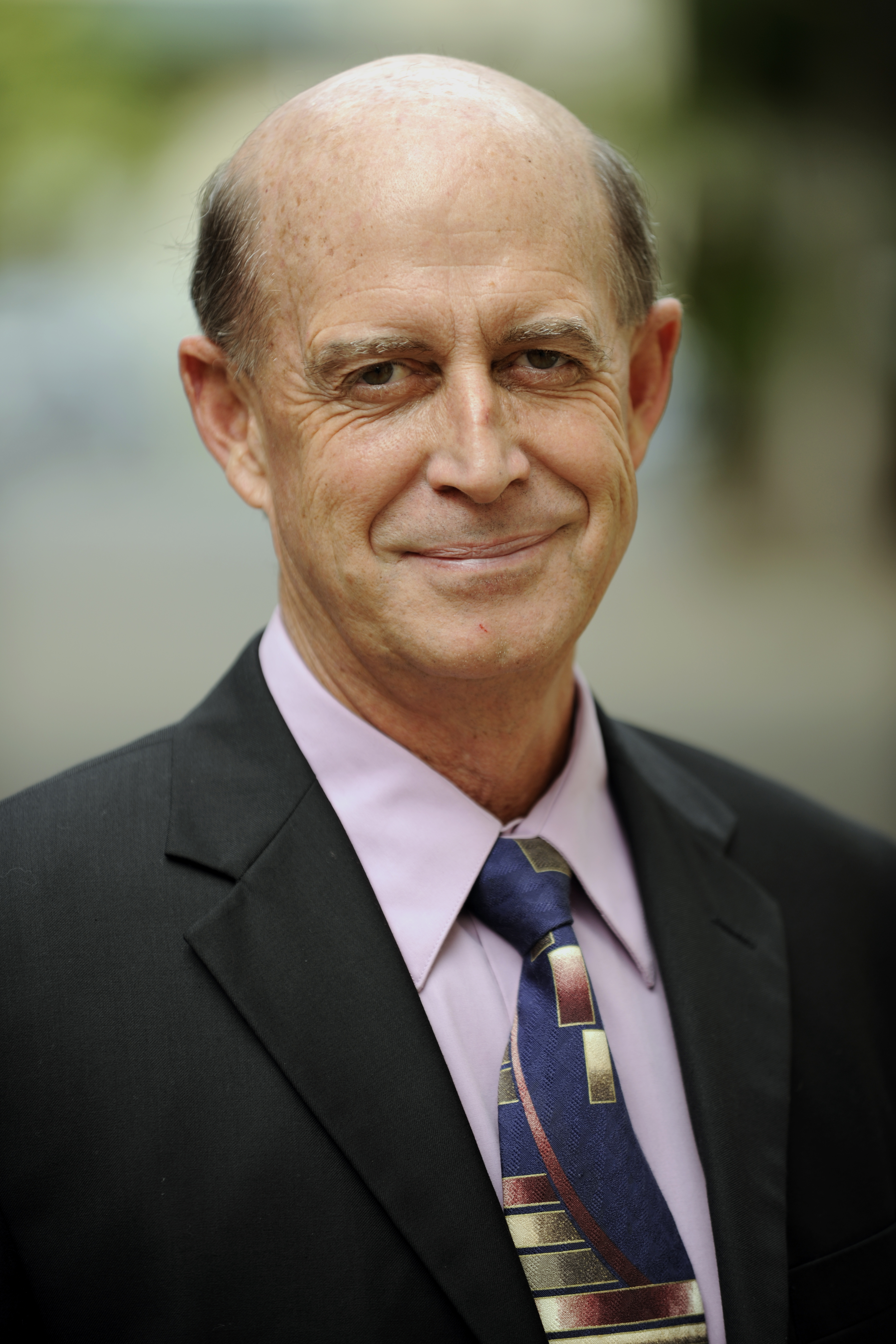

Member of the Hawaii House of Representatives from the 20th district
- In office January 1985 – January 1991
- Preceded by: Mazie Hirono
- Succeeded by: Jackie Young

Personal details
- Born: October 14, 1950 (age 75) San Francisco, California, U.S.
- Party: Republican
- Spouse: Tula Cavasso
- Children: 5
- Education: University of Colorado, Boulder (BA)
- Website: Official website

Military service
- Allegiance: United States
- Branch/service: United States Army
- Years of service: 1973-1978
- Rank: Captain

Campbell "Cam" Cavasso (born October 14, 1950), is an American politician, businessman and perennial candidate. A Republican, Cavasso served three terms in the Hawaii House of Representatives from 1985 to 1991, and would later run for both chambers of the United States Congress in 2004, 2010, 2014, and 2018.

Born in San Francisco, Cavasso moved with his family to Oahu at a young age. He graduated from University of Colorado Boulder after serving in ROTC, and also spent five years in the United States Army, rising to the rank of captain. Cavasso entered politics in the 1980s, first winning election to the state House of Representatives from District 20 (encompassing parts of Oahu) in 1984. He won re-election twice, and served until 1991. After leaving the state legislature, Cavasso worked as a financial advisor and entrepreneur. He made a bid for the Republican nomination for Lieutenant Governor in 2002, but he placed third in the primary with just under 14 percent of the vote.

Cavasso has run for the United States Senate three times and the United States House of Representatives once. In 2004, he challenged seven-term Democratic senator Daniel Inouye, securing the Republican nomination but losing the general election with 21 percent of the vote. He again challenged Inouye in 2010, and received approximately 22 percent. Following Inouye's death in 2012, a special election was called in 2014 to determine who would serve out the last two years of his term. Cavasso again won the Republican nomination, and faced appointed Senator and former lieutenant governor Brian Schatz. Cavasso received almost 28 percent of the vote, improving on both his vote total and vote percentage from his two previous runs, but still lost to Schatz by over 40 points. He was the Republican nominee for Hawaii's 1st congressional district in 2018, winning by over 60 points in the August primary. In the general election, he received 23 percent of the vote against Democratic congressman Ed Case, marking his fourth consecutive general election defeat.

Cavasso is regarded as a social and fiscal conservative, known for his opposition to abortion and same-sex marriage. During his congressional runs, Cavasso praised the leadership of Presidents George W. Bush and Donald Trump, and was critical of President Barack Obama's policies, in particular the Affordable Care Act. He also supports repealing regulations which he regards as burdensome to business, and made the high cost of living in Hawaii a key issue in multiple campaigns.

== Early life ==
Cavasso was born on October 14, 1950, in San Francisco, California, the eldest of three sons (Joseph and David younger brothers) of Leon Cavasso Jr., a coffee broker and salesman, and June Campbell Cavasso, a homemaker, secretary, and daughter of a New Jersey Christian minister and pastor, Charles Henry Campbell, and his wife Elsie Campbell. His paternal great–grandfather, Frank Davey, was a Hawaii adventurer and photographer who served the royalty in the Hawaiian Kingdom from 1896 to 1905. Davey's photographs include those of Princess Kaiulani on the steps of her home at Ainahou, Hawaii, and the “Lei Makers” in the early years of Honolulu.

Cavasso and his family relocated to Oahu, Hawaii, in October 1961, and he graduated from Kailua Elementary School, Kailua Intermediate School, and Kailua High School.

== Early adulthood ==
Awarded a four-year ROTC scholarship to attend the University of Colorado at Boulder, he earned a Bachelor of Arts degree in sociology in 1973. In his junior year, he spent two semesters as a foreign exchange student at Waseda University in Tokyo, Japan. Upon graduation from the University of Colorado, he served five years in the United States Army from 1973 to 1978, rising to the rank of captain.

Cavasso resides with Tula, his wife of 47–48 years, and four children and four grandchildren on a 6 1/2-acre turf farm in Waimanalo, Hawaii. He is a lay minister in his Christian church and had served as a Bible Study group teacher. He is also a longtime canoe paddler and steersman for a senior master crew, has paddled for Lanikai, Kailua, and Kai One, and has stated that paddling is “rewarding and fun.”

Cavasso is a financial advisor with the Mass Mutual Financial Group and the founder and co-owner of Hydroseed Hawaii, LLC, a small business contracting company specializing in hydromulching.

== Political career ==
=== Legislative tenure ===
In 1984, Cavasso was first elected to the Hawaii State House of Representatives, representing District 20, which included Waimanalo in Honolulu County. The district had previously been represented by Democrat (and future US Senator) Mazie Hirono, constituting a pickup for the GOP. Cavasso was re-elected to the seat in 1986 and 1988. While initially a candidate for re-election in 1990, he eventually decided not to run, and was succeeded by Democrat Jackie Young. FiveThirtyEight retrospectively remarked that it was through his time in the state legislature that Cavasso established his reputation as "a respectable politician" until his "legacy was overshadowed as he gained a reputation as a perennial loser".

=== 2002 lieutenant gubernatorial election ===
In 2002, he sought the Republican nomination for Lieutenant Governor of Hawaii. He finished third with 10,085 votes (13.88%), behind television news anchor Dalton Tanonaka, who took 27,142 votes (37.36%), and former Circuit Court judge Duke Aiona, who won the primary with 35,422 votes (48.76%). Aiona thus became the running mate of former Maui Mayor Linda Lingle; the ticket won with 51 percent of the vote in the November election.

=== 2004 U.S. Senate election ===
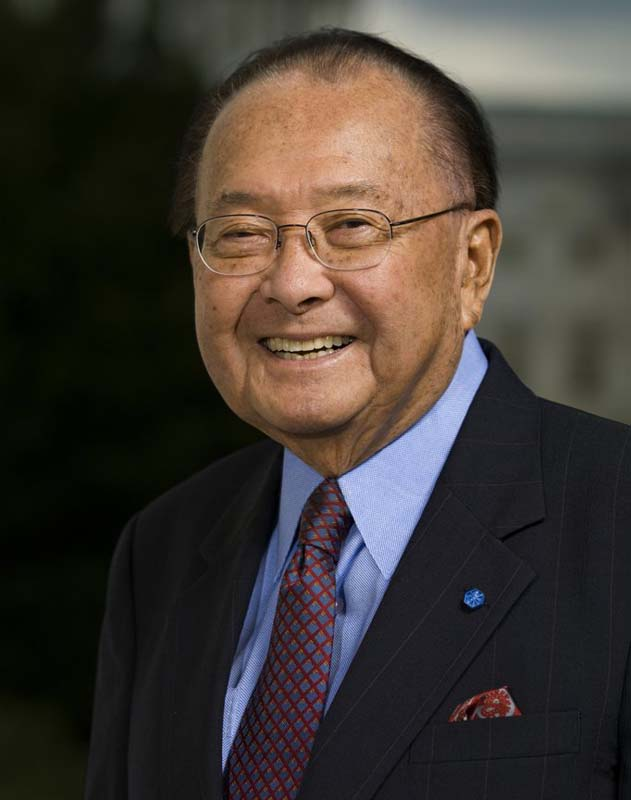
In 2004, Cavasso challenged seven-term Democratic Senator Daniel Inouye

In 2004, Cavasso ran for the Republican nomination to challenge eight-term Democratic senator Daniel Inouye. He stated that he decided to run in July 2004, following Inouye's vote against the Federal Marriage Amendment, which would ban gay marriage at the federal level. He prevailed in the Republican primary, winning 21,645 votes for 49.2 percent of all ballots cast, against three competitors. Inouye emerged from the Democratic primary with only token opposition, meaning that Inouye and Cavasso would face each other in the November election (as well as independent candidate Jim Brewer and Libertarian candidate Jeff Mallan). During the campaign, Cavasso contended that Inouye was too liberal for Hawaii, and that the Senator's positions on issues like abortion and gay marriage (both of which he supported) were "out of touch" with what Hawaiians wanted. He also argued that Inouye had made Hawaii too dependent on federal funding, and promised that if elected, he would seek to position the state as "a technology center and a bridge between Asia and the mainland". He also voiced support for Bush's tax cuts and invasion of Iraq, both of which Inouye opposed, and the United States PATRIOT Act, which Cavasso indicated in a questionnaire did not "go too far" in his view.

On Election Day, Inouye won 313,629 votes (75.51%) to Cavasso's 87,172 (20.99%). Exit polling by CNN found that Cavasso won a majority among Republicans and self-identified conservatives, as well as losing by only one point among those who strongly approved of Bush's job performance, while significantly trailing Inouye among most other demographics. Despite his loss, Cavasso speculated that he nonetheless impacted the balance of power in the Senate, by forcing Inouye to devote resources to his own campaign and therefore lessening his ability to help fellow Democrats, such as Senate Minority Leader Tom Daschle, who narrowly lost re-election the same year.

=== 2010 U.S. Senate election ===
Cavasso again ran for the U.S. Senate again in 2010, winning the Republican primary with 23,033 votes (66.94%) against two opponents. Cavasso was regarded as the underdog in the general election, including by the candidate himself; in one television spot to promote his campaign, he jokingly referred to himself as "crazy" for again taking on Inouye, who had served eight terms in the Senate and continued to be widely popular in the state. Cavasso had a severe fundraising deficit compared to Inouye, having raised $220,000 (much of it self-funded) to Inouye's $5.2 million. Inouye ultimately outraised Cavasso by a ratio of 25 to 1. Cavasso campaigned on a platform of fiscal restraint and limited government, criticizing Inouye for his support of the 2008 bailouts and of congressional earmarks and commenting that the nation's financial state was as "crazy" as his own underdog campaign. Polling found Cavasso trailing Inouye by a large margin, although one poll — conducted by Rasmussen Reports the month before the election — found him only thirteen points behind his Democratic opponent, regarded as a much closer-than-expected margin.

Cavasso ultimately received 79,939 votes, or 21.6 percent of all ballots cast; Inouye received over 277,000 votes, winning by over 53 percentage points. The poll which had indicated a significantly closer contest was later deemed by Fivethirtyeight the "worst poll" since at least 1998 in terms of disparity between polling data and election result. Cavasso later reported that Inouye had phoned him after the election to tell him that he had "enjoyed" Cavasso's campaign.

=== 2014 U.S. Senate election ===
In December 2012, Senator Daniel Inouye died. His ninth term was not filled out, so Hawaii governor Neil Abercrombie had to appoint a replacement until a special election could be held in 2014. Inouye's dying wish was that his successor be Representative Colleen Hanabusa; however, Abercrombie instead appointed lieutenant governor Brian Schatz to Inouye's seat, citing Hanabusa's seat on the House Armed Services Committee and "the overall best interest of the party" as his considerations. By October 2013, Cavasso had indicated that he planned to run for the seat, and he officially announced his candidacy in April 2014. Cavasso easily won the Republican nomination in the August primary, receiving over 72 percent of the vote and leading his nearest competitor, John P. Roco, by 60 percentage points. Schatz narrowly won the Democratic primary against Hanabusa, prevailing by under one percentage point and leading to speculation that Hurricane Iselle might have impacted the result.

This set up a general election matchup between Cavasso and Schatz, as well as Libertarian nominee Michael Kokoski, a social worker. Schatz was widely regarded as the presumptive victor, given the state's heavy Democratic lean as well as polls that showed him leading by between 25 and 50 percentage points. Bloomberg Businessweek included the race among its list of the "7 Least Competitive Races" of the cycle. However, Cavasso argued that he was in a better position to win the election than in his two prior campaigns, because Schatz had been appointed by an unpopular governor (Abercrombie lost the Democratic nomination for re-election in 2014 to an underfunded opponent, state legislator David Ige) and because Schatz's nomination had gone against Inouye's dying wish. During the general election, Cavasso stressed the issue of Hawaii's high cost of living and announced that he planned to fight for the repeal of regulations which he regarded as burdensome to businesses in the state; he named the high cost of living to be the biggest issue facing Hawaii. He also emphasized his socially conservative positions on issues such as gay marriage, marijuana legalization, and abortion. He created a series of short YouTube videos to increase name recognition and share his message with voters. Cavasso also called for a series of debates between himself and Schatz, although Schatz declined the invitations, leading Cavasso to at one point inquire, "Where is Schatz? Is he ill?"

In the general election, Schatz prevailed with 246,827 votes (69.78 percent) to Cavasso's 98,006 and Kokoski's 8,941. Despite his loss, Cavasso's vote total and vote share were both higher than in either of his previous Senate campaigns. In an Associated Press interview following the result, Cavasso said that he hoped that Schatz would work with the Republican majority in the Senate on issues impacting Hawaiians, such as defense and trade. He also expressed hope that voters would continue to consider the "family and conservative values I have spoken for in this election".

=== 2018 U.S. House election ===
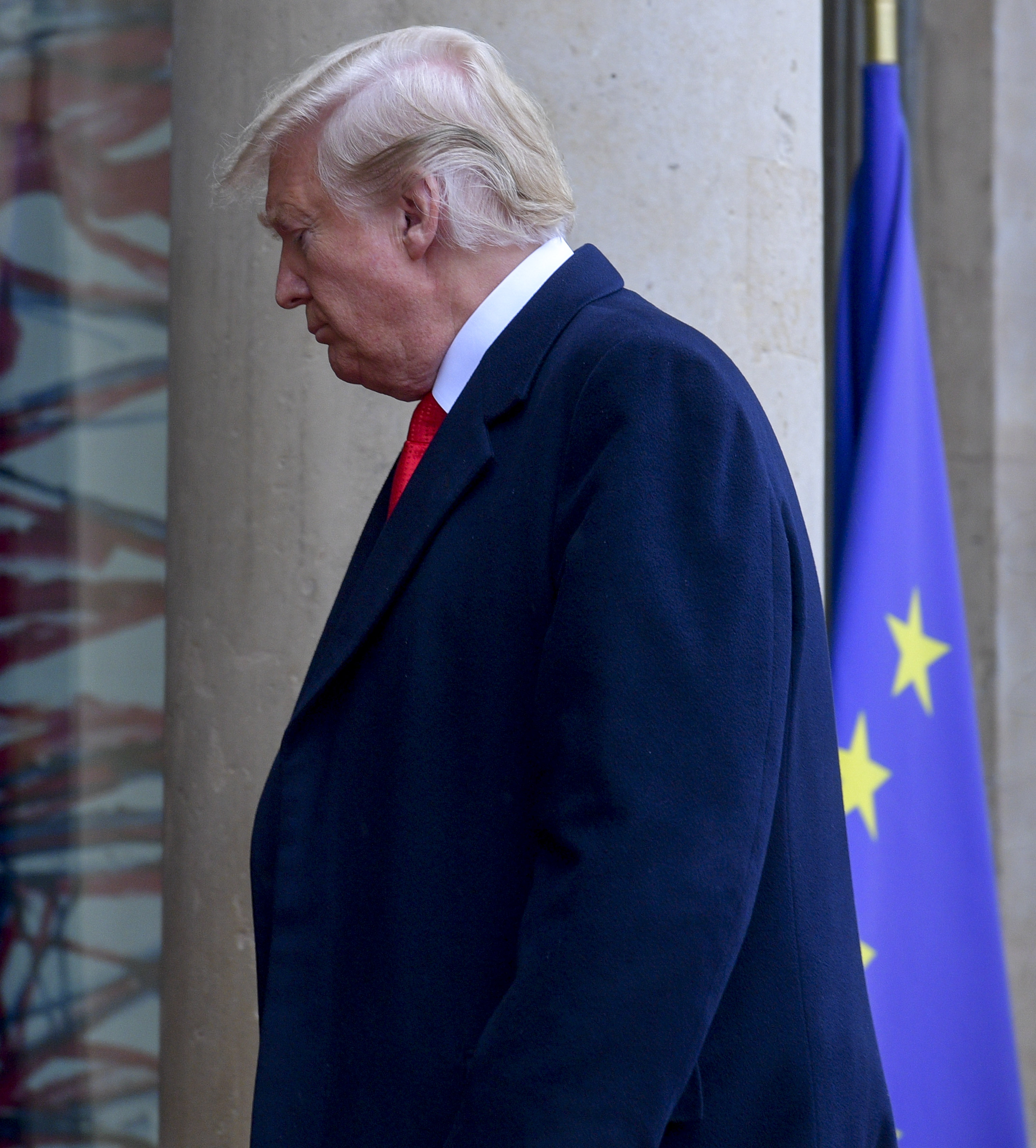
During his 2018 bid for the House of Representatives, Cavasso spoke favorably of President Donald Trump's tenure

On January 8, 2018, Hanabusa formally announced her candidacy for governor in the 2018 Hawaii gubernatorial election, challenging incumbent governor Ige in the Democratic primary. This created an open seat in Hawaii's 1st congressional district for the 2018 election. Cavasso announced his candidacy for the seat, and ran in the Republican primary against businessman and anti-abortion activist Raymond Vinole. In the August 11 primary, Cavasso prevailed with 10,564 votes, about 82 percent of all ballots cast.

In the general election, Cavasso faced Democratic nominee (and former congressman) Ed Case, Libertarian candidate Michelle Tippens, Green candidate Zach Burd, and nonpartisan candidate Calvin Griffin. Cavasso's campaign focused on technology-based campaign methods, including social media; Cavasso remarked that the campaign was the most relaxing and fun he'd worked on. Cavasso told KHON that his objective was to form a winning coalition of Republicans, independents, and conservative Democrats. In an interview with Hawaii News Now, he remarked that "there is a sense we got this one" (election) and that he believed Hawaiians wanted a stronger Republican Party. During the campaign, Cavasso praised President Donald Trump's leadership, particularly in relation to his diplomacy with North Korea and his handling of the economy, and was critical of Hawaii Democrats's behavior during the Brett Kavanaugh hearings. He also voiced skepticism of man-made climate change and expressed worry that further environmental regulations could increase gasoline prices and hurt Hawaii. He stated that, if elected, he would support Representative Jim Jordan of Ohio for Speaker of the House. Cavasso noted that Republicans currently held the White House, the House of Representatives, and the Senate, and argued that it would benefit Hawaii to have a member of Congress belonging to the majority party.

On October 10, 2018, KITV hosted a debate between the two major-party candidates, focusing on congressional handling of the sexual assault allegations against Supreme Court nominee Brett Kavanaugh. The two candidates also both attended a forum hosted by the Grassroots Institute of Hawaii at the Pacific Club, where Cavasso criticized Senator Hirono for her handling of the Kavanaugh allegations, calling her "entirely out of order" for telling men to "shut up and step up" on issues of sexual assault. Cavasso reiterated his opposition to the legalization of marijuana, arguing that the opioid epidemic demonstrated that legalization would be counterproductive. He criticized the Affordable Care Act as leading to higher health care costs, and said he would not support Native Hawaiian sovereignty, arguing that they would not be well served by it and quoting a Hawaiian king as saying "we are all of one blood". On Election Day, Cavasso received 42,498 votes, just over 23 percent of all ballots cast, coming in second place behind Case.

== Political positions ==
Cavasso supports socially conservative political positions. He has been a consistent critic of the legalization of same-sex marriage, stating that Inouye's opposition to the Federal Marriage Amendment was what motivated him to challenge the Senator in 2004. He was also supportive of Hawaii's Traditional Marriage Amendment, which granted the state legislature the power to restrict marriage to opposite-sex couples; the amendment passed in 1998 with 69 percent of voters in favor. At a 2018 candidate forum, Cavasso expressed his opposition to marijuana legalization, responding that "it's taking a chance" and opining that marijuana use can lead to other drugs. He elaborated at the forum: "we have enough problems right now with the opiate epidemic. We have troubles in our nation with drugs. I would under no circumstances encourage the legalization of drugs or the legalization of marijuana". He also argued in favor of ending Pono Choices, a sex education program in Hawaiian public schools.

He self-identifies as a "constitutional and fiscal conservative", and has also stated that he believes that "individuals, not government, are best at solving problems and creating opportunities." Cavasso has called for Hawaii's shipping industry to be deregulated, on the grounds that the regulations increase the cost of living. He also supports repealing or revising the Jones Act, which regulates international commerce and stipulates that 75 percent of all crew members on shipping vessels must be American, arguing that it contributes to a higher cost of living in the state. He has suggested that, if the law remains in place, Hawaii should receive an exemption. Cavasso has also been critical of redistributive economic programs, calling them "stealing" and arguing that they disincentivize hard work. He is an opponent of the Affordable Care Act; he suggests that it has impaired competition and that doctors should be permitted to design a health care system.

On climate change, Cavasso has claimed that "The science […] is not settled" and voiced concern that environmental regulations could hurt Hawaii's economy. He supports the use of solar power and technological innovation as ways to cut carbon emissions. During his 2014 campaign, he also criticized Schatz for deeming climate change to be the biggest issue facing America, calling the claim "not merely overstating the case", but "environmental hysteria". He likened climate change activism to the reaction to the 1968 book The Population Bomb, which warned that widespread starvation would soon result from an overpopulated earth.

In a 2004 candidate questionnaire, Cavasso called himself "undecided" on the Akaka Bill to grant federal recognition to Native Hawaiians. During his 2018 run for the House of Representatives, Cavasso was critical of proposals for the creation of a Hawaiian nation; he argued that it would be inappropriate for them to receive federal recognition similar to that received by Native Americans, and positing that doing so would be divisive and create a "race-based nation".

== Electoral history ==
=== 2002 ===
2002 Hawaii Lieutenant Governor Republican Primary
Party	Candidate	Votes	%
Republican	James R. ("Duke") Aiona	35,422	48.8
Republican	Dalton Tanonaka	27,142	37.4
Republican	Cam Cavasso	10,085	13.9
Total votes		72,649	100.0

=== 2004 ===
2004 United States Senate Republican primary in Hawaii
Party	Candidate	Votes	%
Republican	Cam Cavasso	21,645	49.2
Republican	Rich Paine	9,630	21.9
Republican	Jay Friedheim	7,028	16.0
Republican	James R. DeLuze	5,653	12.9
Total votes		43,956	100.0

2004 United States Senate election in Hawaii
Party	Candidate	Votes	%	±%
Democratic	Daniel K. Inouye (incumbent)	313,629	75.5	−3.7%
Republican	Cam Cavasso	87,172	21.0	+3.2%
Independent	Jim Brewer	9,269	2.2	N/A
Libertarian	Jeff Mallan	5,277	1.3	−1.7%
Total votes		415,347	100.0	N/A
Democratic hold				

=== 2010 ===
2010 United States Senate Republican primary in Hawaii
Party	Candidate	Votes	%
Republican	Campbell Cavasso	23,033	66.9
Republican	John Roco	7,482	21.8
Republican	Eddie Pirkowski	3,891	11.3
Total votes		34,406	100.0%

2010 United States Senate election in Hawaii
Party	Candidate	Votes	%	±%
Democratic	Daniel Inouye (incumbent)	277,228	74.81%	−0.70%
Republican	Campbell Cavasso	79,939	21.57%	+0.58%
Green	Jim Brewer	7,762	2.09%	N/A
Libertarian	Lloyd Jeffrey Mallen	2,957	0.80%	−0.47%
Independent	Jeff Jarrett	2,697	0.73%	N/A
Total votes		370,583	100.00%	
Democratic hold				

=== 2014 ===
2014 United States Senate Republican primary in Hawaii (Special Election)
Party	Candidate	Votes	%
Republican	Campbell Cavasso	25,874	72.3
Republican	John P. Roco	4,425	12.4
Republican	Harry J. Friel, Jr.	3,477	9.7
Republican	Eddie Pirkowski	2,033	5.7
Total votes		35,809	100.00%

2014 United States Senate special election in Hawaii
Party	Candidate	Votes	%	±%
Democratic	Brian Schatz (incumbent)	246,827	69.78%	−5.03%
Republican	Campbell Cavasso	98,006	27.70%	+6.13%
Libertarian	Michael Kokoski	8,941	2.52%	+1.72%
Total votes		353,774	100.00%	N/A
Democratic hold				

=== 2018 ===
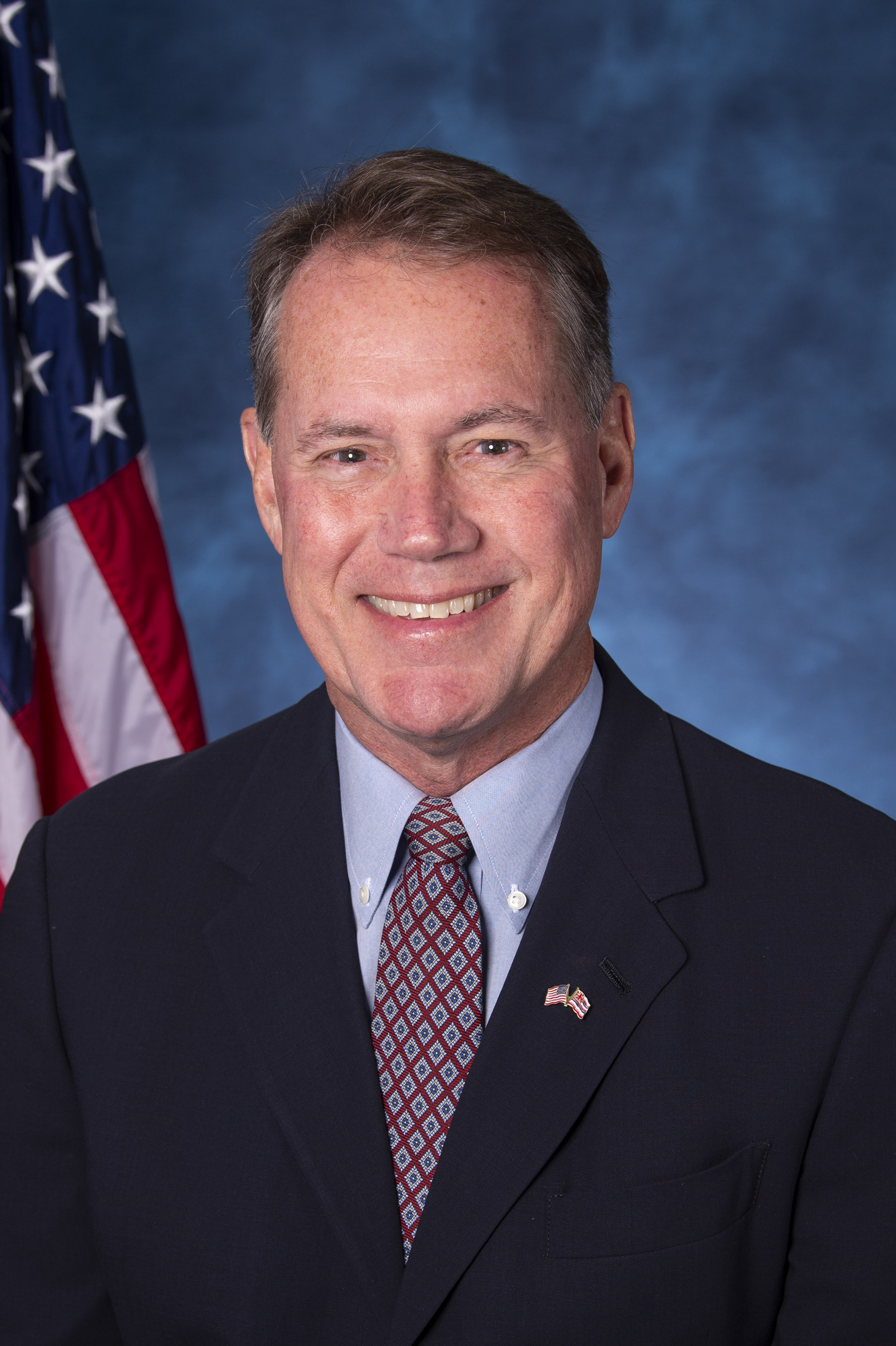
Ed Case, the Democratic nominee for Hawaii's first congressional district in 2018

2018 Hawaii's 1st congressional district Republican Primary
Party	Candidate	Votes	%
Republican	Campbell Cavasso	10,564	81.9
Republican	Raymond Vinole	2,342	18.1
Total votes		12,906	100.0

2018 Hawaii's 1st congressional district election
Party	Candidate	Votes	%	±%
Democratic	Ed Case	134,650	73.1	+1.2%
Republican	Campbell Cavasso	42,498	23.1	+0.4%
Libertarian	Michelle Tippens	3,498	1.9	−1.4%
Green	Zach Burd	2,214	1.2	N/A
Nonpartisan	Calvin Griffin	1,351	0.7	−1.4%
Total votes		184,211	100.0	N/A
Democratic hold				

== See also ==
- Hawaii Republican Party
- John Carroll (Hawaii politician)
- Perennial candidates in the United States

Party political offices
Preceded by Crystal Young	Republican nominee for U.S. Senator from Hawaii (Class 3); 2004, 2010, 2014	Succeeded by John Carroll
