= Brian Schatz =

American politician (born 1972)

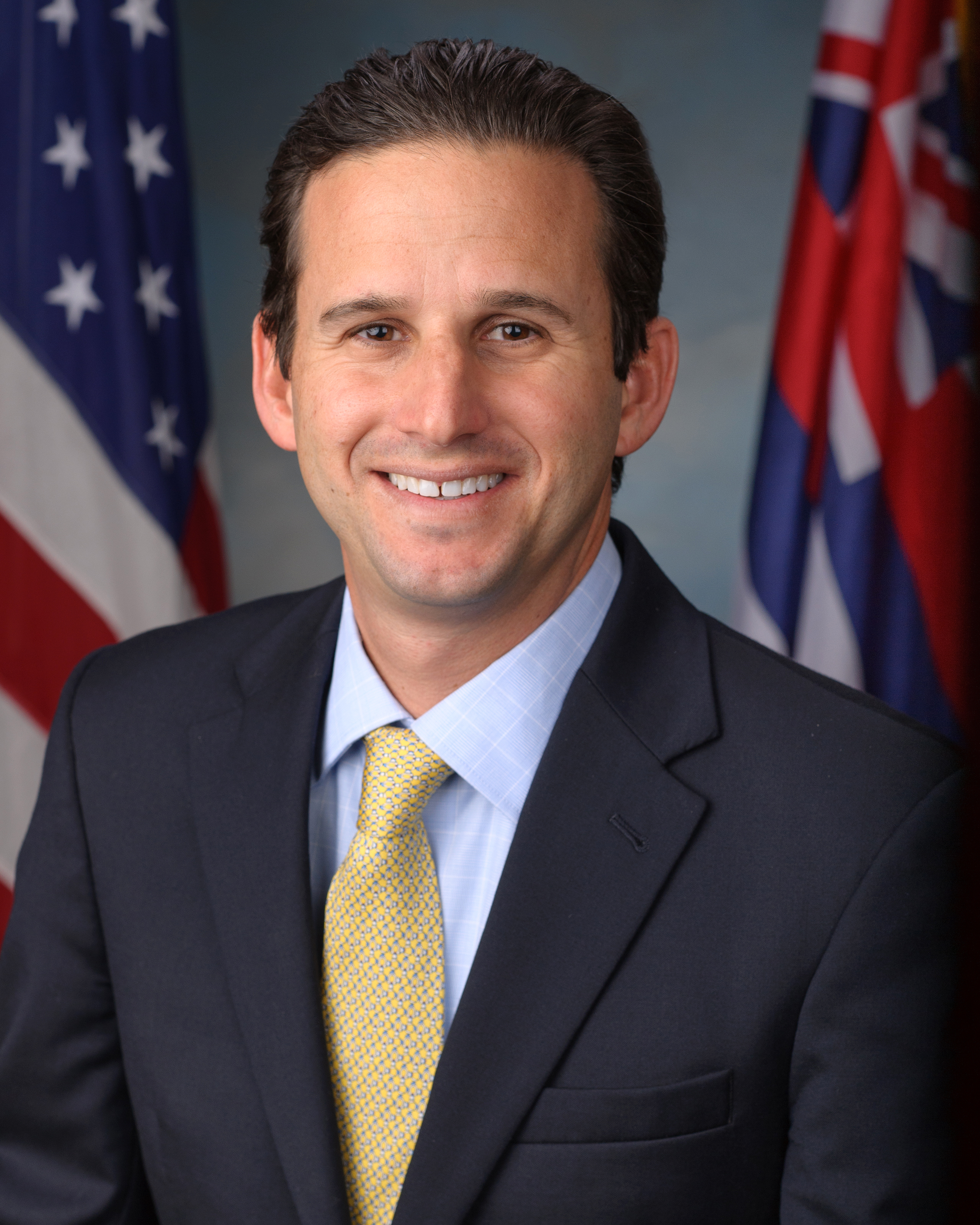
- Official portrait, 2013

United States Senator from Hawaii
- Incumbent
- Assumed office December 26, 2012 Serving with Mazie Hirono
- Preceded by: Daniel Inouye
Senate positions
Deputy Secretary of the Senate Democratic Caucus
Incumbent
Assumed office January 3, 2023 Serving with Chris Murphy (2025–present)
Leader	Chuck Schumer
Preceded by	Position established
Vice Chair of the Senate Indian Affairs Committee
Incumbent
Assumed office January 3, 2025
Preceded by	Lisa Murkowski
Chair of the Senate Indian Affairs Committee
In office February 3, 2021 – January 3, 2025
Preceded by	John Hoeven
Succeeded by	Lisa Murkowski

12th Lieutenant Governor of Hawaii
- In office December 6, 2010 – December 26, 2012
- Governor: Neil Abercrombie
- Preceded by: Duke Aiona
- Succeeded by: Shan Tsutsui

Chair of the Hawaii Democratic Party
- In office May 2008 – January 2010
- Preceded by: Jeani Withington
- Succeeded by: Dante Carpenter

Member of the Hawaii House of Representatives
- In office November 3, 1998 – November 7, 2006
- Preceded by: Sam Aiona
- Succeeded by: Della Au Belatti
- Constituency: 24th district (1998–2002); 25th district (2002–2006)

Personal details
- Born: Brian Emanuel Schatz; October 20, 1972 (age 54) Ann Arbor, Michigan, U.S.
- Party: Democratic
- Other political affiliations: Green (formerly)
- Spouse: Linda Kwok Kai Yun
- Children: 2
- Education: Pomona College (BA)
- Website: Senate website Campaign website
- Schatz's voice Schatz on benefits for Native Americans in the Infrastructure Investment and Jobs Act and the 2022 budget reconciliation bill Recorded August 9, 2021

Brian Emanuel Schatz (/ʃɑːts/ SHAHTS; born October 20, 1972) is an American politician serving since 2012 as the senior United States senator from Hawaii. A progressive Democrat, Schatz served in the Hawaii House of Representatives from 1998 to 2006, representing the 25th legislative district; as the chairman of the Democratic Party of Hawaii from 2008 to 2010; and as the 12th lieutenant governor of Hawaii from 2010 to 2012.

Schatz also worked as chief executive officer of Helping Hands Hawaii, an Oahu nonprofit social service agency, until he resigned to run for lieutenant governor of Hawaii in the 2010 gubernatorial election as Neil Abercrombie's running mate. He served as lieutenant governor until December 26, 2012, when Abercrombie appointed him to serve the rest of Daniel Inouye's U.S. Senate term after Inouye's death. Schatz was the youngest U.S. senator in the 112th Congress. He won the 2014 special election to complete the remainder of Inouye's Senate term with just under 70% of the vote, and was reelected in 2016 and in 2022.

== Early life ==
Brian Schatz was born into a Jewish American family in Ann Arbor, Michigan, along with an identical twin brother, Steve. He is the son of Barbara Jane (née Binder) and Irwin Jacob Schatz, a cardiologist and native of the Saint Boniface neighborhood of Winnipeg, Manitoba.

Schatz's father was the first to complain about the ethics of the Tuskegee syphilis experiment, in a 1965 letter. The letter was ignored until the problem finally came to public attention in 1972. Irwin Schatz wrote that he was "astounded" that "physicians allow patients with potentially fatal disease to remain untreated when effective therapy is available." Brian Schatz said that his father didn't talk about the letter, but that it influenced him to pursue the public good.

When Schatz and his brother were two years old, the family moved to Hawaii, where Schatz graduated from Punahou School. Schatz enrolled at Pomona College in Claremont, California; he spent a term studying abroad in Kenya on a program of the School for International Training (SIT). He graduated in 1994 with a Bachelor of Arts in philosophy.

== Early career ==
After college, Schatz returned to Hawaii, where he taught at Punahou before taking other jobs in the nonprofit sector. He was briefly a member of the Green Party.

Schatz had become active in the community as a teenager through his involvement in Youth for Environmental Services. He then served as CEO of Helping Hands Hawaii and director of the Makiki Community Library and of the Center for a Sustainable Future. In March 2010, Schatz stepped down from Helping Hands to run for lieutenant governor. He was a member of the 2007 class of the Pacific Century Fellows.

== Early political career ==
=== Hawaii House of Representatives (1998–2006) ===
In 1998, Schatz challenged the incumbent State Representative of the 24th district of the Hawaii House of Representatives, Republican Sam Aiona, and won, 53%–47%. In the 2000 rematch he was reelected, 57%–43%.

In 2002 he ran in the newly redrawn 25th House district, and defeated Republican Bill Hols, 69%–31%. In 2004 he defeated Republican Tracy Okubo, 64%–36%. The 25th district includes Makiki and Tantalus on Oahu.

=== 2006 congressional campaign ===
Schatz ran for Hawaii's 2nd congressional district, vacated by Ed Case, who had decided to run for the U.S. Senate against incumbent Daniel Akaka. The Democratic primary featured 10 candidates, seven of whom served in the Hawaii Legislature. Mazie Hirono, the lieutenant governor, was the only one who had held statewide office and thus enjoyed the most name recognition. She also raised the most money, mostly because of the endorsement of EMILY's List, and lent her own campaign $100,000. She won the primary with 22% of the vote, just 845 votes ahead of State Senator Colleen Hanabusa. Schatz finished sixth with 7% of the vote, behind Hirono and four state senators.

=== Obama campaign ===
One of the earliest supporters of Barack Obama for president, Schatz founded a group with other Hawaii Democrats in December 2006 to urge Obama to run, saying, "For the last six years we've been governed by fear, fear of terrorists, fear of other countries, even fear of the other party...everyone is governing by fear and Barack Obama changes all of that. He wants to govern the United States by hope." In 2008, Schatz worked as spokesman for Obama's campaign in Hawaii.

=== Chair of State Democratic Party (2008–2010) ===
In April 2008, Schatz began running for chair of the Democratic Party of Hawaii, and won the job at the state convention in March. During his tenure, the number of active party members increased and Obama had his best performance of any state in the country, winning 72% of the vote; just 54% of the state voted for Democratic nominee John Kerry in 2004. Schatz stepped down as party chair on January 9, 2010.

In a statement released after the death of Marilyn Bornhorst, Democratic Party of Hawaii chair from 1996 to 1998, Schatz acknowledged her as a mentor and the reason he joined the Democratic Party.

== Lieutenant Governor (2010–2012) ==
=== 2010 election ===
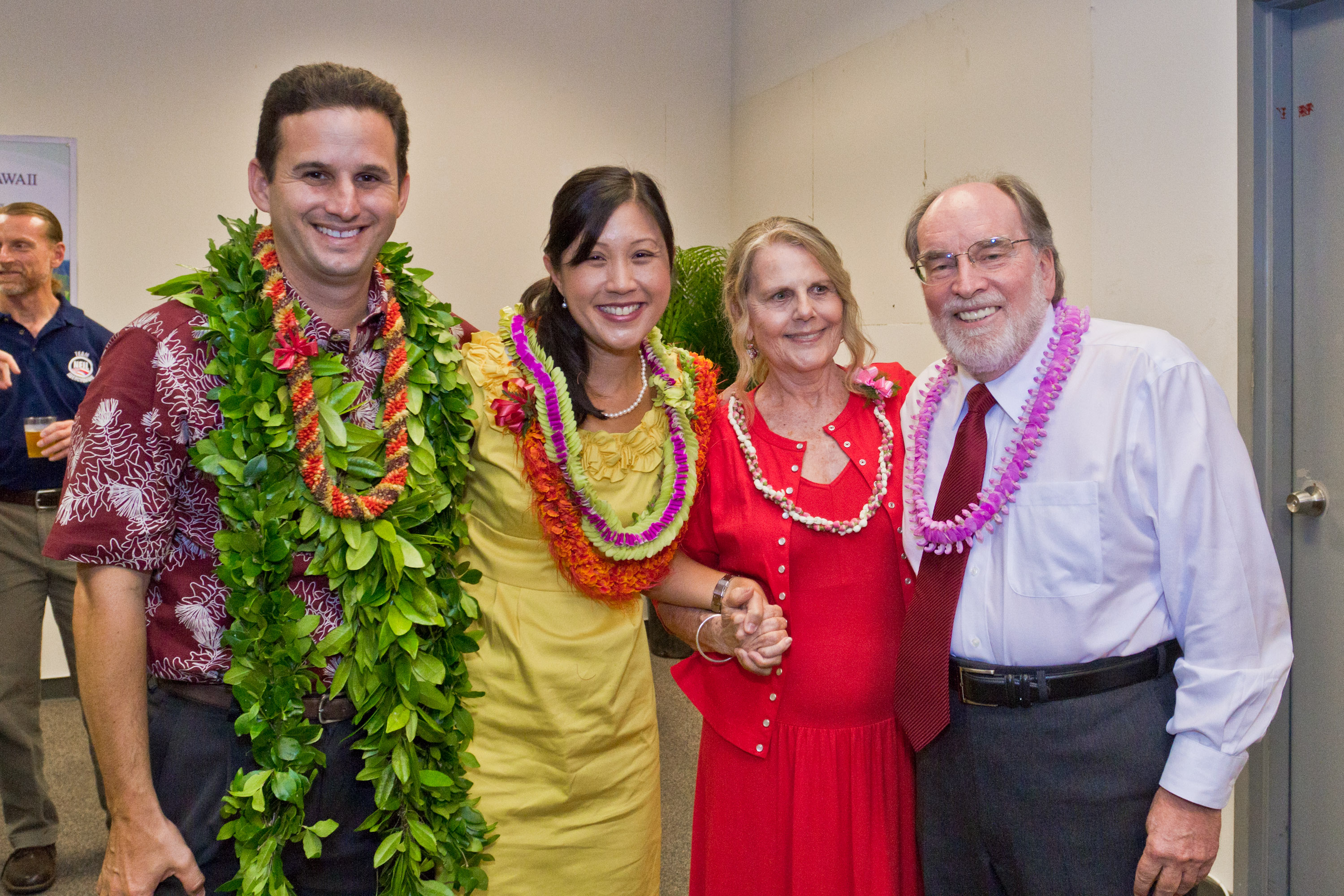
Schatz, his wife, Linda Kwok Kai Yun Schatz; incoming Hawaii First Lady Nancie Caraway; and Governor-elect Neil Abercrombie on Election Day 2010.

On January 10, 2010, Schatz announced his candidacy for lieutenant governor of Hawaii. His campaign priorities included the creation of clean-energy jobs, public education, and technological improvements in the public sector. He also declared his support for Hawaii House Bill 444, which would have allowed same-sex civil unions in Hawaii but was vetoed by Republican Governor Linda Lingle. A number of Hawaii labor unions endorsed Schatz for lieutenant governor in the Democratic primary, held on September 18, 2010. Schatz won the nomination with 34.8% of the vote, and thus became Neil Abercrombie's running mate in the November general election. In November 2010, the Abercrombie-Schatz ticket defeated the Republican ticket of Duke Aiona and Lynn Finnegan.

=== Tenure ===
On December 6, 2010, Schatz was inaugurated as Hawaii's 11th lieutenant governor alongside Abercrombie.

== U.S. Senate (2012–present) ==
=== Appointment ===
Shortly before Senator Daniel Inouye died on December 17, 2012, he dictated a letter to Governor Neil Abercrombie asking that U.S. Representative Colleen Hanabusa be appointed to finish his term.

Hawaii law on interim appointments to the U.S. Senate requires the governor to choose from three candidates selected by the party of the previous officeholder. On December 26, 2012, the Hawaii Democratic Party nominated Schatz, Hanabusa, and deputy director of the Hawaii Department of Land and Natural Resources Esther Kia'aina. The same day, Abercrombie appointed Schatz, despite Inouye's request. Later that night, Schatz accompanied President Barack Obama back to Washington, D.C. on Air Force One. On December 27, Schatz was sworn in as a senator by Vice President Joe Biden. He became only the sixth person to represent Hawaii in the U.S. Senate, and only the second who was not Asian American, after Oren E. Long.

=== Elections ===
==== 2014 ====
Schatz announced his intention to run for election in the special election to be held in 2014 for the balance of Inouye's ninth term. In April 2013 Hanabusa announced she would challenge Schatz in the primary. The core of the Schatz campaign was climate change and renewable energy. Schatz defeated Hanabusa by 1,782 votes (0.75%) in a primary delayed in two precincts by Hurricane Iselle.

As expected in heavily Democratic Hawaii, Schatz went on to win the general election, defeating Republican Campbell Cavasso with about 70% of the vote.

==== 2016 ====
In 2016, Schatz ran for and easily won his first full six-year Senate term against only nominal opposition.

According to New York magazine, Schatz had a low-profile but highly influential effect on the Democratic primary for the 2020 presidential election by pushing fellow Democrats to commit to progressive positions on issues such as healthcare, climate, college affordability and Social Security.

==== 2022 ====
Schatz announced he intended to run for reelection for a second full term. He was challenged by Republican state representative Bob McDermott. Schatz won overwhelmingly, earning 69.4% of the total vote.

=== Tenure ===
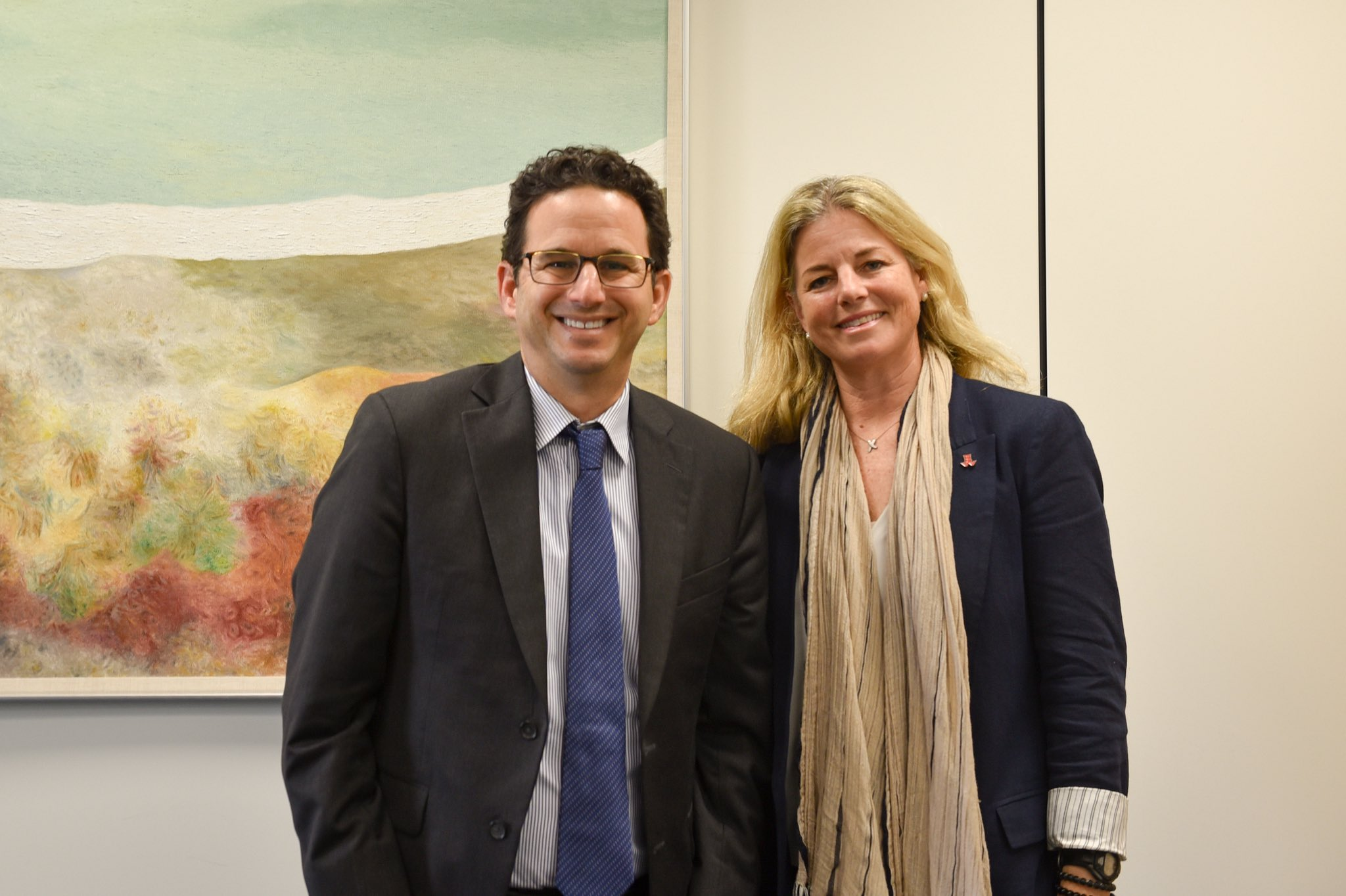
Schatz in 2025

During his time in the Senate, Schatz has developed a reputation as a liberal Democrat. He tends to vote with his party on both policy and procedural issues most of the time. GovTrack ranks Schatz as a more moderate member of his caucus. Schatz has been a part of numerous pieces of bipartisan legislation. He has co-sponsored 48 bills that have become law, including the bipartisan Veterans' Compensation Cost-of-Living Adjustment Act of 2021 and the John D. Dingell Jr. Conservation, Management, and Recreation Act. He has been the primary sponsor for seven bills, including the Native American Veterans' Memorial Amendments Act of 2013 and the NIST Small Business Cybersecurity Act. His primary areas of focus include healthcare, education, government operations, and national security. Schatz was instrumental in increasing the minimum smoking age to 21 and securing paid family leave for federal workers. He has also led efforts to expand telehealth services.

Schatz has also brought a large amount of federal funding to Hawaii. He secured reservation funding and transportation funding.

In April 2023, Morning Consult reported that Schatz was the "most popular" senator in the country, averaging an approval rating of 65% and a disapproval rating of 24%.

Schatz was participating in the certification of the 2021 United States Electoral College vote count when Trump supporters stormed the United States Capitol. He called the storming "despicable". Schatz called for Trump's removal from office through both the invocation of the 25th Amendment to the U.S. Constitution and the impeachment process. He called Trump a "danger to democracy itself". Schatz twice voted to convict Trump. He also criticized Senators Josh Hawley and Ted Cruz for voting against the certification of the 2021 United States Electoral College vote count during a floor speech a year later.

Schatz also gained attention for sparring with Hawley over various Biden nominees. In April 2022, Hawley objected to the confirmation of Christopher Lowman, prompting a fiery response from Schatz on the floor that cited Hawley's previous vote against Ukraine aid and his vote to exonerate Trump for extorting Ukrainian president Volodymyr Zelenskyy. In December 2022, Hawley objected to Schatz's attempt to confirm Russell Rumbaugh. The Senate confirmed both Lowman and Rumbaugh.

During the second of the 2026 United States federal government shutdowns, Schatz objected to unanimous consent for S. Res. 526, a resolution introduced by Senator John Kennedy to withhold senators' pay during a shutdown. The objection occurred during a Sunday Senate session during the shutdown. Schatz subsequently left the chamber, which prompted Kennedy to later criticize Democrats on social media, saying that they had blocked the resolution "without explaining why".

In August 2025, The Hill reported that Schatz had won enough support among his colleagues, including Leader Chuck Schumer, to succeed Dick Durbin as Democratic Whip. He was serving as Chief Deputy Whip at the time of his bid. Schatz is expected to assume the position upon the opening of the 120th United States Congress in January 2027.

=== 119th Congress committee assignments ===
- Committee on Appropriations
- Committee on Commerce, Science, and Transportation
- Committee on Foreign Relations
- Committee on Indian Affairs (vice chairman)
- Select Committee on Ethics

=== Leadership positions ===
- Deputy Secretary, Senate Democratic Caucus
- Chief Deputy Whip
- Co-chair, Senate Climate Change Task Force
- Chair, Senate Democratic Special Committee on the Climate Crisis
- Member, Board of Trustees for the Harry S. Truman Scholarship foundation

=== Caucus memberships ===
- Congressional Asian Pacific American Caucus
- Congressional NextGen 9-1-1 Caucus
- Expand Social Security Caucus

== Political positions ==
In 2018, New York magazine called Schatz a progressive but not a "bomb thrower" like Bernie Sanders. It characterized him as a low-profile but highly influential senator in pushing fellow Democrats to adopt progressive policy positions in the 2020 Democratic Party presidential primaries. In November 2025, Puck called Schatz "a leader of the party's progressive wing" who might be opposed by moderate Democrats if he runs to succeed Chuck Schumer as the Senate Democratic leader as his selection would run "counter to the tradition of Senate leaders who care more about winning than ideology".

=== Abortion ===
Schatz is pro-choice. He supports access to legal abortion without restrictions.

=== Budget and economy ===
Schatz supports income tax increases to balance the budget and federal spending to support economic growth.

=== LGBTQ+ rights ===
Schatz supports same-sex marriage. He sponsored legislation in 2015 to allow married gay couples to have equal access to the veterans benefits and Social Security they have earned. Schatz supports LGBTQIA+ rights. He received a 100% rating from the Human Rights Campaign. Schatz supports transgender rights.

=== Drugs ===
Schatz stopped short of calling for the legalization of marijuana in Hawaii in 2014, and has called for the criminalization of date-rape drugs. In 2016, he advocated for immunity for banks offering services to marijuana businesses.

=== Economy ===
To encourage tourism in West Hawaii, Schatz proposed that customs begin in Japan so that planes can arrive in West Hawaii as domestic flights.

=== Environment ===
In March 2014, Schatz was a lead organizer of an overnight talkathon devoted to discussing climate change. The gathering of over two dozen Senate Democrats took place on the Senate floor. The League of Conservation Voters supported the talkathon and ran campaign ads on Schatz's behalf.

In 2019, Schatz voiced his support for both a Green New Deal and a carbon tax as means to reduce emissions, saying that the two proposals are "perfectly compatible" with each other.

Schatz believes that climate change is a threat and has supported clean energy initiatives. In 2013, he wrote an op-ed promoting subsidies for wind turbines. He has advocated for 50% clean and carbon-free electricity by 2030. He opposed the Keystone Pipeline.

Along with Martin Heinrich and Sheldon Whitehouse, Schatz is one of the "Three Climateers" of the Senate, driving and negotiating legislation to address climate change, culminating in the Inflation Reduction Act of 2022.

Schatz was a member of the Senate Democrats' Special Committee on the Climate Crisis, which published a report of its findings in August 2020.

Schatz has remained active on climate change and clean energy in 2026. In recent legislative sessions, his focus has expanded from general clean energy growth to targeted areas such as research on short-lived pollutants, marine carbon capture, and institutional climate risk management. He co-introduced the Tropospheric Ozone Research Act of 2026, which targets tropospheric ozone—a potent greenhouse gas and short-lived climate pollutant. He continues to push for disaster preparedness and climate-smart development, backing the Federal Flood Risk Management Act to ensure federally funded infrastructure can withstand severe storms and flooding.

=== Foreign policy ===
Schatz criticized China's island-building activities, saying that "China's outsized claim to the entire South China Sea has no basis in international law."

In October 2017, Schatz condemned the genocide of the Rohingya Muslim minority in Myanmar and called for a stronger response to the crisis.

Schatz spearheaded a nonbinding resolution in July 2018 "warning President Trump not to let the Russian government question diplomats and other officials". The resolution states the United States "should refuse to make available any current or former diplomat, civil servant, political appointee, law enforcement official or member of the Armed Forces of the United States for questioning by the government of Vladimir Putin". It passed by a vote of 98–0.

In 2024, Schatz introduced an amendment to a national security package endorsing the creation of a Palestinian state in response to the 2023 Israeli invasion of the Gaza Strip and inflammatory statements by Benjamin Netanyahu. He called the amendment a message of "hope for a peaceful and prosperous and healthy future". In April 2025, Schatz voted for a pair of resolutions proposed by Senator Bernie Sanders to cancel the Trump administration's sales of $8.8 billion in bombs and other munitions to Israel. The proposals were defeated, 82 to 15.

=== Gun law ===
Schatz supports gun control legislation. He voted for a 2013 bill banning high-capacity magazines of over 10 bullets, and co-sponsored legislation requiring background checks for every firearm sale in 2019.

Schatz participated in the Chris Murphy gun control filibuster in 2016. He expressed disappointment when both the Democrat-proposed Feinstein Amendment (making the sale of firearms to individuals on the terrorist watchlist illegal) and the Republican-supported background check changes and gun sale alert system did not pass the Senate. He said:

More than 90% of Americans demand we take action on gun violence, but again Senate Republicans refuse to act. It's unacceptable. Right now, known terrorists are banned from getting on an airplane, but they are still allowed to buy military-style weapons. It is absolutely insane. After one of the most horrific mass shootings in our history, we saw people across the country courageously stand up against gun violence and hatred. When will Republicans in Congress finally do the same?

In response to the 2017 Las Vegas shooting, Schatz said, "We can do more than lower the flag to half-mast. We can take a stand against gun violence by passing common-sense gun safety laws."

=== Health care ===
Schatz supports Senator Bernie Sanders's single-payer proposal, but also introduced his own proposal which would allow states to expand Medicaid into a universal system. Schatz supports the Affordable Care Act but supported a religious exemption from its individual mandate.

=== Housing ===
In April 2019, Schatz was one of 41 senators to sign a bipartisan letter to the housing subcommittee praising the Department of Housing and Urban Development's Section 4 Capacity Building program as authorizing "HUD to partner with national nonprofit community development organizations to provide education, training, and financial support to local community development corporations (CDCs) across the country" and expressing disappointment that President Trump's budget "has slated this program for elimination after decades of successful economic and community development." The senators wrote of their hope that the subcommittee would support continued funding for Section 4 in Fiscal Year 2020.

In 2021, Schatz and Senator Todd Young co-authored the Yes in My Backyard (YIMBY) Act, which created a federal fund that encourages new home construction and less restrictive local zoning laws. The bill passed as part of the $1.7 trillion spending bill (H.R. 2617) on December 20, 2022.

In March 2026, Schatz was the sole Democratic senator to vote against the 21st Century ROAD to Housing Act, which passed 89–10. He objected to a provision requiring investors with more than 350 homes to sell single-family homes being used as rental properties within seven years, calling the requirement "bananas" and "positively Soviet". He argued the language was a "drafting error" that would "demonize people who want to build rental housing".

=== Privacy rights and cybersecurity ===
In one of his first Senate votes, Schatz voted against the FISA Amendments Act Reauthorization Act of 2012. On April 17, 2013, he voted to expand background checks for gun purchases.

Schatz voted for the Cybersecurity Information Sharing Act, a bill many civil liberties groups opposed.

In January 2025, Schatz and Senators Chris Murphy, Ted Cruz, and Katie Britt introduced the Kids Off Social Media Act (KOSMA). Senators John Curtis, Peter Welch, John Fetterman, Ted Budd, Mark Warner, and Angus King also co-sponsored the act, which would set a minimum age of 13 to use social media platforms and prevent social media companies from feeding "algorithmically targeted" content to users under 17. Schatz said: "There is no good reason for a nine-year-old to be on Instagram or Snapchat. The growing evidence is clear: social media is making kids more depressed, more anxious, and more suicidal. Yet tech companies refuse to anything about it because it would hurt their bottom line. This is an urgent health crisis, and Congress must act with the boldness and urgency it demands". He continued, "Protecting kids online is not a partisan issue, and our bipartisan coalition—which includes several parents of kids and teenagers—represents the millions of parents across the country who've long been asking for help".

=== Supreme court nominees ===
Of Trump's 2017 Supreme Court nominee Neil Gorsuch, Schatz said in a statement, "We need to know if Judge Gorsuch will serve as an independent check on the executive and legislative branches. We need to know if Judge Gorsuch will interpret the law fairly or reliably favor the powerful. And we need to know if he will uphold the right to privacy, the basis for a woman's right to choose. Judge Gorsuch has refused to give the Senate any clarity. In case after case, Judge Gorsuch consistently sided with corporations over individuals, undermined women’s rights, and failed to protect workers." Schatz voted against Gorsuch's confirmation, but he was confirmed in a 54–45 vote.

Of Trump's 2018 Supreme Court nominee Brett Kavanaugh, Schatz said in a statement, "Judge Brett Kavanaugh has a troubling record of undermining civil liberties, opposing environmental protection, favoring corporations over workers, and undermining reproductive rights". Schatz also said the FBI should investigate the allegations against Kavanaugh. Schatz voted against Kavanaugh's nomination, but Kavanaugh was confirmed in a 50–48 vote.

Schatz did not support Trump's 2020 Supreme Court nominee Amy Coney Barrett. He said in a statement, "We are just weeks away from Election Day, but Republicans are rushing to confirm a justice to the Supreme Court before the American people get a chance to make their voices heard. They are hurrying their nominee onto the Court to help overturn the Affordable Care Act, kicking millions off their health care in the middle of the worst public health crisis in a century. With voting already underway, the people should decide who they think should pick our next Supreme Court justice. I will not support this nominee". Schatz voted against Barrett's nomination, but she was confirmed in a 52–48 vote.

In April 2022, Schatz met with Joe Biden's Supreme Court nominee Ketanji Brown Jackson. Schatz called her "exceptionally qualified to serve on the Supreme Court" and said, "Throughout her years of public service, she has demonstrated a dedication to the Constitution, including a strong commitment to equal justice under the law". Schatz voted to confirm Jackson's nomination, and she was confirmed in a 53–47 vote.

=== Trump's cabinet nominees, first term ===
Of Trump's 2017 Secretary of State nominee Rex Tillerson, Schatz said in a statement, "From international human rights to the grave threats facing our country, Mr. Tillerson’s views do not align with well-established, bipartisan foreign policy. The United States has built our global leadership on a foundation of core American values of liberty and justice for all—values that were missing from Mr. Tillerson’s testimony in his nomination hearing. After reviewing his record and his testimony before the Senate, I do not believe Mr. Tillerson is the right person to lead the State Department. I will vote no on his nomination to lead the State Department." Tillerson was confirmed in a 56–43 vote.

Schatz voted to confirm Mike Pompeo as CIA Director in 2017. When Trump nominated Pompeo to succeed Tillerson as Secretary of State in 2018, Schatz said on Twitter (now X), "I voted YES on Pompeo for CIA on the theory that he would be the 'adult in the room.' I was wrong. I am voting NO on Pompeo for Secretary of State because our top diplomat should believe in diplomacy. He has an alarming tendency towards military provocation and brinkmanship." Pompeo was confirmed in a 57–42 vote.

Of Trump's 2017 Secretary of the Treasury nominee Steven Mnuchin, Schatz said in a statement, "Steven Mnuchin has a troubling business record using predatory business tactics. The United States government entrusted his company, OneWest, to help seniors and working families stay in their homes during the housing crisis. His company did the exact opposite, preying on vulnerable homeowners and profiting from it. In addition to his disturbing record, Steven Mnuchin has pledged to roll back the consumer protections that were put into place to stop the kind of reckless practices that caused the financial crisis in 2008. This is dangerous and irresponsible, and that’s why I will be voting no on Steven Mnuchin’s confirmation." Mnuchin was confirmed in a 51–48 vote.

In 2017, Schatz voted to confirm Trump's nominee Jim Mattis as Secretary of Defense. Mattis was confirmed in a 98–1 vote. After Mattis resigned, effective in 2019, Trump nominated Mark Esper for the position. Schatz voted to confirm Esper, who was confirmed in a 90–8 vote.

In 2017, Schatz voted against Trump's Attorney General nominee, Jeff Sessions. He said in a statement, "Throughout Sen. Sessions' career, he has been on the wrong side of history. As a U.S. attorney and in the Senate, he failed to protect fundamental civil rights, including the right to vote. When he had the chance to protect equal rights for LGBTQ Americans and help reform a racially biased and outdated sentencing system, he refused to do so. When the Department of Justice worked to end racial discrimination and the use of excessive force by police, he stood in opposition. And when confronted with the reality of the president's inhumane plan to deport undocumented children who call the United States home, he showed zero empathy. Time and time again, when presented with the opportunity to advocate for the central mission of the Justice Department—pursuing equal justice for all—Sen. Sessions fell short." Sessions was confirmed in a 52–47 vote. After Sessions resigned, Trump nominated William Barr (attorney general under President George H. W. Bush) to the position. Schatz voted against Barr, saying, "Mr. Barr has been clear where he should be vague, and vague where he should be clear". Barr was confirmed in a 54–45 vote.

In 2017, Trump nominated Ryan Zinke for Secretary of the Interior. Schatz voted against his nomination, but he was confirmed in a 67–31 vote. After Zinke resigned, Trump nominated David Bernhardt to the position. Schatz voted against Bernhardt's nomination, but he was confirmed in a 56–41 vote.

Trump nominated Sonny Perdue for Secretary of Agriculture in 2017. Schatz voted to confirm Perdue, and he was confirmed in an 87–11 vote.

Trump nominated Wilbur Ross for Secretary of Commerce in 2017. Schatz voted to confirm Ross, and he was confirmed in a 72–27 vote.

Trump nominated Tom Price for Secretary of Health and Human Services in 2017. Schatz expressed concern about Price's nomination and voted against it. Price was confirmed in a 52–47 vote. After Price's controversial tenure and resignation, Trump nominated Alex Azar to fill the position. Schatz voted against Azar, citing his positions on the Affordable Care Act and the healthcare system. Azar was confirmed in a 55–43 vote.

=== Joe Biden cabinet nominees ===
Schatz voted to confirm nearly all of President Joe Biden's cabinet nominees, including Antony Blinken as Secretary of State, Janet Yellen as Secretary of the Treasury, Lloyd Austin as Secretary of Defense, Merrick Garland as Attorney General, Deb Haaland as Secretary of the Interior, Tom Vilsack as Secretary of Agriculture, Gina Raimondo as Secretary of Commerce, Marty Walsh as Secretary of Labor, and Xavier Beccera as Secretary of Health and Human Services. All were confirmed.

== Personal life ==
Schatz is married to Linda Kwok Kai Yun. They have two children.

Schatz has three brothers, including an identical twin brother, Steve. Steve is executive director of Hawaii P-20 Partnerships for Education, an interagency educational partnership at the University of Hawaii at Manoa. He formerly ran the Hawaii Department of Education's Office of Strategic Reform.

Schatz's father, Irwin Schatz, died on April 1, 2015, of metastatic melanoma.

As a U.S. senator, Schatz is one of Pomona's highest-profile alumni; Pomona invited him to be the commencement speaker for its Class of 2017.

== Electoral history ==
2010 Hawaii Lieutenant Governor Democratic primary results
Party	Candidate	Votes	%
Democratic	Brian Schatz	83,431	34.8
Democratic	Robert Bunda	45,973	19.2
Democratic	Norman Sakamoto	44,462	18.5
Democratic	Gary Hooser	22,878	9.5
Democratic	Lyla Berg	20,161	8.4
Democratic	Jon Riki Karamatsu	6,746	2.8
Democratic	Steve Hirakami	2,695	1.1
Total votes		226,346	100

Hawaii gubernatorial election, 2010
Party	Candidate	Votes	%	±%
Democratic	Neil Abercrombie / Brian Schatz	222,724	57.8%	
Republican	Duke Aiona / Lynn Finnegan	157,311	40.8%	
Free Energy Party	Daniel Cunningham / Deborah Spence	1,265	.3%	
Non-partisan	Tom Pollard / Leonard Kama	1,263	.3%	
Turnout		380,035	55.7%	
Democratic gain from Republican				

2014 U.S. Senate Hawaii Democratic primary results
Party	Candidate	Votes	%
Democratic	Brian Schatz (incumbent)	115,445	48.5%
Democratic	Colleen Hanabusa	113,663	47.7%
Democratic	Brian Evans	4,842	2.0%
Democratic	Blank vote	3,842	1.6%
Democratic	Over vote	150	0.2%
Total votes		237,942	100.0%

United States Senate special election in Hawaii, 2014
Party	Candidate	Votes	%	±%
Democratic	Brian Schatz (incumbent)	246,827	69.78%	−5.03%
Republican	Campbell Cavasso	98,006	27.70%	+6.13%
Libertarian	Michael Kokoski	8,941	2.52%	+1.72%
Total votes		'353,774'	'100.0%'	N/A
Democratic hold				

U.S. Senate Election Hawaii 2016 - Democratic primary election
Party	Candidate	Votes	%
Democratic	Brian Schatz (Incumbent)	162,891	86.17%
Democratic	Makani Christensen	11,898	6.29%
Democratic	Miles Shiratori	8,620	4.56%
Democratic	Arturo Reyes	3,819	2.02%
Democratic	Tutz Honeychurch	1,815	0.96%
Total votes		189,043	100.00%

U.S. Senate Election Hawaii 2016
Party	Candidate	Votes	%	±%
Democratic	Brian Schatz (Incumbent)	306,604	70.1%	N/A
Republican	John Carroll	92,653	21.2%	N/A
Constitution	Joy Allison	9,103	2.1%	N/A
Libertarian	Michael Kokowski	6,809	1.6%	N/A
Independent	John Giuffre	1,393	0.3%	
	Blank votes	20,763	4.7%	
	Over votes	339	0.0%	
Majority		213,951	48.88%	
Total votes		437,664	100.0%	
Democratic hold		Swing		

U.S. Senate Election Hawaii 2022
Party	Candidate	Votes	%	±%
Democratic	Brian Schatz (Incumbent)	289,585	71.25%	–2.41
Republican	Bob McDermott	105,704	26.01%	+3.76
Libertarian	Feena Bonoan	4,870	1.20%	–0.63
Green	Emma Jane Pohlman	4,102	1.01%	N/A
Aloha ʻĀina	Dan Decker	2,189	0.54%	N/A
Total votes		406,450	100.0%	
Democratic hold				

== Notes ==
Party political offices
Preceded by Jeani Withington	Chair of the Hawaii Democratic Party; 2008–2010	Succeeded by Dante Carpenter
Preceded by Malama Solomon	Democratic nominee for Lieutenant Governor of Hawaii; 2010	Succeeded by Shan Tsutsui
Preceded by Daniel Inouye	Democratic nominee for U.S. Senator from Hawaii (Class 3); 2014, 2016, 2022	Most recent
Preceded by Barbara Boxer	Senate Democratic Chief Deputy Whip; 2017–2023; Served alongside: Cory Booker (2017–2021), Jeff Merkley	Succeeded by Jeff Merkley
New office	Deputy Secretary of the Senate Democratic Caucus; 2023–present Served alongside: Chris Murphy (2025–present)	Incumbent
Preceded by Jeff Merkley	Senate Democratic Chief Deputy Whip; 2025–present	Incumbent
Political offices
Preceded by Duke Aiona	Lieutenant Governor of Hawaii; 2010–2012	Succeeded by Shan Tsutsui
U.S. Senate
Preceded by Daniel Inouye	U.S. Senator (Class 3) from Hawaii; 2012–present Served alongside: Daniel Akaka, Mazie Hirono	Incumbent
Preceded by John Hoeven	Chair of the Senate Indian Affairs Committee; 2021–2025	Succeeded by Lisa Murkowski
Preceded by Lisa Murkowski	Ranking Member of the Senate Indian Affairs Committee; 2025–present	Incumbent
Honorary titles
Preceded by Mike Lee	Baby of the Senate; 2012–2013	Succeeded by Chris Murphy
U.S. order of precedence (ceremonial)
Preceded by Mike Lee	Order of precedence of the United States as United States Senator	Succeeded by Chris Murphy
Preceded by Mike Lee	United States senators by seniority 33rd	Succeeded by Tim Scott
