= 2010 United States Senate election in Hawaii =

- November 2, 2010
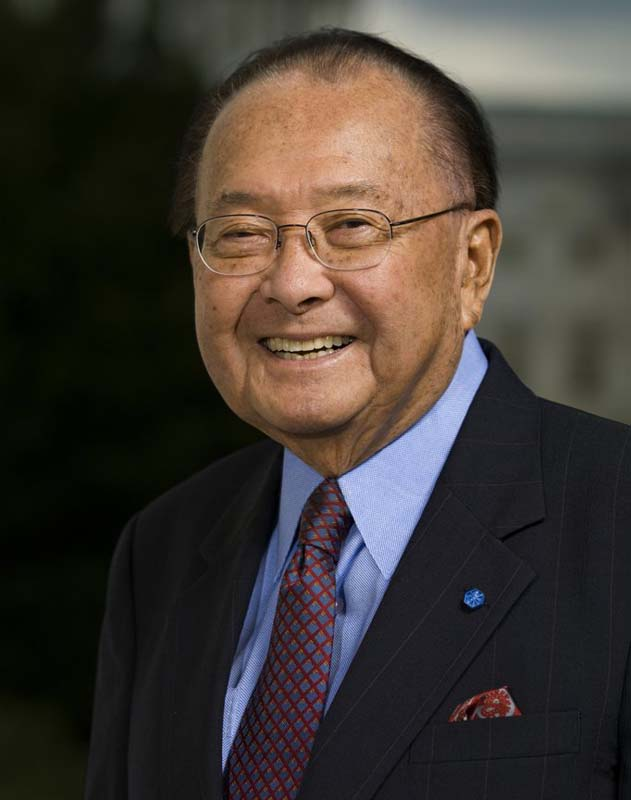

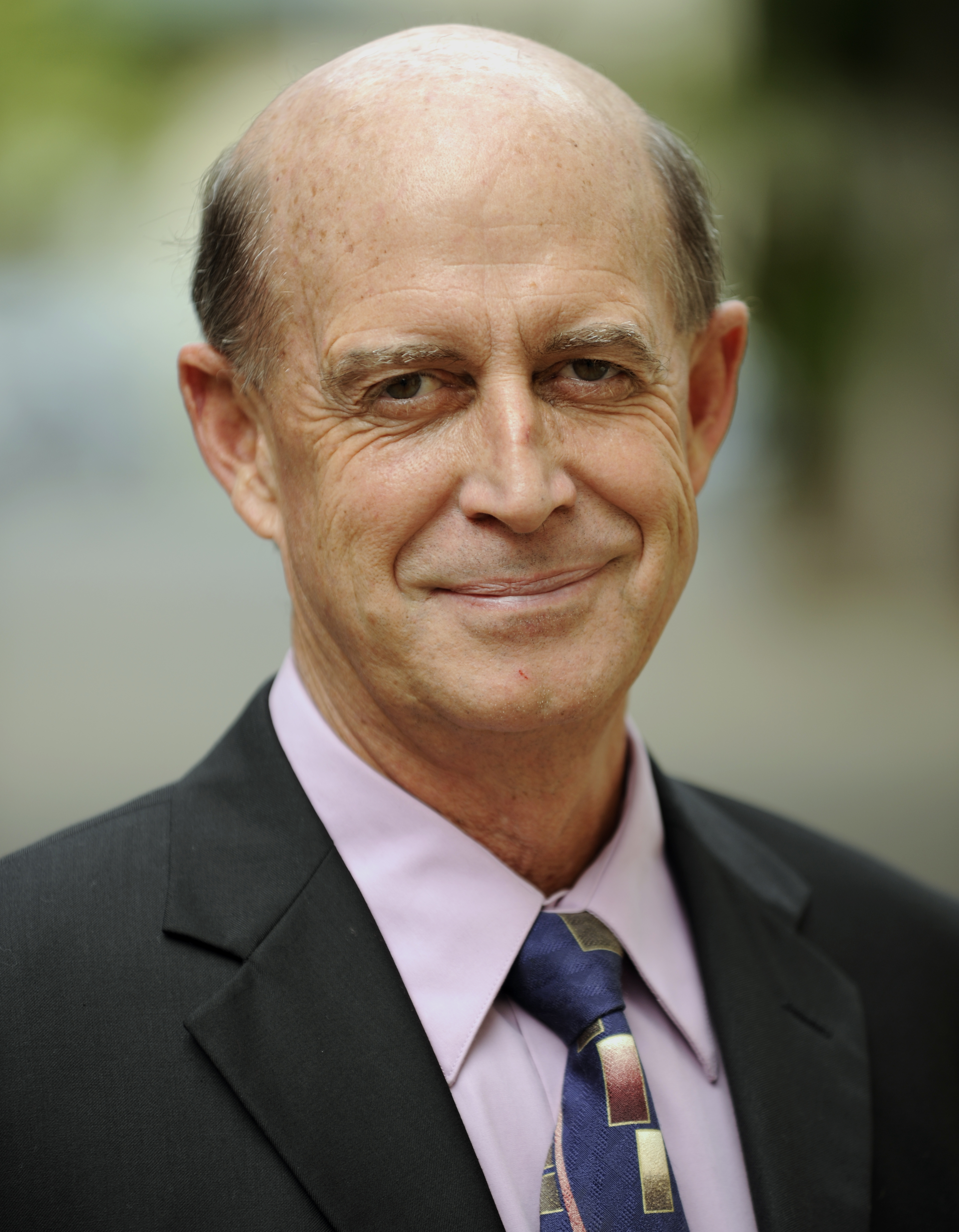
Nominee	Daniel Inouye	Campbell Cavasso
Party	Democratic	Republican
Popular vote	277,228	79,939
Percentage	74.81%	21.57%
- County results Inouye: 70–80%
U.S. senator before election
Daniel Inouye
Democratic
Elected U.S. Senator
Daniel Inouye
Democratic

The 2010 United States Senate election in Hawaii took place on November 2, 2010, concurrently with elections to the United States Senate in other states as well as elections to the United States House of Representatives and various state and local elections. The primary elections were held on September 18, 2010. Incumbent Senator Daniel Inouye, also the President pro tempore, secured the Democratic nomination with over 88 percent of the vote over his sole challenger, businessman Andy Woerner, while former state legislator (and Inouye's 2004 opponent) Campbell Cavasso won the Republican nomination with two-thirds of the primary vote.

Focuses of the campaign included Inouye's seniority and ability to direct federal resources to the state, as well as Cavasso's emphases on change and fiscal responsibility. Polling found Inouye with a large lead, although one poll gave the Democrat a lead of only thirteen points, greatly underestimating his share of the vote. Inouye won re-election to his ninth and final term, with nearly 75 percent of the vote to Cavasso's 21.6 percent. The Senator would not serve out his ninth term, as he died in December 2012 and was replaced by appointed then-Lieutenant governor Brian Schatz.

== Background ==
Hawaii last elected a Republican Senator in 1970, and its current delegation to the United States Congress currently consists entirely of Democrats. Democrats have also won Hawaii's electoral votes in every presidential election since Ronald Reagan's landslide election in 1984. The exceptions at the time were then-Governor Linda Lingle (who was serving her second and final term) and then-U.S. Representative Charles Djou, both of whom are Republicans.

== Democratic primary ==
=== Candidates ===
- Daniel Inouye, incumbent U.S. Senator
- Andy Woerner, businessman

=== Results ===
Democratic primary results
Party	Candidate	Votes	%
Democratic	Daniel Inouye (incumbent)	188,400	88.3%
Democratic	Andy Woerner	25,016	11.7%
Total votes		213,416	100.0%

== Republican primary ==
=== Candidates ===
- Campbell Cavasso, former State Representative, candidate for Lieutenant Governor in 2002, and nominee for U.S. Senate in 2004
- Eddie Pirkowski, businessman and U.S. Senate candidate in the 2006 primary
- John Roco

=== Declined ===
- Linda Lingle, Governor of Hawaii from 2003 to 2011

=== Results ===
Results by county: Cavasso—70–80% Cavasso—60–70% Cavasso—50–60%

Republican primary results
Party	Candidate	Votes	%
Republican	Campbell Cavasso	21,865	66.7%
Republican	John Roco	7,190	21.9%
Republican	Eddie Pirkowski	3,744	11.4%
Total votes		32,790	100.0%

== General election ==
=== Candidates ===
- Democratic: Daniel Inouye
- Republican: Campbell Cavasso
- Green: Jim Brewer
- Libertarian: Lloyd Mallan
- Independent: Jeff Jarrett

=== Predictions ===
Source	Ranking	As of
Cook Political Report	Solid D	October 26, 2010
Rothenberg	Safe D	October 22, 2010
RealClearPolitics	Safe D	October 26, 2010
Sabato's Crystal Ball	Safe D	October 21, 2010
CQ Politics	Safe D	October 26, 2010

=== Campaign ===
The death of longtime U.S. Senator Robert Byrd allowed Inouye to become the President pro tempore and Chairman of the United States Senate Committee on Appropriations. He made no apologies for bringing home as much federal money as he could, despite Republican insistence that the U.S. government taxed and spent too much, a stance he called a "nice gimmick". The Maui News endorsed his reelection.

Cavasso, the 2004 nominee, won the Republican primary again, and ran on a platform of change, emphasizing the need for a balanced budget. Inouye, who defeated Cavasso in 2004 by 52 percentage points, released TV ads that referred to himself simply as "Dan". The senator was said to be "working" for Hawaii's transportation, high-tech economy, education and other needs.

=== Polling ===
A Rasmussen Reports poll of 500 likely voters conducted on October 13 gave Inouye only a thirteen-point lead over Cavasso, and found the Republican with a modest lead among independent voters. However, the poll would ultimately miss the final margin by forty percentage points. FiveThirtyEight's Nate Silver awarded the Rasmussen poll his "worst poll award", citing it as evidence of the pollster's bias against Democratic candidates and observing that it was, as of November 2010, the largest error of any electoral poll in the Fivethirtyeight databases going back to 1998.

Hypothetical polling numbers with John Roco (R)

Poll source	Date(s) administered	Sample size	Margin of error	Daniel Inouye (D)	John Roco (R)	Other	Undecided
Rasmussen Reports	June 24, 2010	500	± 4.5%	68%	20%	3%	8%

Poll source	Date(s) administered	Sample size	Margin of error	Daniel Inouye (D)	Cam Cavasso (R)	Other	Undecided
Rasmussen Reports	October 13, 2010	500	± 4.5%	53%	40%	3%	4%
Public Policy Polling	October 2–3, 2010	1326	± 2.7%	65%	29%	—	6%

=== Fundraising ===
Candidate (party)	Receipts	Disbursements	Cash on hand	Debt
Daniel Inouye (D)	$3,503,323	$3,814,829	$1,506,305	$0
Campbell Cavasso (R)	$252,711	$238,794	$14,385	$126,179
Source: Federal Election Commission

=== Results ===
United States Senate election in Hawaii, 2010
Party	Candidate	Votes	%	±%
Democratic	Daniel Inouye (incumbent)	277,228	74.81%	−0.70%
Republican	Campbell Cavasso	79,939	21.57%	+0.58%
Green	Jim Brewer	7,762	2.09%	N/A
Libertarian	Lloyd Jeffrey Mallen	2,957	0.80%	−0.47%
Independent	Jeff Jarrett	2,697	0.73%	N/A
Total votes		370,583	100.00%	
Democratic hold				

==== By county ====
By county

County	Daniel Inouye Democratic		Campbell Cavasso Republican		All Others	
County	#	%	#	%	#	%
Hawaii	39,001	74.67%	10,684	20.45%	2,547	4.87%
Honolulu	189,673	74.23%	57,502	22.5%	8,355	3.31%
Kauaʻi	17,192	78.72%	3,732	17.09%	915	4.19%
Maui	31,301	76.52%	8,006	19.57%	1,598	3.9%
Totals	277,228	74.81%	79,939	21.57%	13,416	3.62%
