= 2004 United States Senate election in Hawaii =

- November 2, 2004
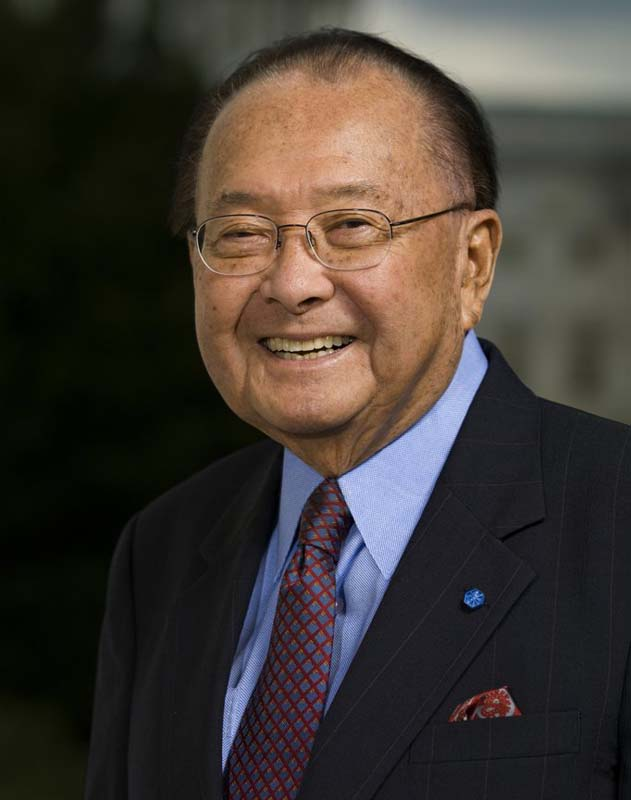

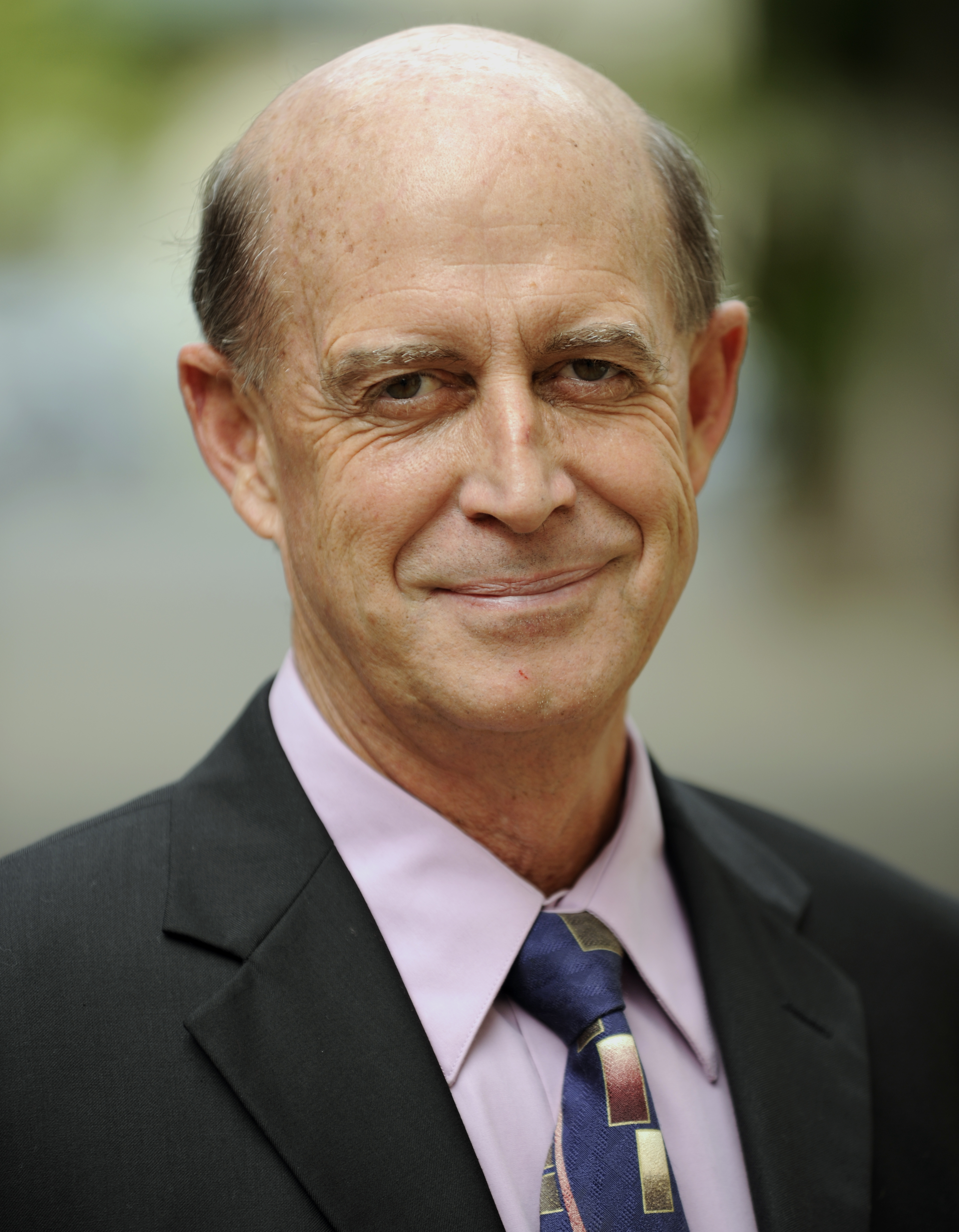
Nominee	Daniel Inouye	Campbell Cavasso
Party	Democratic	Republican
Popular vote	313,629	87,172
Percentage	75.51%	20.99%
- County results Inouye: 70–80%
U.S. senator before election
Daniel Inouye
Democratic
Elected U.S. Senator
Daniel Inouye
Democratic

The 2004 United States Senate election in Hawaii took place on November 2, 2004 alongside other elections to the United States Senate in other states as well as elections to the United States House of Representatives and various state and local elections. Incumbent Democrat U.S. Senator Daniel Inouye won re-election to an eighth term in yet another landslide with over 75% of the vote, despite the state's relatively close single-digit margin of victory for John Kerry in the concurrent presidential election.

== Major candidates ==
=== Democratic ===
- Daniel Inouye, incumbent U.S. Senator

=== Republican ===
- Campbell Cavasso, former State Representative and candidate for Lieutenant Governor in 2002

== General election ==
=== Predictions ===
Source	Ranking	As of
Sabato's Crystal Ball	Safe D	November 1, 2004

=== Endorsements ===
Daniel Inouye (D)

Newspapers

- Hawaii Tribune-Herald
- The Honolulu Advertiser
- Honolulu Star-Bulletin

=== Results ===
Inouye won every county with at least 70% of the vote. His best performance was in Kauaʻi County, where he won with about 80%; it was also Cavasso's weakest performance, getting just 16.5% of the vote there.

General election results
Party	Candidate	Votes	%	±%
Democratic	Daniel Inouye (incumbent)	313,629	75.51%	−3.67%
Republican	Campbell Cavasso	87,172	20.99%	+3.15%
Independent	Jim Brewer	9,269	2.23%	N/A
Libertarian	Lloyd Jeffrey Mallan	5,277	1.27%	−1.72%
Total votes		415,347	100%	
Democratic hold				

==== By county ====
County	Daniel Inouye Democratic		Cam Cavasso Republican		All Others		Margin		Total votes cast
County	#	%	#	%	#	%	#	%	Total votes cast
Hawaii	41,840	74.8%	11,583	20.7%	2,522	4.5%	30,257	54.1%	55,945
Honolulu	218,464	75.4%	62,027	21.4%	9,267	3.2%	156,437	54.0%	289,758
Kauaʻi	18,838	79.8%	3,891	16.5%	889	3.8%	14,947	63.3%	23,618
Maui	34,145	74.9%	9,620	21.1%	1,850	4.1%	24,525	53.8%	45,615
Totals	313,629	75.5%	87,172	21.0%	14,546	3.5%	226,457	54.5%	415,347

== See also ==
- 2004 United States Senate elections
