= 2008 United States House of Representatives elections in Hawaii =

- November 4, 2008

All 2 Hawaii seats to the United States House of Representatives
	Majority party	Minority party
Party	Democratic	Republican
Last election	2	0
Seats won	2	0
Seat change	Steady	Steady
Popular vote	319,956	82,540
Percentage	76.58%	19.75%
Swing	▲11.54%	▼15.21%
- County results Democratic: 70–80% 80–90%

The 2008 congressional elections in Hawaii were held on November 4, 2008 to determine who was to represent the state of Hawaii in the United States House of Representatives for the 111th Congress from January 3, 2009, until their terms of office expire on January 3, 2011. Incumbent Neil Abercrombie (D) was reelected in Hawaii's 1st congressional district. Incumbent Mazie Hirono (D) was reelected in Hawaii's 2nd congressional district.

Hawaii has two seats in the House, apportioned according to the 2000 United States census. Representatives are elected for two-year terms. The election coincided with the 2008 U.S. presidential election.

== Overview ==
United States House of Representatives elections in Hawaii, 2008
Party	Votes	Percentage	Seats	+/–
Democratic	319,956	76.58%	2	—
Republican	82,540	19.75%	0	—
Libertarian	11,293	2.70%	0	—
Independents	4,042	0.97%	0	—
Totals	417,831	100.00%	2	—

== District 1 ==
First district election
- November 4, 2008
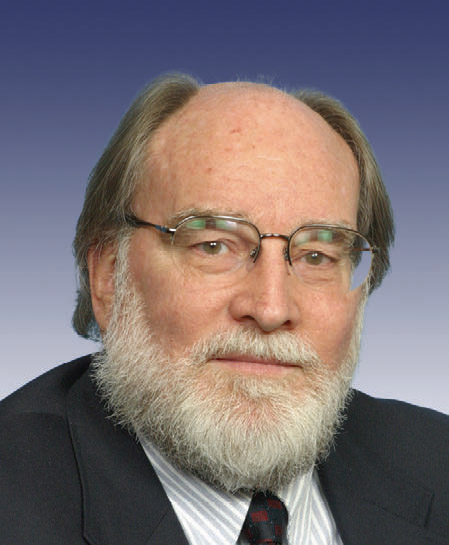

Nominee	Neil Abercrombie	Steve Tataii
Party	Democratic	Republican
Popular vote	154,208	38,115
Percentage	80.18%	19.81%
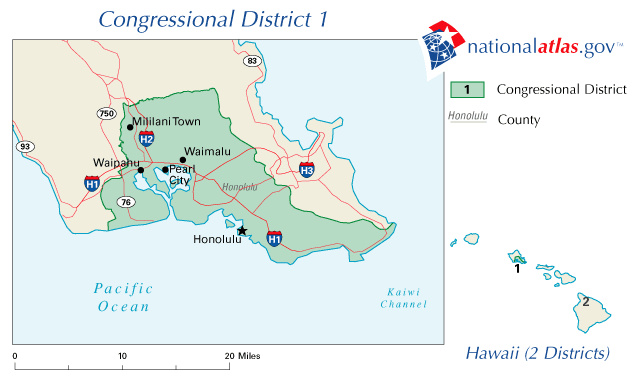
U.S. Representative before election
Neil Abercrombie
Democratic
Elected U.S. Representative
Neil Abercrombie
Democratic

This district has been represented by Democrat Neil Abercrombie since 1991. He ran against Republican Steve Tataii and Libertarian Li Zhao.

=== Predictions ===
Source	Ranking	As of
The Cook Political Report	Safe D	November 6, 2008
Rothenberg	Safe D	November 2, 2008
Sabato's Crystal Ball	Safe D	November 6, 2008
Real Clear Politics	Safe D	November 7, 2008
CQ Politics	Safe D	November 6, 2008

Hawaii's 1st congressional district election, 2008
Party	Candidate	Votes	%
Democratic	Neil Abercrombie (inc.)	154,208	77.14
Republican	Steve Tataii	38,115	19.07
Libertarian	Li Zhao	7,594	3.80
Total votes		199,917	100.00
Democratic hold			

== District 2 ==
Second district election
- November 4, 2008
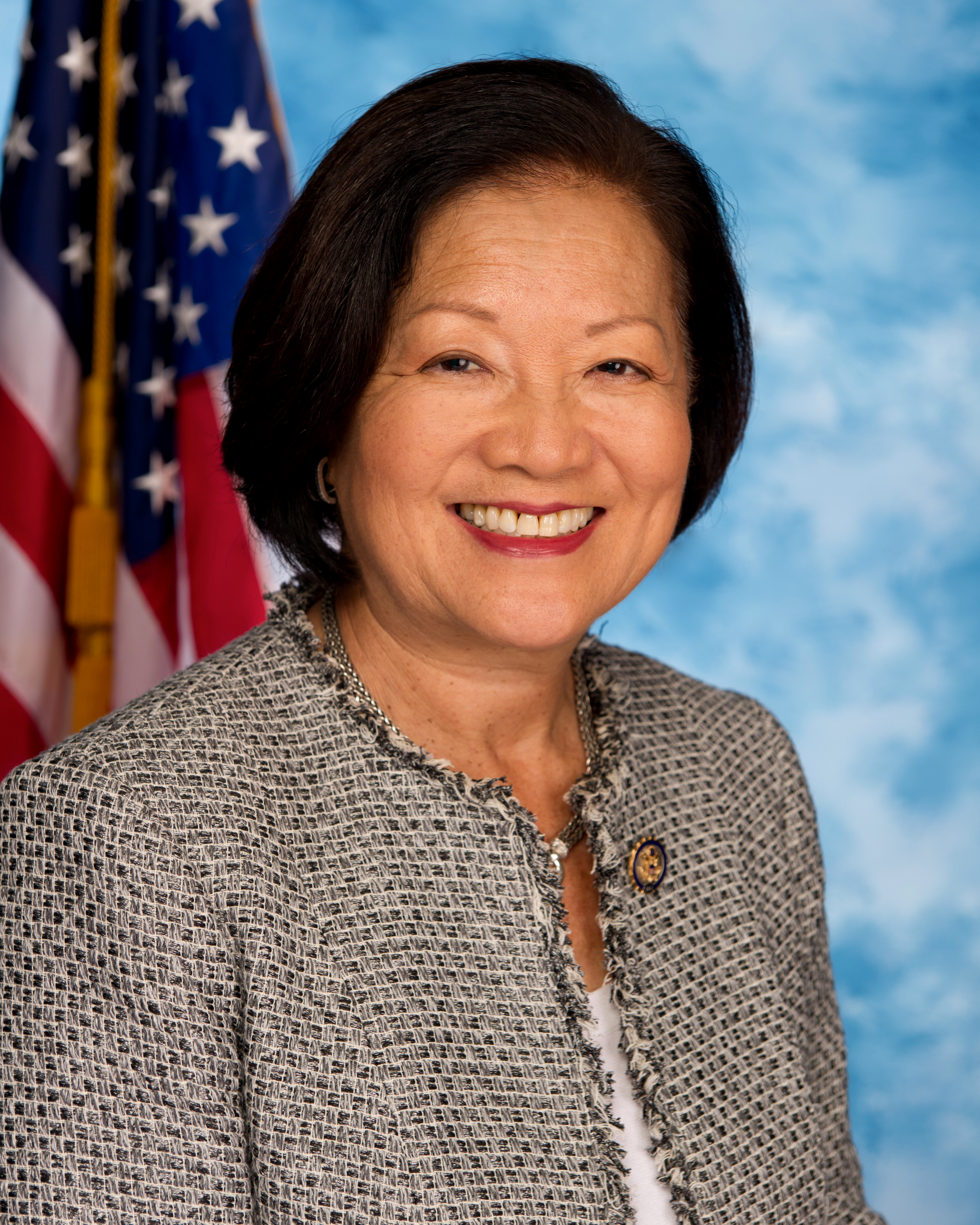

Nominee	Mazie Hirono	Roger B. Evans
Party	Democratic	Republican
Popular vote	165,748	44,425
Percentage	78.85%	21.14%
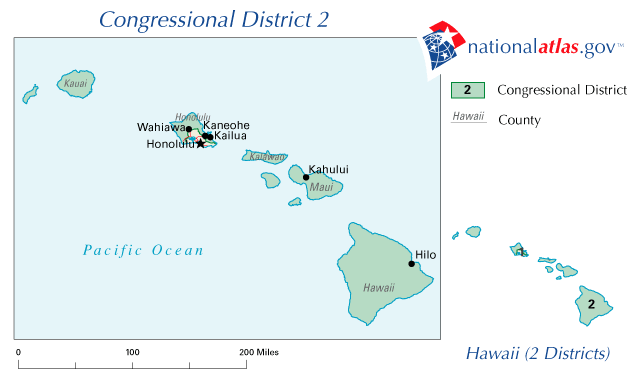
U.S. Representative before election
Mazie Hirono
Democratic
Elected U.S. Representative
Mazie Hirono
Democratic

This district has been represented by Democrat Mazie Hirono since 2007. She ran against Republican Roger B. Evans, Independent Shaun Stenshol, and Libertarian Jeff Mallan.

=== Predictions ===
Source	Ranking	As of
The Cook Political Report	Safe D	November 6, 2008
Rothenberg	Safe D	November 2, 2008
Sabato's Crystal Ball	Safe D	November 6, 2008
Real Clear Politics	Safe D	November 7, 2008
CQ Politics	Safe D	November 6, 2008

Hawaii's 2nd congressional district election, 2008
Party	Candidate	Votes	%
Democratic	Mazie Hirono (inc.)	165,748	76.06
Republican	Roger B. Evans	44,425	20.39
Independent	Shaun Stenshol	4,042	1.85
Libertarian	Jeff Mallan	3,699	1.70
Total votes		217,914	100.00
Democratic hold			

Preceded by 2006 elections	United States House of Representatives elections in Hawaii; 2008	Succeeded by 2010 elections
