= Hawaii's 1st congressional district =

U.S. House district for Hawaii

Coordinates: 21°19′22″N 157°54′21″W

- Interactive map of district boundaries since January 3, 2023
- Representative: Ed Case; D–Kāneʻohe
- Distribution: 99.27% urban; 0.73% rural
- Population (2025): 707,366
- Median household income: $111,274
- Ethnicity: 49.9% Asian; 17.5% Two or more races; 14.8% White; 7.9% Pacific Islander Americans; 7.8% Hispanic; 1.8% Black; 0.4% other
- Cook PVI: D+13

Hawaii's 1st congressional district is a congressional district in the U.S. state of Hawaii. The district is entirely on the island of Oahu, encompassing the urban areas of the City and County of Honolulu, a consolidated city-county that includes Oahu's central plains and southern shores, including the towns of Aiea, Mililani, Pearl City, Waipahu, and Waimalu. The district is smaller and more densely populated than the 2nd congressional district (which comprises the rest of the state). It is represented by Democrat Ed Case.

== History ==
When Hawaii and Alaska were admitted to the Union in 1959, both new states were granted one at-large representative to Congress, pending the next United States census. In the reapportionment following the 1960 U.S. census, Hawaii gained a second U.S. representative. Instead of creating two congressional districts, the state continued to elect its representatives at large. Two representatives were first elected in 1962, and Hawaii was first represented by two U.S. representatives on January 2, 1963, upon the convening of the 88th Congress.

The 1st congressional district was created in 1971, when Hawaii began electing its representatives from districts instead of electing at-large representatives statewide.

== Recent election results from statewide races ==
Year	Office	Results
2008	President	Obama 70% – 28%
2012	President	Obama 71% – 29%
2016	President	Clinton 63% – 30%
2016	Senate	Schatz 74% – 22%
2018	Senate	Hirono 70% – 30%
2018	Governor	Ige 64% – 32%
2020	President	Biden 64% – 34%
2022	Senate	Schatz 72% – 26%
2022	Governor	Green 64% – 36%
2024	President	Harris 62% – 37%
2024	Senate	Hirono 65% – 32%

== Composition ==
For the 118th and successive Congresses (based on redistricting following the 2020 census), the district contains all or portions of the following counties and communities:

Honolulu County (20)

East Honolulu, East Kapolei, 'Ewa Beach, 'Ewa Gentry, 'Ewa Villages, Hālawa, Hickam Housing, Honolulu, Iroquois Point, Kalaeloa (part; also 2nd), Mililani Mauka, Ocean Pointe, Pearl City, Waikāne, Waikele, Waimalu, Waipahu, Waipi'o, Waipi'o Acres, West Loch Estate

== List of members representing the district ==
District established following the 91st Congress.

Member	Party	Years	Con- gress	Electoral history	District map
District created January 3, 1971
Spark Matsunaga (Honolulu)	Democratic	January 3, 1971 – January 3, 1977	92nd 93rd 94th	Redistricted from the at-large district and re-elected in 1970. Re-elected in 1972. Re-elected in 1974. Retired to run for U.S. Senator.	1971–1981
Cecil Heftel (Honolulu)	Democratic	January 3, 1977 – July 11, 1986	95th 96th 97th 98th 99th	Elected in 1976. Re-elected in 1978. Re-elected in 1980. Re-elected in 1982. Re-elected in 1984. Resigned to run for Governor of Hawaii.	1971–1981
Cecil Heftel (Honolulu)	Democratic	January 3, 1977 – July 11, 1986	95th 96th 97th 98th 99th	Elected in 1976. Re-elected in 1978. Re-elected in 1980. Re-elected in 1982. Re-elected in 1984. Resigned to run for Governor of Hawaii.	1981–1983
Cecil Heftel (Honolulu)	Democratic	January 3, 1977 – July 11, 1986	95th 96th 97th 98th 99th	Elected in 1976. Re-elected in 1978. Re-elected in 1980. Re-elected in 1982. Re-elected in 1984. Resigned to run for Governor of Hawaii.	1983–1993
Vacant		July 11, 1986 – September 20, 1986	99th		1983–1993
Neil Abercrombie (Honolulu)	Democratic	September 20, 1986 – January 3, 1987	99th	Elected to finish Heftel's term. Lost renomination.	1983–1993
Pat Saiki (Honolulu)	Republican	January 3, 1987 – January 3, 1991	100th 101st	Elected in 1986. Re-elected in 1988. Retired to run for U.S. Senator.	1983–1993
Neil Abercrombie (Honolulu)	Democratic	January 3, 1991 – February 28, 2010	102nd 103rd 104th 105th 106th 107th 108th 109th 110th 111th	Elected in 1990. Re-elected in 1992. Re-elected in 1994. Re-elected in 1996. Re-elected in 1998. Re-elected in 2000. Re-elected in 2002. Re-elected in 2004. Re-elected in 2006. Re-elected in 2008. Resigned to run for Governor of Hawaii.	1983–1993
Neil Abercrombie (Honolulu)	Democratic	January 3, 1991 – February 28, 2010	102nd 103rd 104th 105th 106th 107th 108th 109th 110th 111th	Elected in 1990. Re-elected in 1992. Re-elected in 1994. Re-elected in 1996. Re-elected in 1998. Re-elected in 2000. Re-elected in 2002. Re-elected in 2004. Re-elected in 2006. Re-elected in 2008. Resigned to run for Governor of Hawaii.	1993–2003
Neil Abercrombie (Honolulu)	Democratic	January 3, 1991 – February 28, 2010	102nd 103rd 104th 105th 106th 107th 108th 109th 110th 111th	Elected in 1990. Re-elected in 1992. Re-elected in 1994. Re-elected in 1996. Re-elected in 1998. Re-elected in 2000. Re-elected in 2002. Re-elected in 2004. Re-elected in 2006. Re-elected in 2008. Resigned to run for Governor of Hawaii.	2003–2013
Vacant		February 28, 2010 – May 22, 2010	111th		2003–2013
Charles Djou (Honolulu)	Republican	May 22, 2010 – January 3, 2011	111th	Elected to finish Abercrombie's term. Lost re-election.	2003–2013
Colleen Hanabusa (Honolulu)	Democratic	January 3, 2011 – January 3, 2015	112th 113th	Elected in 2010. Re-elected in 2012. Retired to run for U.S. Senator.	2003–2013
Colleen Hanabusa (Honolulu)	Democratic	January 3, 2011 – January 3, 2015	112th 113th	Elected in 2010. Re-elected in 2012. Retired to run for U.S. Senator.	2013–2023
Mark Takai (Aiea)	Democratic	January 3, 2015 – July 20, 2016	114th	Elected in 2014. Announced retirement, then died.	2013–2023
Vacant		July 20, 2016 – November 14, 2016	114th		2013–2023
Colleen Hanabusa (Honolulu)	Democratic	November 14, 2016 – January 3, 2019	114th 115th	Elected to finish Takai's term. Elected to full term in 2016. Retired to run for Governor of Hawaii.	2013–2023
Ed Case (Kāne'ohe)	Democratic	January 3, 2019 – present	116th 117th 118th 119th	Elected in 2018. Re-elected in 2020. Re-elected in 2022. Re-elected in 2024. Re-elected in 2026.	2013–2023
Ed Case (Kāne'ohe)	Democratic	January 3, 2019 – present	116th 117th 118th 119th	Elected in 2018. Re-elected in 2020. Re-elected in 2022. Re-elected in 2024. Re-elected in 2026.	2023–present

== Election results ==
=== 1970 ===
United States House of Representatives elections, 1970
Party	Candidate	Votes	%
Democratic	Spark Matsunaga	85,411	72.89
Republican	Richard K. Cockey	31,764	27.11
Total votes		117,175	100.0
Democratic win (new seat)			

=== 1972 ===
United States House of Representatives elections, 1972
Party	Candidate	Votes	%
Democratic	Spark Matsunaga (incumbent)	73,826	54.70
Republican	Fred W. Rohlfing	61,138	45.30
Total votes		134,964	100.0
Democratic hold			

=== 1974 ===
United States House of Representatives elections, 1974
Party	Candidate	Votes	%
Democratic	Spark Matsunaga (incumbent)	71,552	59.32
Republican	William B. Paul	49,065	40.68
Total votes		120,617	100.0
Democratic hold			

=== 1976 ===
United States House of Representatives elections, 1976
Party	Candidate	Votes	%
Democratic	Cecil Heftel	60,050	43.64
Republican	Fred W. Rohlfing	53,745	39.06
Independents for Godly Government	Kathy Joyce Hoshijo	23,807	17.30
Total votes		137,602	100.0
Democratic hold			

=== 1978 ===
United States House of Representatives elections, 1978
Party	Candidate	Votes	%
Democratic	Cecil Heftel (incumbent)	84,552	73.26
Republican	William D. Spillane	24,470	21.20
Libertarian	Peter David Larsen	4,295	3.72
Aloha Democratic Party	Debra Figueroa	2,095	1.82
Total votes		115,412	100.0
Democratic hold			

=== 1980 ===
United States House of Representatives elections, 1980
Party	Candidate	Votes	%
Democratic	Cecil Heftel (incumbent)	98,256	79.77
Republican	Aloma Keen Noble	19,819	16.09
Libertarian	Rockne H. Johnson	5,106	4.14
Total votes		123,181	100.0
Democratic hold			

=== 1982 ===
United States House of Representatives elections, 1982
Party	Candidate	Votes	%
Democratic	Cecil Heftel (incumbent)	134,779	89.91
Libertarian	Rockne H. Johnson	15,128	10.09
Total votes		149,907	100.0
Democratic hold			

=== 1984 ===
United States House of Representatives elections, 1984
Party	Candidate	Votes	%
Democratic	Cecil Heftel (incumbent)	114,884	82.73
Republican	Will Beard	20,608	14.84
Libertarian	Christopher Winter	3,373	2.43
Total votes		138,865	100.0
Democratic hold			

=== 1986 (Special) ===
Hawaii's 1st congressional district special election, 1986
Party	Candidate	Votes	%
Democratic	Neil Abercrombie	42,031	29.88
Republican	Pat Saiki	41,067	29.20
Democratic	Mufi Hannemann	39,800	28.30
Democratic	Steve Cobb	16,721	11.89
Democratic	Louis Agard	566	0.40
Nonpartisan candidate	Blase Harris	460	0.33
Total votes		140,645	100.0
Democratic hold			

=== 1986 ===
United States House of Representatives elections, 1986
Party	Candidate	Votes	%
Republican	Pat Saiki	99,683	59.20
Democratic	Mufi Hannemann	63,061	37.45
Libertarian	Blase Harris	5,633	3.35
Total votes		168,377	100.0
Republican gain from Democratic			

=== 1988 ===
United States House of Representatives elections, 1988
Party	Candidate	Votes	%
Republican	Pat Saiki (incumbent)	96,848	54.71
Democratic	Mary Bitterman	76,394	43.16
Libertarian	Blase Harris	3,778	2.13
Total votes		177,020	100.0
Republican hold			

=== 1990 ===
United States House of Representatives elections, 1990
Party	Candidate	Votes	%
Democratic	Neil Abercrombie	97,622	60.00
Republican	Mike Liu	62,982	38.71
Libertarian	Roger Lee Taylor	2,107	1.29
Total votes		162,711	100.0
Democratic gain from Republican			

=== 1992 ===
United States House of Representatives elections, 1992
Party	Candidate	Votes	%
Democratic	Neil Abercrombie (incumbent)	129,332	72.87
Republican	Warner Sutton	41,575	23.43
Libertarian	Rockne H. Johnson	6,569	3.70
Total votes		177,476	100.0
Democratic hold			

=== 1994 ===
United States House of Representatives elections, 1994
Party	Candidate	Votes	%
Democratic	Neil Abercrombie (incumbent)	94,754	53.62
Republican	Orson Swindle	76,623	43.36
Best Party of Hawaii	Alexandria Kaan	2,815	1.59
Libertarian	Roger Lee Taylor	2,514	1.42
Total votes		176,706	100.0
Democratic hold			

=== 1996 ===
United States House of Representatives elections, 1996
Party	Candidate	Votes	%
Democratic	Neil Abercrombie (incumbent)	86,732	50.37
Republican	Orson Swindle	80,053	46.49
Nonpartisan	Mark Duering	4,126	2.40
Natural Law	Nick Bedworth	1,295	0.75
Total votes		172,206	100.0
Democratic hold			

=== 1998 ===
United States House of Representatives elections, 1998
Party	Candidate	Votes	%
Democratic	Neil Abercrombie (incumbent)	116,693	61.56
Republican	Gene Ward	68,905	36.34
Natural Law	Nick Bedworth	3,973	2.10
Total votes		189,571	100.0
Democratic hold			

=== 2000 ===
United States House of Representatives elections, 2000
Party	Candidate	Votes	%
Democratic	Neil Abercrombie (incumbent)	108,517	69.03
Republican	Phil Meyers	44,989	28.62
Libertarian	Jerry Murphy	3,688	2.35
Total votes		157,194	100.0
Democratic hold			

=== 2002 ===
United States House of Representatives elections, 2002
Party	Candidate	Votes	%
Democratic	Neil Abercrombie (incumbent)	131,673	72.86
Republican	Mark Terry	45,032	24.92
Libertarian	James H. Bracken	4,028	2.23
Total votes		180,733	100.0
Democratic hold			

=== 2004 ===
United States House of Representatives elections, 2004
Party	Candidate	Votes	%
Democratic	Neil Abercrombie (incumbent)	128,567	62.97
Republican	Dalton Tanonaka	69,371	33.98
Libertarian	Elyssa Young	6,243	3.06
Total votes		204,181	100.0
Democratic hold			

=== 2006 ===
United States House of Representatives elections, 2006
Party	Candidate	Votes	%
Democratic	Neil Abercrombie (incumbent)	112,904	69.35
Republican	Richard (Noah) Hough	49,890	30.65
Total votes		162,794	100.0
Democratic hold			

=== 2008 ===
United States House of Representatives elections, 2008
Party	Candidate	Votes	%
Democratic	Neil Abercrombie (incumbent)	154,181	77.14
Republican	Steve Tataii	38,104	19.06
Libertarian	Li Zhao	7,591	3.80
Total votes		199,876	100.0
Democratic hold			

=== 2010 (Special) ===
Hawaii's 1st congressional district special election, 2010
Party	Candidate	Votes	%
Republican	Charles Djou	67,610	39.44
Democratic	Colleen Hanabusa	52,802	30.80
Democratic	Ed Case	47,391	27.65
No party	11 others	1,682	0.99
Total votes		171,417	100.0
Republican gain from Democratic			

=== 2010 ===
United States House of Representatives elections, 2010
Party	Candidate	Votes	%
Democratic	Colleen Hanabusa	94,140	53.23
Republican	Charles Djou (incumbent)	82,723	46.77
Total votes		176,863	100.0
Democratic gain from Republican			

=== 2012 ===
United States House of Representatives elections, 2012
Party	Candidate	Votes	%
Democratic	Colleen Hanabusa (incumbent)	116,505	53.47
Republican	Charles Djou	96,824	44.44
	Blank Votes	4,467	2.05
	Over Votes	80	0.04
Total votes		217,876	100

=== 2014 ===
United States House of Representatives elections, 2014
Party	Candidate	Votes	%
Democratic	Mark Takai	93,390	51.2
Republican	Charles Djou	86,454	47.4
	Blank Votes	2,366	1.3
	Over Votes	58	0.0
Total votes		182,268	100

=== 2016 (Special) ===
Hawaii's 1st Congressional District (Vacancy)
Party	Candidate	Votes	%
Democratic	Colleen Hanabusa	129,083	60.45
Republican	Shirlene D. (Shirl) Ostrov	44,090	20.65
Democratic	Angela Aulani Kaaihue	5,885	2.76
Libertarian	Alan J.K. Yim	5,559	2.60
Democratic	Kim Howard	4,259	1.99
Democratic	Peter Cross	3,420	1.60
Independent	Calvin Griffin	2,824	1.32
Democratic	Javier Ocasio	1,893	0.89
Independent	Yvonne Perry	1,050	0.49
Independent	Peter H. Plotzeneder	328	0.15
	Blank votes	14,864	6.96
	Over votes	276	0.14
Total votes		213,531	100

=== 2016 ===
Hawaii's 1st Congressional District, 2016
Party	Candidate	Votes	%
Democratic	Colleen Hanabusa	145,417	68.09
Republican	Shirlene D. (Shirl) Ostrov	45,958	21.52
Libertarian	Alan J.K. Yim	6,601	3.09
Independent	Calvin Griffin	4,381	2.05
	Blank votes	11,013	5.16
	Over votes	161	0.08
Total votes		213,558	100

=== 2018 ===
Hawaii's 1st congressional district, 2018
Party	Candidate	Votes	%
Democratic	Ed Case	134,650	73.1
Republican	Campbell Cavasso	42,498	23.1
Libertarian	Michelle Tippens	3,498	1.9
Green	Zach Burd	2,214	1.2
Nonpartisan	Calvin Griffin	1,351	0.7
Total votes		184,211	100.0
Democratic hold			

=== 2020 ===
Hawaii's 1st congressional district, 2020
Party	Candidate	Votes	%
Democratic	Ed Case (incumbent)	183,245	72.02
Republican	Ron Curtis	71,188	27.98
Total votes		254,433	100.0
Democratic hold			

=== 2022 ===
Hawaii's 1st congressional district, 2022
Party	Candidate	Votes	%
Democratic	Ed Case (incumbent)	142,742	73.7
Republican	Conrad Kress	50,833	26.3
Total votes		193,575	100.0
Democratic hold			

=== 2024 ===
2024 Hawaii's 1st congressional district election
Party	Candidate	Votes	%
Democratic	Ed Case (incumbent)	164,237	71.8
Republican	Patrick Largey	64,373	28.2
Total votes		228,610	100.0
Democratic hold			

== See also ==
- Hawaii's congressional districts
- List of United States congressional districts
