= Hawaii's 2nd congressional district =

U.S. House district for Hawaii

Coordinates: 19°48′35″N 155°30′22″W

- Interactive map of district boundaries since January 3, 2023
- Representative: Jill Tokuda; D–Kāneʻohe
- Distribution: 83.65% urban; 16.35% rural
- Population (2025): 725,454
- Median household income: $100,918
- Ethnicity: 28.4% White; 23.2% Asian; 22.6% Two or more races; 12.5% Pacific Islander Americans; 11.3% Hispanic; 1.2% Black; 0.7% other
- Cook PVI: D+12

Hawaii's 2nd congressional district is a congressional district in the U.S. state of Hawaii. It is represented by Jill Tokuda, who succeeded Kai Kahele after the 2022 election. The district encompasses all rural and most suburban areas of Oahu/Honolulu County, as well as the entire state outside of Oahu. It includes the counties of Kauaʻi, Maui, Kalawao, and Hawaii ("the Big Island"). The district spans 331 miles. The most populous community entirely within the district is Hilo. Major segments of the economy include tourism, ranching, and agriculture.

Under the U.S. Constitution, district candidates must be residents of the state, but do not have to live in the district itself. The first non-resident elected to Hawaii's 2nd district seat was Ed Case, a Honolulu attorney, though he was born and raised on the Big Island of Hawaii. The home state office of the second congressional district is at the Prince Kuhio Federal Building near Honolulu Harbor.

== History ==
When Hawaii and Alaska were admitted to the Union in 1959, both new states were granted one at-large representative to Congress pending the next United States census. In the reapportionment following the 1960 U.S. census, Hawaii gained a second U.S. representative. Instead of creating two congressional districts, the state continued to elect its U.S. representatives at large. Two representatives were first elected in 1962, and Hawaii was first represented by two U.S. representatives on January 2, 1963, upon the convening of the 88th Congress. The 2nd congressional district was created in 1971 when Hawaii began electing its representatives from districts instead of electing at-large representatives statewide.

The 2nd congressional district has a Cook Partisan Voting Index of D+12. It has supported the Democratic nominee in every presidential election since 1988, and has never elected a Republican U.S. representative. In October 2019, Representative Tulsi Gabbard announced that she would not seek reelection, instead choosing to focus on her campaign for the Democratic presidential nomination.

In January 2019, Hawaii state senator Kai Kahele announced he would run for the seat in 2020. Other Democrats who announced were David Cornejo, Brian Evans (a self-described "Berniecrat" who ran for the seat as a Republican in 2018), Noelle Famera, and Ryan Meza. Republicans Joseph Akana and Jonathan Hoomanawanui also announced. Kahele won the Democratic nomination on August 8 and the general election on November 3.

== Recent election results from statewide races ==
Year	Office	Results
2008	President	Obama 73% – 25%
2012	President	Obama 73% – 27%
2016	President	Clinton 61% – 30%
2016	Senate	Schatz 73% – 22%
2018	Senate	Hirono 72% – 28%
2018	Governor	Ige 61% – 35%
2020	President	Biden 64% – 34%
2022	Senate	Schatz 71% – 26%
2022	Governor	Green 62% – 38%
2024	President	Harris 60% – 38%
2024	Senate	Hirono 64% – 32%

== Composition ==
For the 118th and successive Congresses (based on redistricting following the 2020 census), the district contains all or portions of the following counties and communities:

Hawai'i County (55)

All 55 communities

Honolulu County (35)

'Āhuimanu, Hale'iwa, Hau'ula, He'eia, Helemano, Ka'a'awa, Kailua, Kahalu'u, Kahuku, Kalaeloa (part; also 1st), Kāneʻohe, Kāneʻohe Base, Kapolei, Kawela Bay, Ko Olina, Lā'ie, Mā'ili, Mākaha, Mākaha Valley, Makakilo, Maunawili, Mokulē'ia, Nānākuli, Punalu'u, Pūpūkea, Royal Kunia, Schofield Barracks, Wahiawa, Waiāhole-Waikāne, Waialua, Waianae, Waimānalo, Waimānalo Beach, Wheeler AFB, Whitmore Village

Kalawao County (4)

All 4 communities

Kauai County (24)

All 24 communities

Maui County (31)

All 31 communities

== List of members representing the district ==
Member	Party	Years	Cong ress	Electoral history	District map
District created January 3, 1971
Patsy Mink (Waipahu)	Democratic	January 3, 1971 — January 3, 1977	92nd 93rd 94th	Redistricted from the at-large district and re-elected in 1970. Re-elected in 1972. Re-elected in 1974. Retired to run for U.S. senator.	
Daniel Akaka (Honolulu)	Democratic	January 3, 1977 — May 15, 1990	95th 96th 97th 98th 99th 100th 101st	Elected in 1976. Re-elected in 1978. Re-elected in 1980. Re-elected in 1982. Re-elected in 1984. Re-elected in 1986. Re-elected in 1988. Resigned when appointed U.S. senator.	
Vacant		May 15, 1990 — September 22, 1990	101st		
Patsy Mink (Waipahu)	Democratic	September 22, 1990 — September 28, 2002	101st 102nd 103rd 104th 105th 106th 107th	Elected to finish Akaka's term. Re-elected in 1990. Re-elected in 1992. Re-elected in 1994. Re-elected in 1996. Re-elected in 1998. Re-elected in 2000. Died. Re-elected posthumously in 2002.	
Vacant		September 28, 2002 — November 30, 2002	107th		
Ed Case (Honolulu)	Democratic	November 30, 2002 — January 3, 2003	107th	Elected to finish Mink's term in the 107th Congress. Had not been a candidate for the next term.	
Vacant		January 3, 2003 — January 4, 2003	108th		2003–2013
Ed Case (Honolulu)	Democratic	January 4, 2003 — January 3, 2007	108th 109th	Elected to finish Mink's term in the 108th Congress. Re-elected in 2004. Retired to run for U.S. senator.	2003–2013
Mazie Hirono (Honolulu)	Democratic	January 3, 2007 — January 3, 2013	110th 111th 112th	Elected in 2006. Re-elected in 2008. Re-elected in 2010. Retired to run for U.S. senator.	2003–2013
Tulsi Gabbard (Honolulu)	Democratic	January 3, 2013 — January 3, 2021	113th 114th 115th 116th	Elected in 2012. Re-elected in 2014. Re-elected in 2016. Re-elected in 2018. Retired to run for U.S. president.	2013–2023
Kai Kahele (Hilo)	Democratic	January 3, 2021 — January 3, 2023	117th	Elected in 2020. Retired to run for Governor of Hawaii.	2013–2023
Jill Tokuda (Kāne'ohe)	Democratic	January 3, 2023 — present	118th 119th	Elected in 2022. Re-elected in 2024. Re-elected in 2026.	2023–present

== Election results ==
=== 1970 ===
1970 United States House of Representatives elections in Hawaii
Party	Candidate	Votes	%
Democratic	Patsy Mink (Incumbent)	91,038	100.00%
Total votes		91,038	100.0%
Democratic win (new seat)			

=== 1972 ===
1972 United States House of Representatives elections in Hawaii
Party	Candidate	Votes	%
Democratic	Patsy Mink (Incumbent)	79,856	57.08%
Republican	Diana Hansen-Young	60,043	42.92%
Total votes		139,899	100.0%
Democratic hold			

=== 1974 ===
1974 United States House of Representatives elections in Hawaii
Party	Candidate	Votes	%
Democratic	Patsy Mink (Incumbent)	86,916	62.58%
Republican	Carla W. Coray	51,984	37.42%
Total votes		138,900	100.0%
Democratic hold			

=== 1976 ===
1976 United States House of Representatives elections in Hawaii
Party	Candidate	Votes	%
Democratic	Daniel Akaka	124,116	79.51%
Republican	Hank Inouye	23,917	15.32%
Independents for Godly Government	Bill Penaroza	3,461	2.22%
People's Party	Dexter Cate	2,408	1.54%
Libertarian	Don Smith	2,197	1.41%
Total votes		156,099	100.0%
Democratic hold			

=== 1978 ===
1978 United States House of Representatives elections in Hawaii
Party	Candidate	Votes	%
Democratic	Daniel Akaka (Incumbent)	118,272	85.73%
Republican	Charlie Isaak	15,697	11.38%
Libertarian	Amelia L. Fritts	3,988	2.89%
Total votes		137,957	100.0%
Democratic hold			

=== 1980 ===
1980 United States House of Representatives elections in Hawaii
Party	Candidate	Votes	%
Democratic	Daniel Akaka (Incumbent)	141,477	89.90%
Libertarian	Don Smith	15,903	10.10%
Total votes		157,380	100.0%
Democratic hold			

=== 1982 ===
1982 United States House of Representatives elections in Hawaii
Party	Candidate	Votes	%
Democratic	Daniel Akaka (Incumbent)	132,072	89.23%
Nonpartisan candidate	Gregory B. Mills	9,080	6.14%
Libertarian	Amelia L. Fritts	6,856	4.63%
Total votes		148,008	100.0%
Democratic hold			

=== 1984 ===
1984 United States House of Representatives elections in Hawaii
Party	Candidate	Votes	%
Democratic	Daniel Akaka (Incumbent)	112,377	82.18%
Republican	A.D. (Al) Shipley	20,000	14.63%
Libertarian	Amelia L. Fritts	4,364	3.19%
Total votes		136,741	100.0%
Democratic hold			

=== 1986 ===
1986 United States House of Representatives elections in Hawaii
Party	Candidate	Votes	%
Democratic	Daniel Akaka (Incumbent)	123,830	76.05%
Republican	Maria M. Hustace	35,371	21.73%
Libertarian	Ken Schoolland	3,618	2.22%
Total votes		162,819	100.0%
Democratic hold			

=== 1988 ===
1988 United States House of Representatives elections in Hawaii
Party	Candidate	Votes	%
Democratic	Daniel Akaka (Incumbent)	144,802	88.94%
Libertarian	Lloyd Jeffrey Mallan	18,006	11.06%
Total votes		162,808	100.0%
Democratic hold			

=== 1990 (Special) ===
1990 Hawaii's 2nd congressional district special election
Party	Candidate	Votes	%
Democratic	Patsy Mink	51,841	37.35%
Democratic	Mufi Hannemann	50,164	36.14%
Democratic	Ron Menor	23,629	17.02%
Republican	Andy Poepoe	8,872	6.39%
Republican	Stanley Monsef	2,264	1.63%
Democratic	Duane A. Black	1,242	0.90%
Libertarian	Lloyd Jeffrey Mallan	791	0.57%
Total votes		138,803	100.0%
Democratic hold			

=== 1990 ===
1990 United States House of Representatives elections in Hawaii
Party	Candidate	Votes	%
Democratic	Patsy Mink (Incumbent)	118,155	66.27%
Republican	Andy Poepoe	54,625	30.64%
Libertarian	Lloyd Jeffrey Mallan	5,508	3.09%
Total votes		178,288	100.0%
Democratic hold			

=== 1992 ===
1992 United States House of Representatives elections in Hawaii
Party	Candidate	Votes	%
Democratic	Patsy Mink (Incumbent)	131,454	72.65%
Republican	Kamuela Price	40,070	22.14%
Libertarian	Lloyd Jeffrey Mallan	9,431	5.21%
Total votes		180,955	100.0%
Democratic hold			

=== 1994 ===
1994 United States House of Representatives elections in Hawaii
Party	Candidate	Votes	%
Democratic	Patsy Mink (Incumbent)	124,431	70.14%
Republican	Robert H. (Lopaka) Garner	42,891	24.18%
Libertarian	Larry Bartley	10,074	5.68%
Total votes		177,396	100.0%
Democratic hold			

=== 1996 ===
1996 United States House of Representatives elections in Hawaii
Party	Candidate	Votes	%
Democratic	Patsy Mink (Incumbent)	109,178	60.33%
Republican	Tom Pico Jr.	55,729	30.80%
Nonpartisan candidate	Nolan Crabbe	7,723	4.27%
Libertarian	James M. Keefe	4,769	2.64%
Natural Law	Amanda (Mandy) Toulon	3,564	1.97%
Total votes		180,963	100.0%
Democratic hold			

=== 1998 ===
1998 United States House of Representatives elections in Hawaii
Party	Candidate	Votes	%
Democratic	Patsy Mink (Incumbent)	144,254	69.40%
Republican	Carol J. Douglass	50,423	24.25%
Libertarian	Noreen Leilehua Chun	13,194	6.35%
Total votes		207,871	100.0%
Democratic hold			

=== 2000 ===
2000 United States House of Representatives elections in Hawaii
Party	Candidate	Votes	%
Democratic	Patsy Mink (Incumbent)	112,856	61.59%
Republican	Russ Francis	65,906	35.97%
Libertarian	Lawrence G.K. Duquesne	4,468	2.44%
Total votes		183,230	100.0%
Democratic hold			

=== 2002 ===
2002 United States House of Representatives elections in Hawaii
Party	Candidate	Votes	%
Democratic	Patsy Mink (Incumbent) †	100,671	56.16%
Republican	Bob McDermott	71,661	39.98%
Libertarian	Lloyd Jeffrey Mallan	4,719	2.63%
Natural Law	Nick Bedworth	2,200	1.23%
Total votes		179,251	100.0%
Democratic hold			

=== 2002 (Special) ===
Hawaii's 2nd congressional district special election, November 30, 2002
Party	Candidate	Votes	%
Democratic	Ed Case	23,576	51.44%
Democratic	John Mink	16,624	36.27%
Republican	John Carroll	1,933	4.22%
Republican	Whitney Anderson	942	2.06%
No party	34 others	2,754	5.96%
Total votes		46,216	100.0%
Democratic hold			

=== 2003 (Special) ===
Hawaii's 2nd congressional district special election, January 4, 2003
Party	Candidate	Votes	%
Democratic	Ed Case (Incumbent)	33,002	43.24%
Democratic	Matt Matsunaga	23,050	30.20%
Democratic	Colleen Hanabusa	6,046	7.92%
Republican	Barbara Marumoto	4,497	5.89%
Republican	Bob McDermott	4,298	5.63%
No party	39 others	5,435	7.12%
Total votes		76,328	100.0%
Democratic hold			

=== 2004 ===
2004 United States House of Representatives elections in Hawaii
Party	Candidate	Votes	%
Democratic	Ed Case (Incumbent)	133,317	62.77%
Republican	Mike Gabbard	79,072	37.23%
Total votes		212,389	100.0%
Democratic hold			

=== 2006 ===
2006 United States House of Representatives elections in Hawaii
Party	Candidate	Votes	%
Democratic	Mazie Hirono	106,906	61.04%
Republican	Bob Hogue	68,244	38.96%
Total votes		175,150	100.0%
Democratic hold			

=== 2008 ===
2008 United States House of Representatives elections in Hawaii
Party	Candidate	Votes	%
Democratic	Mazie Hirono (Incumbent)	165,748	76.06%
Republican	Roger B. Evans	44,425	20.39%
Independent	Shaun Stenshol	4,042	1.86%
Libertarian	Lloyd Jeffrey Mallan	3,699	1.70%
Total votes		217,914	100.0%
Democratic hold			

=== 2010 ===
2010 United States House of Representatives elections in Hawaii
Party	Candidate	Votes	%
Democratic	Mazie Hirono (Incumbent)	132,290	72.19%
Republican	John W. Willoughby	46,404	25.32%
Libertarian	Pat Brock	3,254	1.78%
Nonpartisan candidate	Andrew V. Von Sonn	1,310	0.72%
Total votes		183,258	100.0%
Democratic hold			

=== 2012 ===
2012 United States House of Representatives elections in Hawaii
Party	Candidate	Votes	%
Democratic	Tulsi Gabbard	168,466	80.54%
Republican	Kawika Crowley	40,697	19.45%
	Blank Votes	5,631	N/A
	Over Votes	73	N/A
Total votes		214,867	100%
Democratic hold			

=== 2014 ===
2014 United States House of Representatives elections in Hawaii
Party	Candidate	Votes	%
Democratic	Tulsi Gabbard (Incumbent)	142,010	78.7%
Republican	Kawika Crowley	33,630	18.6%
Libertarian	Joe Kent	4,693	2.6%
Total votes		180,333	100%
Democratic hold			

=== 2016 ===
2016 United States House of Representatives elections in Hawaii
Party	Candidate	Votes	%
Democratic	Tulsi Gabbard (Incumbent)	170,848	76.23%
Republican	Angela Aulani Kaaihue	39,668	17.70%
	Blank votes	13,483	6.02%
	Over votes	134	0.05%
Total votes		224,133	100%
Democratic hold			

=== 2018 ===
2018 United States House of Representatives elections in Hawaii
Party	Candidate	Votes	%
Democratic	Tulsi Gabbard (Incumbent)	153,271	77.4%
Republican	Brian Evans	44,850	22.6%
Total votes		198,121	100.0%
Democratic hold			

=== 2020 ===
2020 United States House of Representatives elections in Hawaii
Party	Candidate	Votes	%	±%
Democratic	Kai Kahele	172,517	63.0%	▼14.4
Republican	Joe Akana	84,027	30.9%	▲8.3
Libertarian	Michelle Rose Tippens	6,785	2.5%	▲2.5
Aloha ʻĀina	Jonathan Hoomanawanui	6,453	2.4%	▲2.4
Independent	Ron Burrus	2,659	1.0%	▲1.0
American Shopping	John Giuffre	661	0.2%	▲0.2
Total votes		273,112	100.0%	N/A
Democratic hold				

=== 2022 ===
2022 United States House of Representatives elections in Hawaii
Party	Candidate	Votes	%
Democratic	Jill Tokuda	127,995	62.3
Republican	Joe Akana	72,455	35.2
Libertarian	Michelle Tippens	5,108	2.5
Total votes		205,558	100.0
Democratic hold			

=== 2024 ===
2024 Hawaii's 2nd congressional district election
Party	Candidate	Votes	%
Democratic	Jill Tokuda (incumbent)	166,251	66.5
Republican	Steve Bond	75,471	30.2
Libertarian	Aaron Toman	4,497	1.8
Independent	Randall Meyer	3,937	1.6
Total votes		250,156	100.0
Democratic hold			

== Historical district boundaries ==
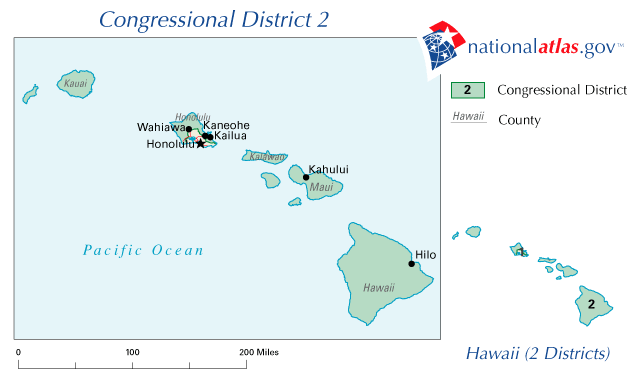
2003–2013

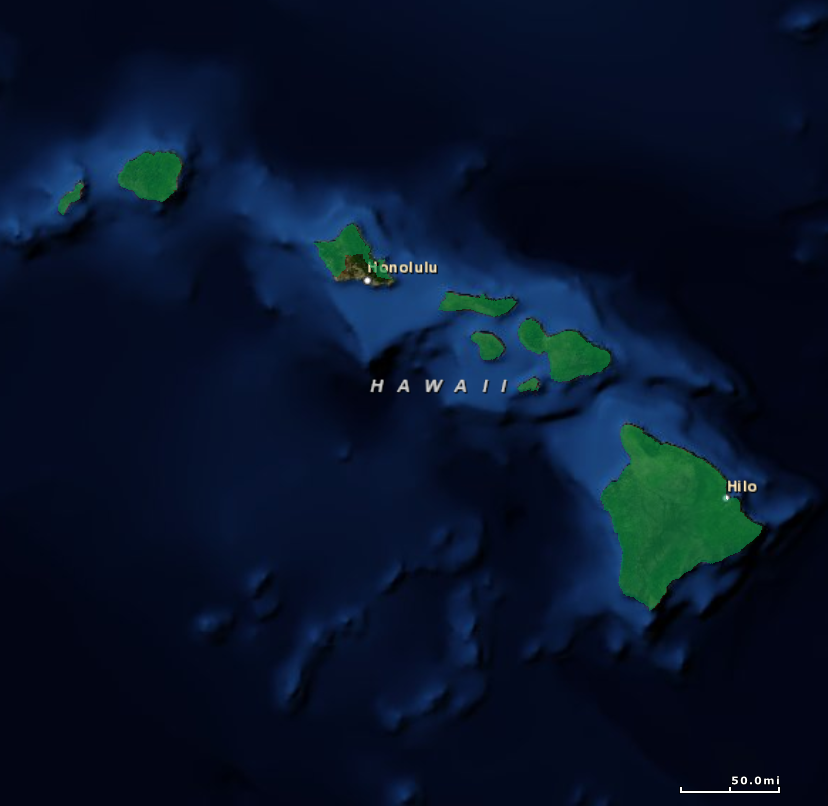
2013–2023

== See also ==
- Hawaii's congressional districts
- List of United States congressional districts
