= 2010 United States House of Representatives elections in Hawaii =

- November 2, 2010

All 2 Hawaii seats to the United States House of Representatives
	Majority party	Minority party
Party	Democratic	Republican
Last election	2	0
Seats before	1	1
Seats won	2	0
Seat change	▲1	▼1
Popular vote	226,430	129,127
Percentage	62.88%	35.86%
Swing	▼13.70	▲16.11
- County results Democratic: 50–60% 70–80%

The 2010 congressional elections in Hawaii was held on November 2, 2010, to determine who was to represent the state of Hawaii in the United States House of Representatives for the 112th Congress from January 2011, until their terms of office expire in January 2013.

Hawaii has two seats in the House, apportioned according to the 2000 United States census. Representatives are elected for two-year terms. The election coincided with the 2010 gubernatorial election.

== Overview ==
United States House of Representatives elections in Hawaii, 2010
Party	Votes	Percentage	Seats	+/–
Democratic	226,430	62.88%	2	+1
Republican	129,127	35.86%	0	-1
Libertarian	3,254	0.90%	0	—
Independents	1,310	0.36%	0	—
Totals	360,121	100.00%	2	—

=== By district ===
Results of the 2010 United States House of Representatives elections in Hawaii by district:

District	Democratic		Republican		Others		Total		Result
District	Votes	%	Votes	%	Votes	%	Votes	%	Result
District 1	94,140	53.23%	82,723	46.77%	0	0.00%	176,863	100.0%	Democratic gain
District 2	132,290	72.19%	46,404	25.32%	4,564	2.49%	183,258	100.0%	Democratic hold
Total	226,430	62.87%	129,127	35.86%	4,564	1.27%	360,121	100.0%	

== District 1 ==
United States House of Representatives District 1
- November 2, 2010
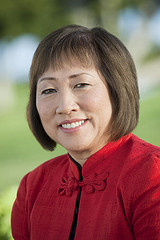

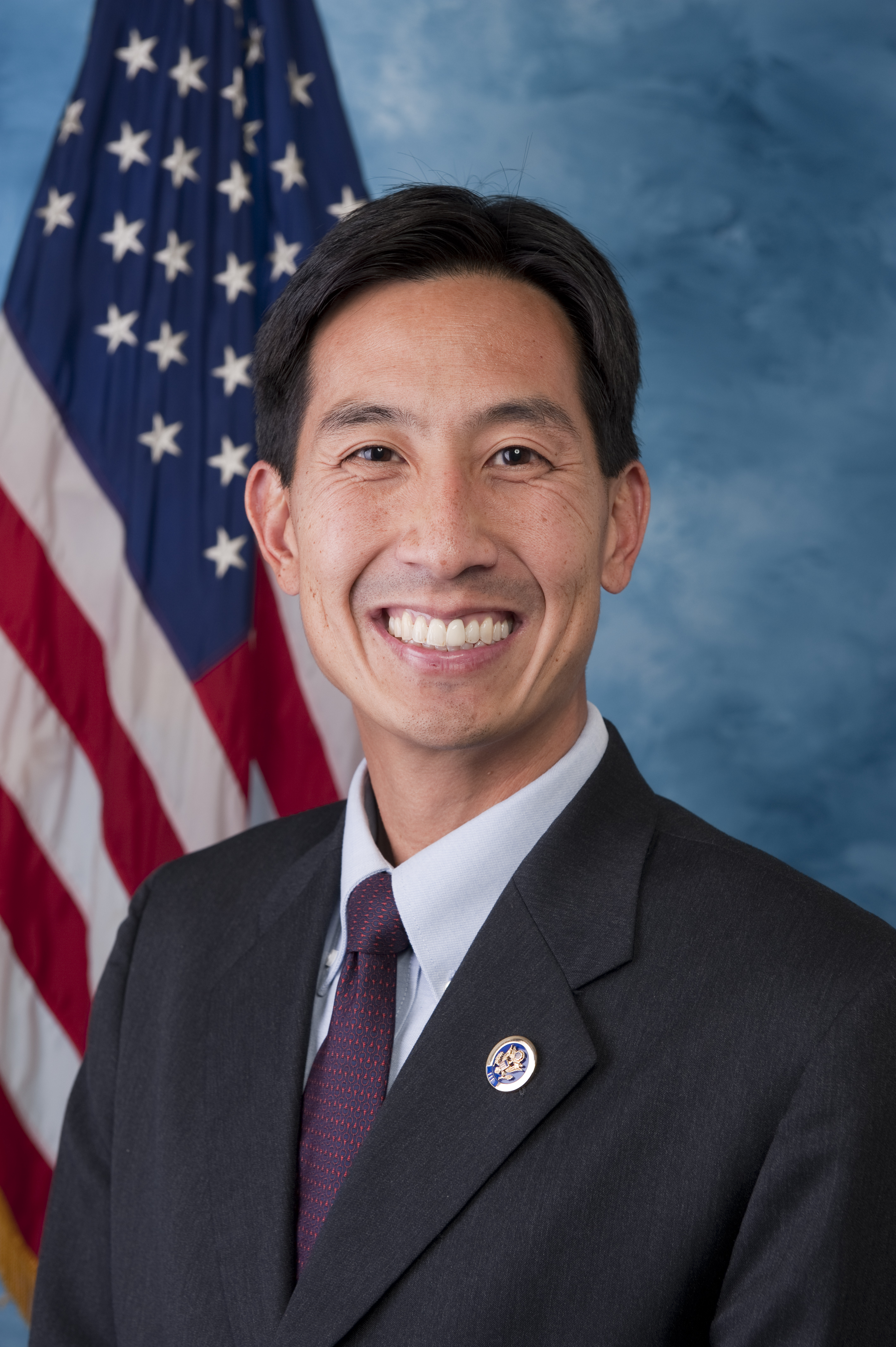
Nominee	Colleen Hanabusa	Charles Djou
Party	Democratic	Republican
Popular vote	94,140	82,723
Percentage	53.23%	46.77%
U.S. Representative before election
Charles Djou
Republican
Elected U.S. Representative
Colleen Hanabusa
Democratic

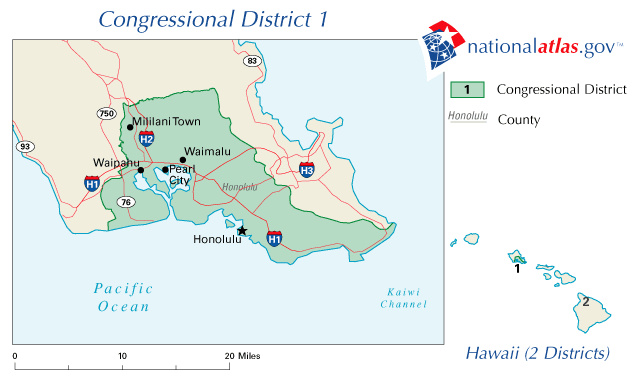
Hawaiʻi's 1st congressional district

=== Campaign ===
Republican Congressman Charles Djou was first elected in a special election in May 2010, which Republicans heralded as a "significant win" and to which DNC chairman Tim Kaine responded, "Democrats got 60% of the vote in that race. In the November election, it will be one Democrat against one Republican, and we feel very, very confident about winning that race." In the general election, Hawaii State Senate President Colleen Hanabusa, also a candidate in the special election, emerged as the Democratic nominee. Though former congressman Ed Case, the other Democratic candidate in the special election, was speculated to run again in November, he ultimately decided against it. In the general election, both parties heavily invested in taking the seat, and polls indicated that the race was close up until election day. On election day, however, Hanabusa edged out Djou by a surprising large six point margin of victory and was sent to Congress for her first term.

=== Polling ===
Poll source	Date(s) administered	Sample size	Margin of error	Charles Djou (R)	Colleen Hanabusa (D)	Other	Undecided
Aloha Vote/Merriman River Group	October 23, 2010	620	±3.9%	45.3%	49.5%	–	–
Honolulu Star-Advertiser/Ward Research Inc.	October 12–19, 2010	399	±4.9%	48%	45%	1%	6%
OnMessage Inc.	October 17–18, 2010	--	--	51%	45%	–	–
ccAdvertising	mid-October, 2010	2,747	±3%	44%	35%	--	--
The Hill/ANGA	October 2–7, 2010	406	±4.9%	45%	41%	--	12%
Global Strategy Group†	October 4–6, 2010	400	--	44%	48%	--	--
Public Policy Polling	October 2–3, 2010	643	±3.9%	47%	48%	--	5%
Tarrance Group†	July 26–27, 2010	400	±4.9%	50%	42%	--	--

†Internal poll (Tarrance Group for Djou and Global Strategy Group for Hanabusa)

==== Predictions ====
Source	Ranking	As of
The Cook Political Report	Tossup	November 1, 2010
Rothenberg	Tossup	November 1, 2010
Sabato's Crystal Ball	Lean R	November 1, 2010
RCP	Tossup	November 1, 2010
CQ Politics	Tossup	October 28, 2010
New York Times	Tossup	November 1, 2010
FiveThirtyEight	Lean D (flip)	November 1, 2010

=== Results ===
Hawaii's 1st congressional district election, 2010
Party	Candidate	Votes	%
Democratic	Colleen Hanabusa	94,140	53.23
Republican	Charles Djou (incumbent)	82,723	46.77
Total votes		176,863	100.00
Democratic gain from Republican			

== District 2 ==
United States House of Representatives District 2
- November 4, 2010
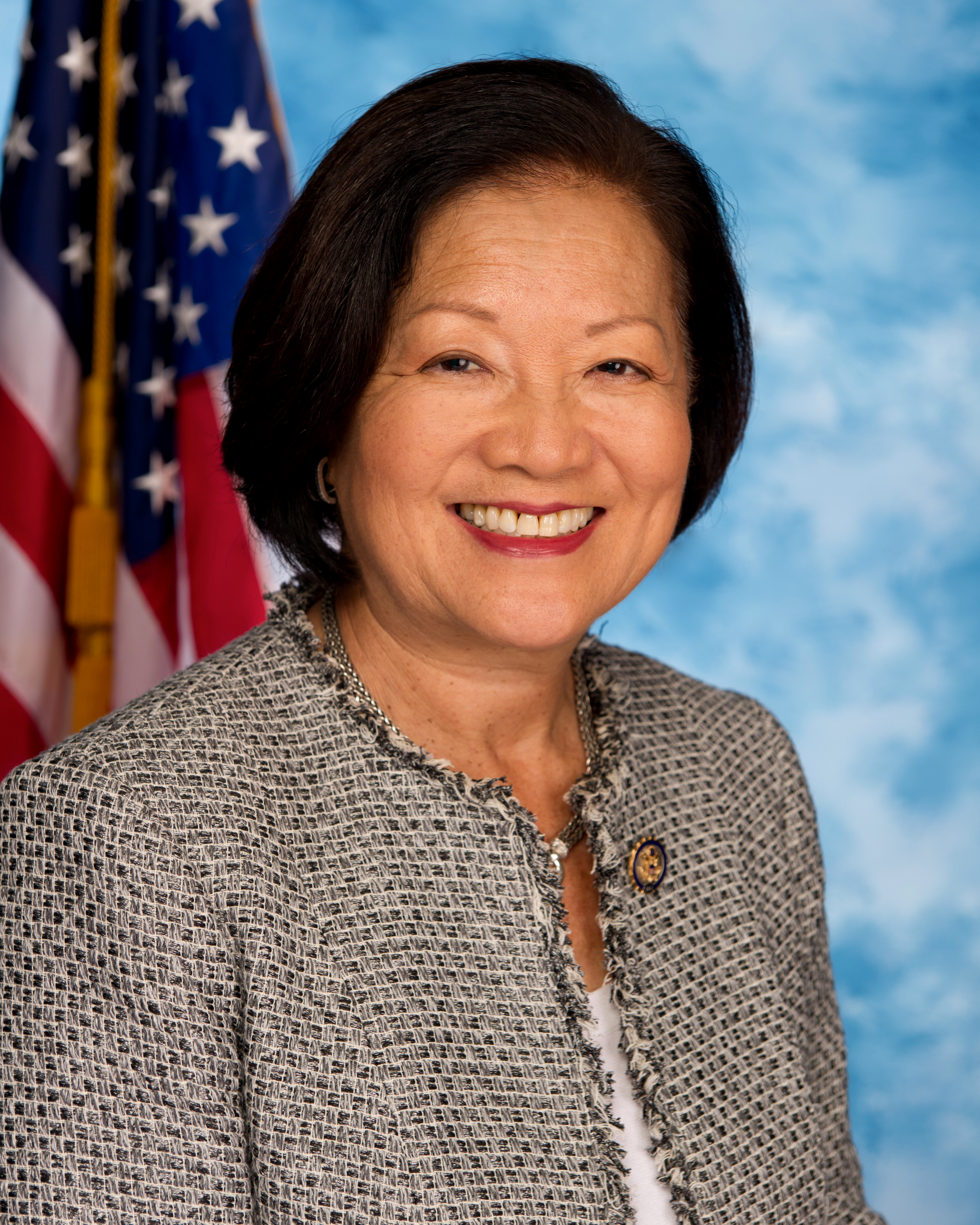

Nominee	Mazie Hirono	John Willoughby
Party	Democratic	Republican
Popular vote	132,290	46,404
Percentage	74.03%	25.96%
U.S. Representative before election
Mazie Hirono
Democratic
Elected U.S. Representative
Mazie Hirono
Democratic

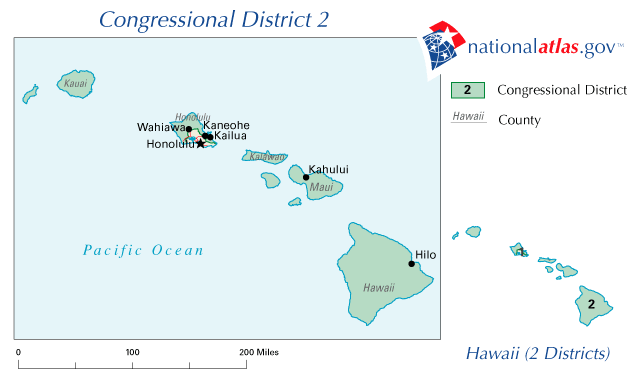
Hawaiʻi's 2nd congressional district

=== Campaign ===
This liberal district that encompasses all of Hawaii but Honolulu, has been represented by Democratic congresswoman Mazie Hirono since she was first elected in 2006. This year, Congresswoman Hirono faced Republican challenger and Tea Party activist John Willoughby in the general election. Though Willoughby attacked Hirono for refusing to debate, polls indicated that the Congresswoman was a shoo-in for re-election.

==== Predictions ====
Source	Ranking	As of
The Cook Political Report	Safe D	November 1, 2010
Rothenberg	Safe D	November 1, 2010
Sabato's Crystal Ball	Safe D	November 1, 2010
RCP	Safe D	November 1, 2010
CQ Politics	Safe D	October 28, 2010
New York Times	Safe D	November 1, 2010
FiveThirtyEight	Safe D	November 1, 2010

=== Results ===
Hawaii's 2nd congressional district election, 2010
Party	Candidate	Votes	%
Democratic	Mazie Hirono (incumbent)	132,290	72.19
Republican	John W. Willoughby	46,404	25.32
Libertarian	Pat Brock	3,254	1.78
Independent	Andrew Von Sonn	1,310	0.71
Total votes		183,258	100.00
Democratic hold			
