= 2002 United States House of Representatives elections in Hawaii =

- November 5, 2002

All 2 Hawaii seats to the United States House of Representatives
	Majority party	Minority party
Party	Democratic	Republican
Last election	2	0
Seats won	2	0
Seat change	Steady	Steady
Popular vote	232,344	116,693
Percentage	64.54%	32.42%
Swing	▼0.49%	▲0.16%
- County results Democratic: 50–60% 60–70%

The 2002 House elections in Hawaii occurred on November 5, 2002, to elect the members of the State of Hawaii's delegation to the United States House of Representatives. Hawaii had two seats in the House, apportioned according to the 2000 United States census.

These elections were held concurrently with the United States Senate elections of 2002, the United States House elections in other states, and various state and local elections.

Of Hawaii's Congressional districts, the race in the 2nd district received the most attention. Representative Patsy Mink, despite her death following renomination, was posthumously re-elected, thus triggering a subsequent special election to fill the vacancy.

== Overview ==
United States House of Representatives elections in Hawaii, 2002
Party	Votes	Percentage	Seats	+/–
Democratic	232,344	64.54%	2	—
Republican	116,693	32.42%	0	—
Libertarian	8,747	2.43%	0	—
Natural Law	2,200	.61%	0	—
Totals	359,984	100.00%	2	—

== Results ==
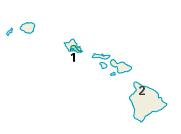
Hawaii's congressional districts for the 2002 elections

District	Incumbent	Party	First elected	Result	Candidates
Hawaii 1	Neil Abercrombie	Democratic	1986 (Special); 1988 (Lost renomination); 1990	Re-elected	Neil Abercrombie (D) 72.85% Mark Terry (R) 24.92% James Bracken (L) 2.23%
Hawaii 2	Patsy Mink †	Democratic	1964; 1976 (Retired); 1990	Re-elected	Patsy Mink (D) 56.16% Bob McDermott (R) 39.98% Jeff Mallan (L) 2.63% Nicholas Bedworth (NL) 1.23%

== District 1 ==
2002 Hawaii's 1st congressional district election
- November 5, 2002
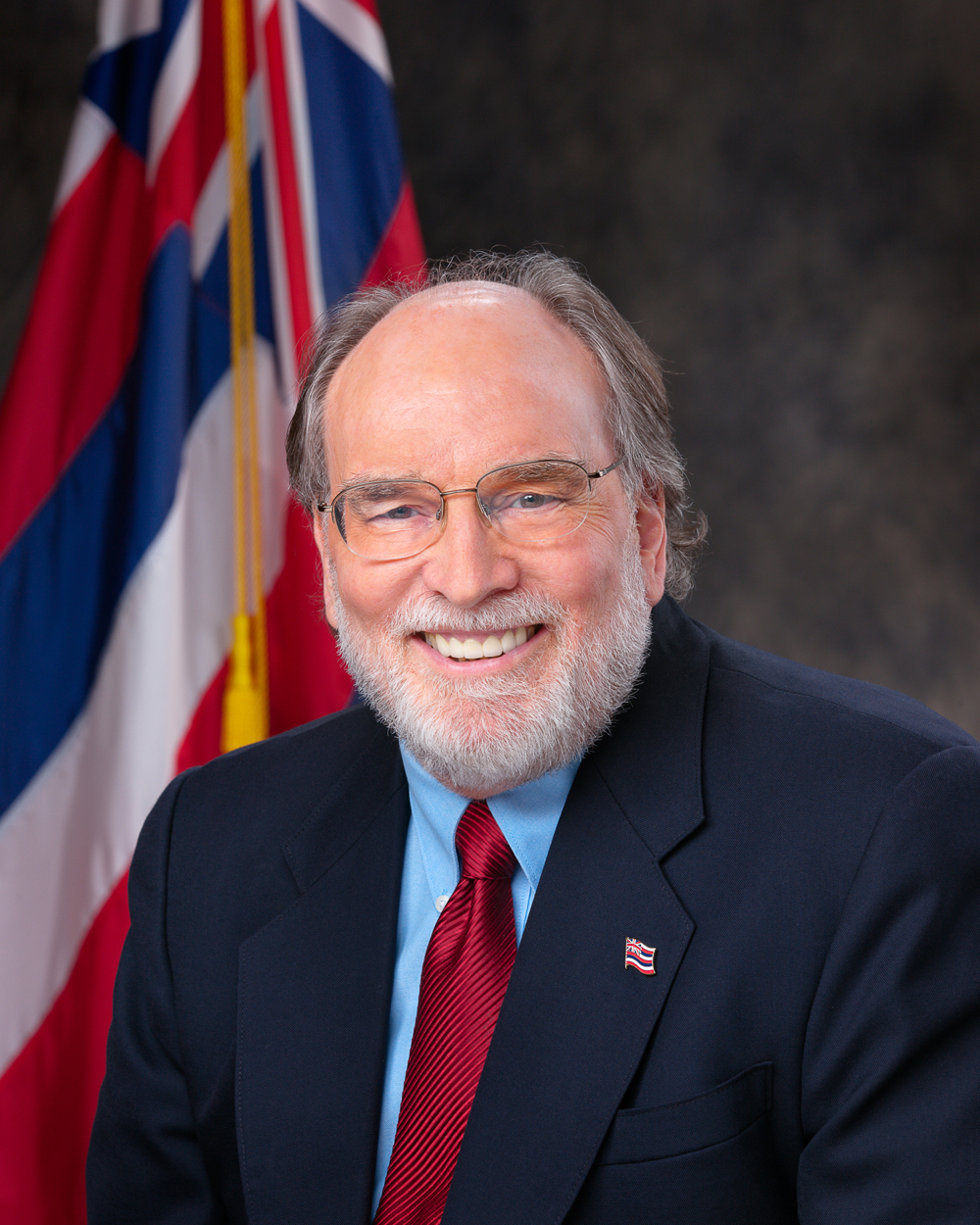

Nominee	Neil Abercrombie	Mark Terry
Party	Democratic	Republican
Popular vote	131,673	45,032
Percentage	72.9%	24.9%
U.S. Representative before election
Neil Abercrombie
Democratic
Elected U.S. Representative
Neil Abercrombie
Democratic

Incumbent Democrat Neil Abercrombie, who was first elected in 1986, ran for re-election. Abercrombie was re-elected with 72.9% of the vote.

=== General election ===
==== Results ====
Hawaii's 1st congressional district election, 2002
Party	Candidate	Votes	%
Democratic	Neil Abercrombie (incumbent)	131,673	72.9
Republican	Mark Terry	45,032	24.9
Libertarian	James H. Bracken	4,028	2.2
Total votes		180,733	100.0
Democratic hold			

== District 2 ==
2002 Hawaii's 2nd congressional district election
- November 5, 2002
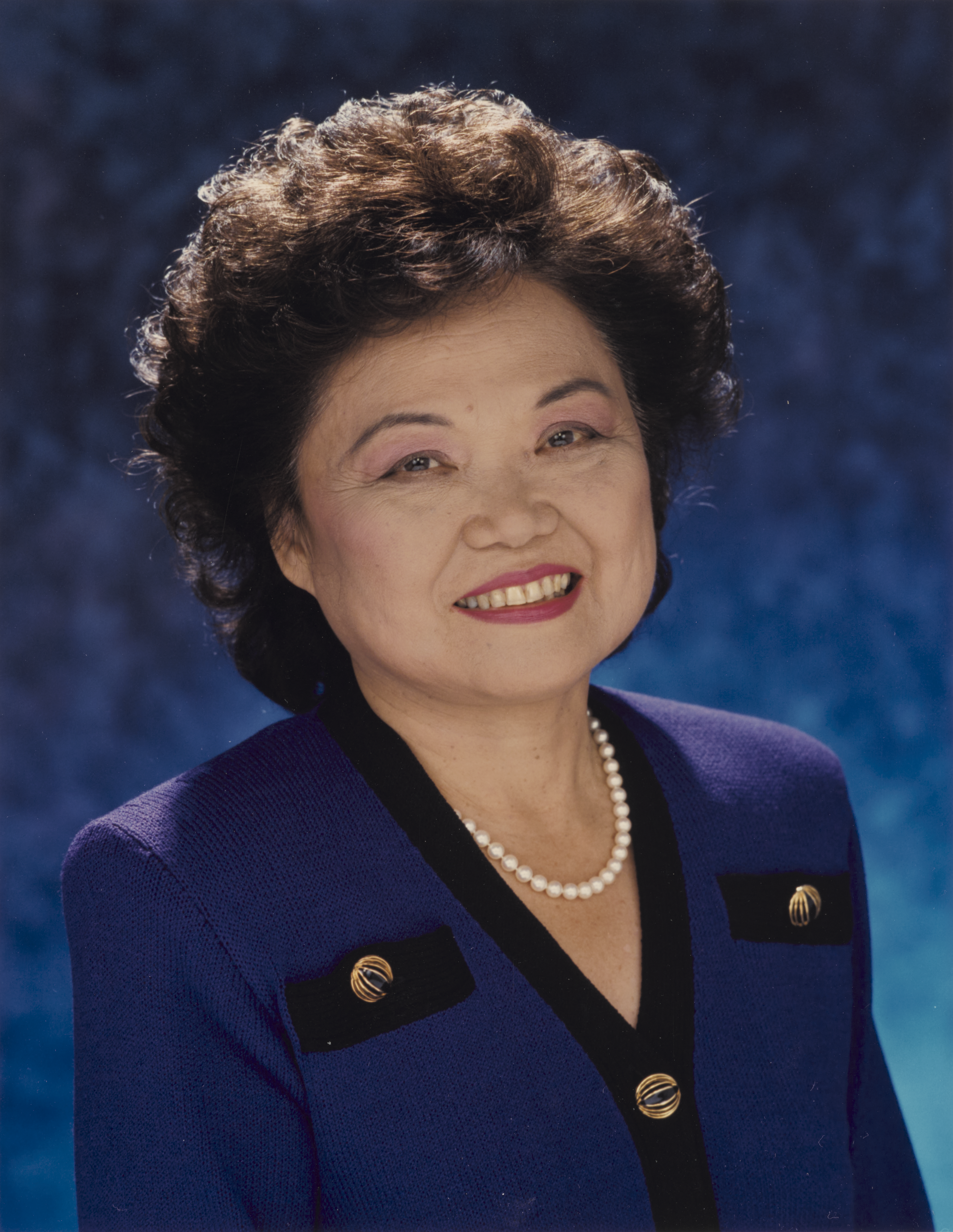

Nominee	Patsy Mink	Bob McDermott
Party	Democratic	Republican
Popular vote	100,671	71,661
Percentage	56.2%	40.0%
U.S. Representative before election
Patsy Mink
Democratic
Elected U.S. Representative
Ed Case
Democratic

Incumbent Democrat Patsy Mink died on September 28, 2002, but remained on the ballot under Hawaii law and was posthumously re-elected with 56.2% of the vote. Ed Case won the special elections held on November 30, 2002, and January 4, 2003, to fill the vacancy.

=== General election ===
==== Results ====
Hawaii's 2nd congressional district election, 2002
Party	Candidate	Votes	%
Democratic	Patsy Mink (incumbent)	100,671	56.2
Republican	Bob McDermott	71,661	40.0
Libertarian	Jeff Mallan	4,719	2.6
Natural Law	Nicholas Bedworth	2,200	1.2
Total votes		179,251	100.0
Democratic hold			
