= 2012 United States presidential election in Hawaii =

- November 6, 2012

Nominee	Barack Obama	Mitt Romney
Party	Democratic	Republican
Home state	Illinois	Massachusetts
Running mate	Joe Biden	Paul Ryan
Electoral vote	4	0
Popular vote	306,658	121,015
Percentage	70.55%	27.84%

Obama
40–50%
50–60%
60–70%
70–80%
80–90%
90–100%
Romney
60–70%
No Votes
President before election
Barack Obama
Democratic
Elected President
Barack Obama
Democratic

The 2012 United States presidential election in Hawaii took place on November 6, 2012, as part of the 2012 United States presidential election in which all 50 states plus the District of Columbia participated. Hawaii voters chose four electors to represent them in the Electoral College via a popular vote pitting incumbent Democratic President Barack Obama and his running mate, Vice President Joe Biden, against Republican challenger and former Massachusetts Governor Mitt Romney and his running mate, Congressman Paul Ryan.

Prior to the election, leading news organizations considered this a state Obama would win, or otherwise considered as a safe blue state. The Hawaiian-born president handily won the state's four electoral votes by a wide 42.71% margin of victory. As of the 2024 presidential election, this is the last time a Democrat would win 70% or more of the vote in any state in a presidential race.

== Caucuses ==
=== Democratic caucuses ===
2012 Hawaii Democratic caucuses
- March 7, 2012

Candidate	Barack Obama	Uncommitted
Home state	Illinois
Delegate count	35	0
Popular vote	1,316	42
Percentage	96.91%	3.09%

The 2012 Hawaii Democratic caucuses took place on March 7, 2012.

Hawaii Democratic caucuses, 2012
Candidate	Votes	Percentage	Delegates
Barack Obama (incumbent)	1,316	96.91%	35
Uncommitted	42	3.09%	0
Total:	1,358	100%	35

=== Republican caucuses ===
2012 Hawaii Republican caucuses
- March 13, 2012

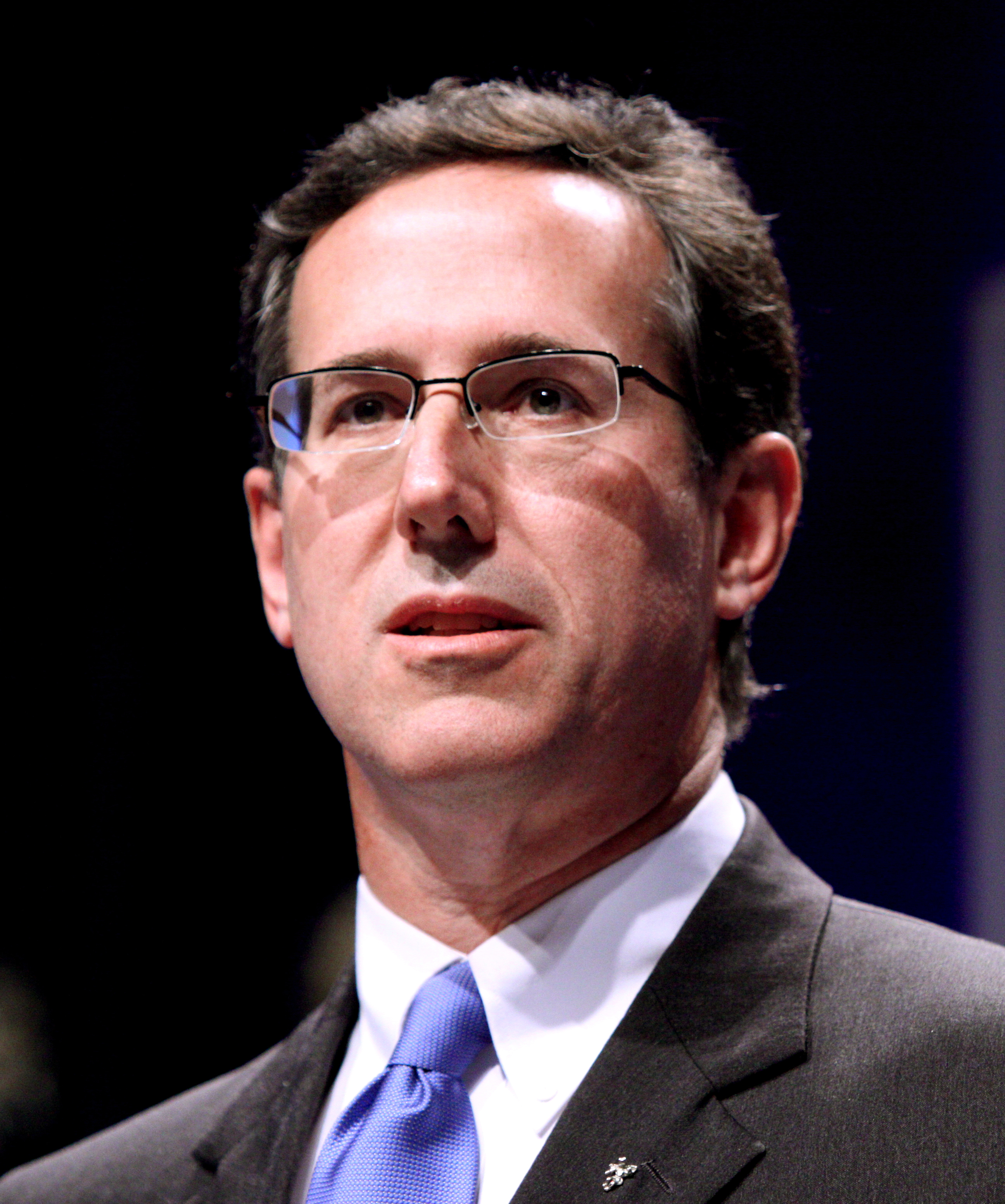

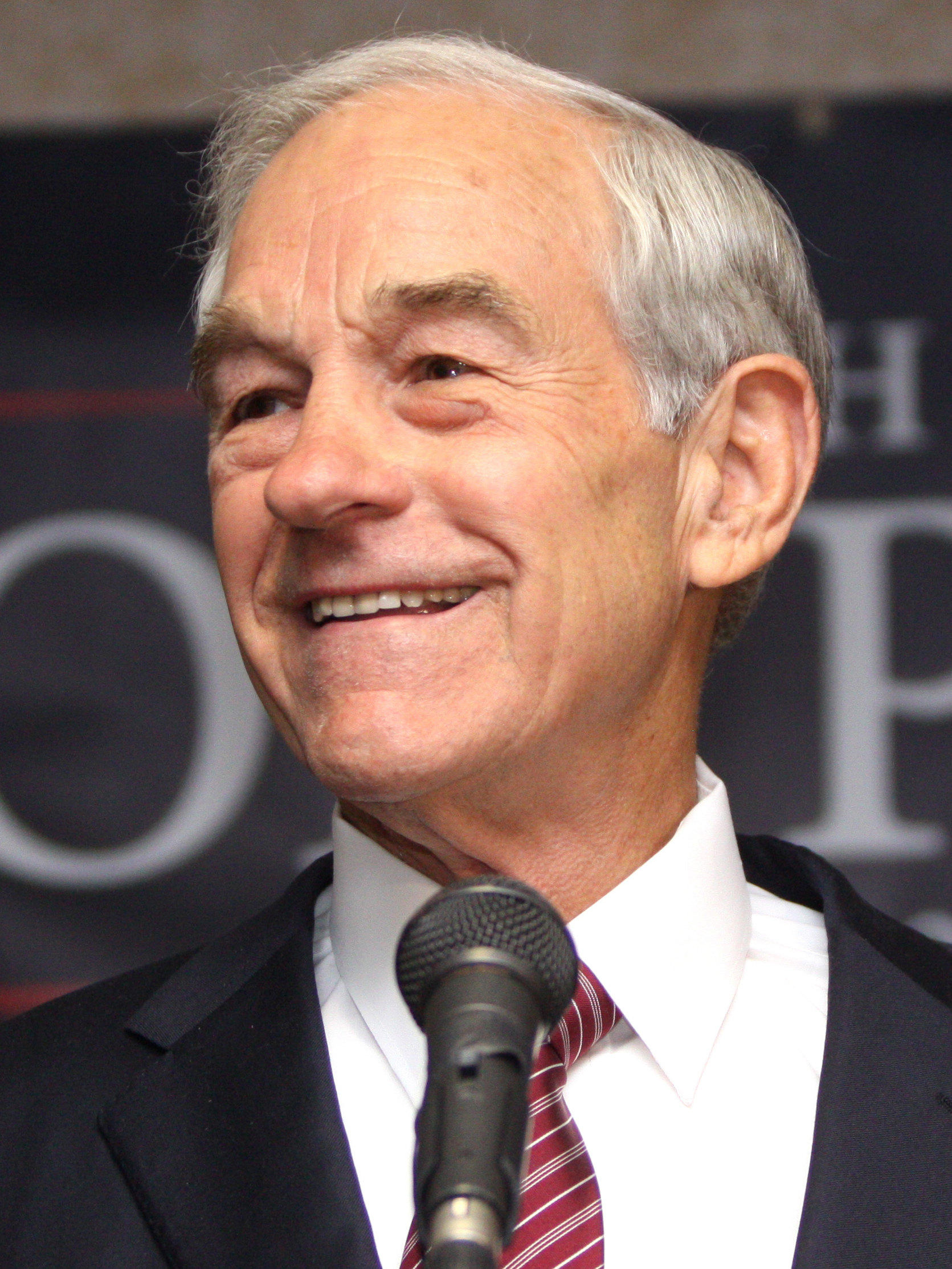

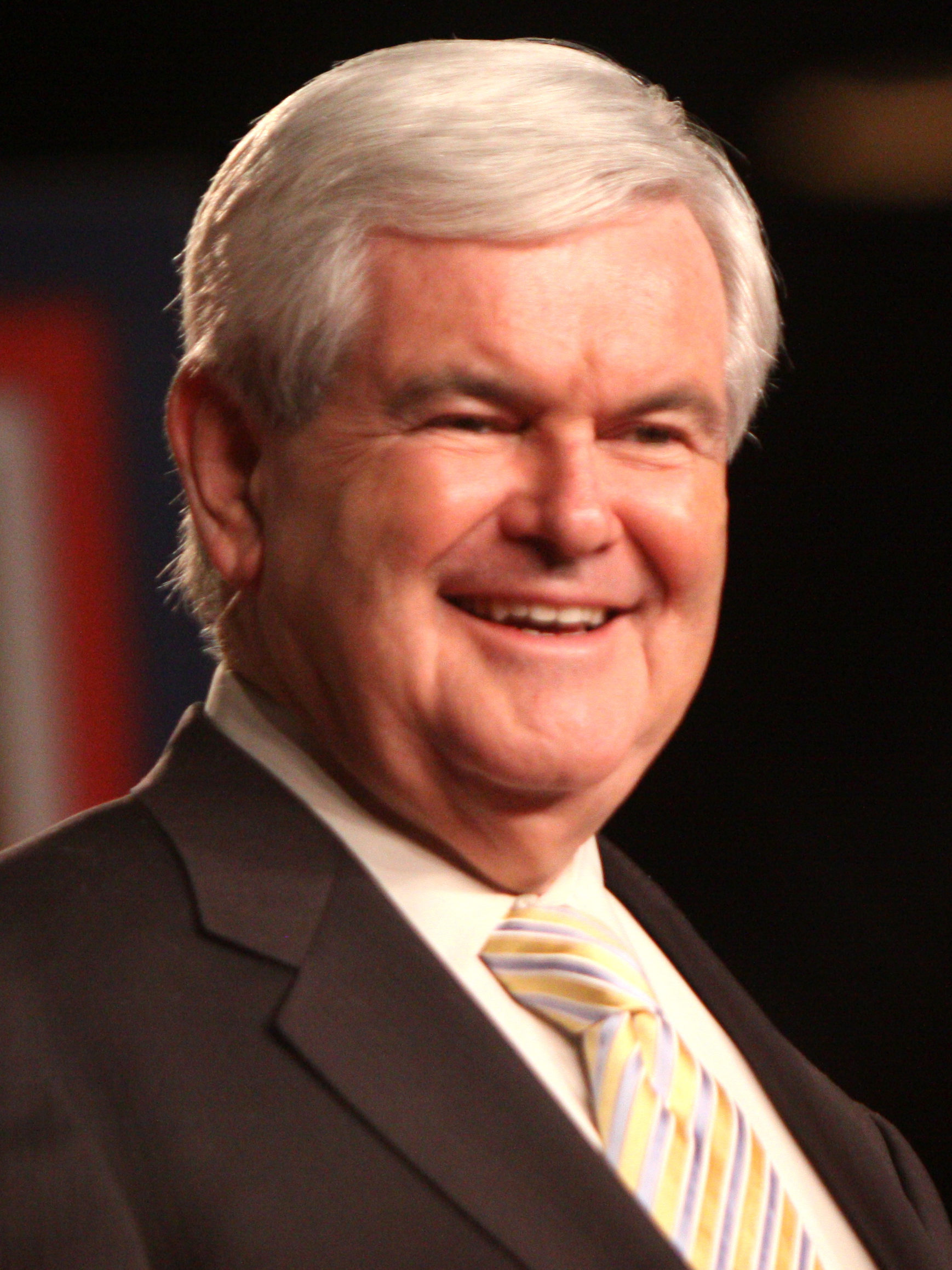
Candidate	Mitt Romney	Rick Santorum
Home state	Massachusetts	Pennsylvania
Delegate count	9	4
Popular vote	4,548	2,589
Percentage	44.47%	25.31%
Candidate	Ron Paul	Newt Gingrich
Home state	Texas	Georgia
Delegate count	3	0
Popular vote	1,975	1,116
Percentage	19.31%	10.91%
- Hawaii results by county Mitt Romney Ron Paul

The 2012 Hawaii Republican caucuses took place on March 13, 2012.

Hawaii Republican caucuses, 2012
Candidate	Votes	Percentage	Delegates
Mitt Romney	4,548	44.47%	9
Rick Santorum	2,589	25.31%	5
Ron Paul	1,975	19.31%	3
Newt Gingrich	1,116	10.91%	0
Unprojected delegates:			3
Total:	10,228	100%	20

Certified results doesn't include 858 outstanding votes (write-ins and provisional ballots).

== General election ==
=== Candidate ballot access ===
- Mitt Romney/Paul Ryan, Republican
- Barack Obama/Joseph Biden, Democratic
- Gary Johnson/James P. Gray, Libertarian
- Jill Stein/Cheri Honkala, Green

=== Predictions ===
Source	Ranking	As of
Huffington Post	Safe D	November 6, 2012
CNN	Safe D	November 6, 2012
New York Times	Safe D	November 6, 2012
Washington Post	Safe D	November 6, 2012
RealClearPolitics	Solid D	November 6, 2012
Sabato's Crystal Ball	Solid D	November 5, 2012
FiveThirtyEight	Solid D	November 6, 2012

=== Results ===
State Senate district results

2012 United States presidential election in Hawaii
Party	Candidate	Running mate	Votes	Percentage	Electoral votes
Democratic	Barack Obama (incumbent)	Joe Biden (incumbent)	306,658	70.55%	4
Republican	Mitt Romney	Paul Ryan	121,015	27.84%	0
Libertarian	Gary Johnson	Jim Gray	3,840	0.88%	0
Green	Jill Stein	Cheri Honkala	3,184	0.73%	0
Totals			434,697	100.00%	4
Voter turnout (registered voters)					61.9%

==== By county ====

County	Barack Obama Democratic		Mitt Romney Republican		Various candidates Other parties		Margin		Total votes cast
County	#	%	#	%	#	%	#	%	Total votes cast
Hawaii	47,224	74.42%	14,753	23.25%	1,477	2.33%	32,471	51.17%	63,454
Honolulu	204,349	68.86%	88,461	29.81%	3,932	1.33%	115,888	39.05%	296,742
Kalawao	25	92.59%	2	7.41%	0	0.00%	23	85.18%	27
Kauaʻi	18,641	73.47%	6,121	24.13%	610	2.40%	12,520	49.34%	25,372
Maui	36,052	74.10%	11,602	23.85%	999	2.05%	24,450	50.25%	48,653
Totals	306,658	70.55%	121,015	27.84%	7,024	1.61%	185,643	42.71%	434,697

==== By congressional district ====
Obama won both congressional districts.

District	Obama	Romney	Representative
1st	69.7%	29.02%	Colleen Hanabusa
2nd	71.38%	26.67%	Tulsi Gabbard

== See also ==
- 2012 Republican Party presidential debates and forums
- 2012 Republican Party presidential primaries
- Results of the 2012 Republican Party presidential primaries
- Hawaii Republican Party
