= 2004 United States House of Representatives elections in Hawaii =

- November 2, 2004

All 2 Hawaii seats to the United States House of Representatives
	Majority party	Minority party
Party	Democratic	Republican
Last election	2	0
Seats won	2	0
Seat change	Steady	Steady
Popular vote	261,884	148,443
Percentage	62.87%	35.64%
Swing	▼1.67%	▲3.22%
- County results Democratic: 60–70%

The 2004 House elections in Hawaii occurred on November 2, 2004, to elect the members of the State of Hawaii's delegation to the United States House of Representatives. Hawaii had two seats in the House, apportioned according to the 2000 United States census.

These elections were held concurrently with the United States presidential election of 2004, United States Senate elections of 2004 (including one in Hawaii), the United States House elections in other states, and various state and local elections.

== Overview ==
United States House of Representatives elections in Hawaii, 2004
Party	Votes	Percentage	Seats	+/–
Democratic	261,884	62.87%	2	—
Republican	148,443	35.64%	0	—
Libertarian	6,243	1.5%	0	—
Totals	416,570	100.00%	2	—

== Results ==
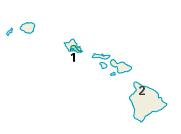
Hawaii congressional districts in the 2004 elections

District	Incumbent	Party	First elected	Result	Candidates
Hawaii 1	Neil Abercrombie	Democratic	1986 (Special); 1988 (Lost renomination); 1990	Re-elected	Neil Abercrombie (D) 63.0% Dalton Tanonaka (R) 34.0% Elyssa Young (L) 3.0%
Hawaii 2	Ed Case	Democratic	2002 (Special)	Re-elected	Ed Case (D) 62.8% Mike Gabbard (R) 37.2%

== District 1 ==
2004 Hawaii's 1st congressional district election
- November 2, 2004
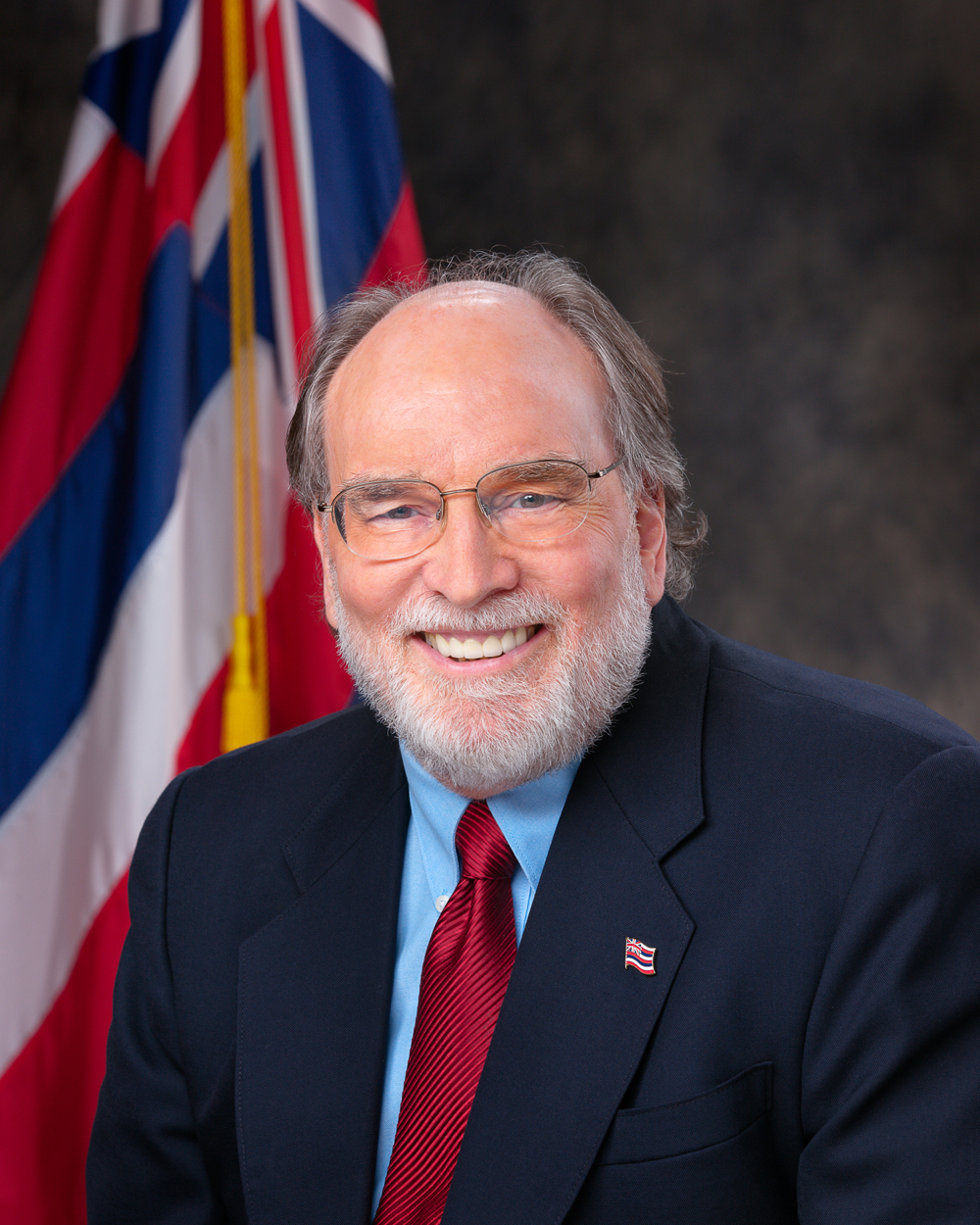

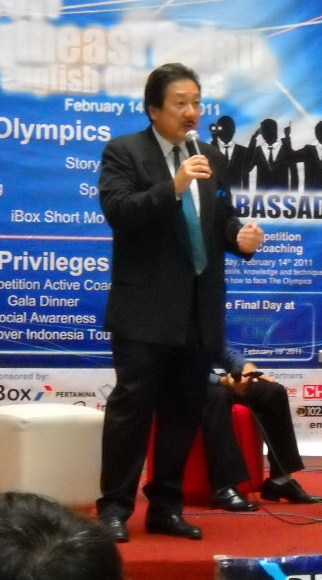
Nominee	Neil Abercrombie	Dalton Tanonaka
Party	Democratic	Republican
Popular vote	128,567	69,371
Percentage	63.0%	34.0%
U.S. Representative before election
Neil Abercrombie
Democratic
Elected U.S. Representative
Neil Abercrombie
Democratic

Incumbent Democrat Neil Abercrombie, who was first elected in 1986, ran for re-election. Abercrombie was re-elected with 63.0% of the vote.

=== General election ===
==== Results ====
Hawaii's 1st congressional district election, 2004
Party	Candidate	Votes	%
Democratic	Neil Abercrombie (incumbent)	128,567	63.0
Republican	Dalton Tanonaka	69,371	34.0
Libertarian	Elyssa Young	6,243	3.1
Total votes		204,181	100.0
Democratic hold			

== District 2 ==
2004 Hawaii's 2nd congressional district election
- November 2, 2004
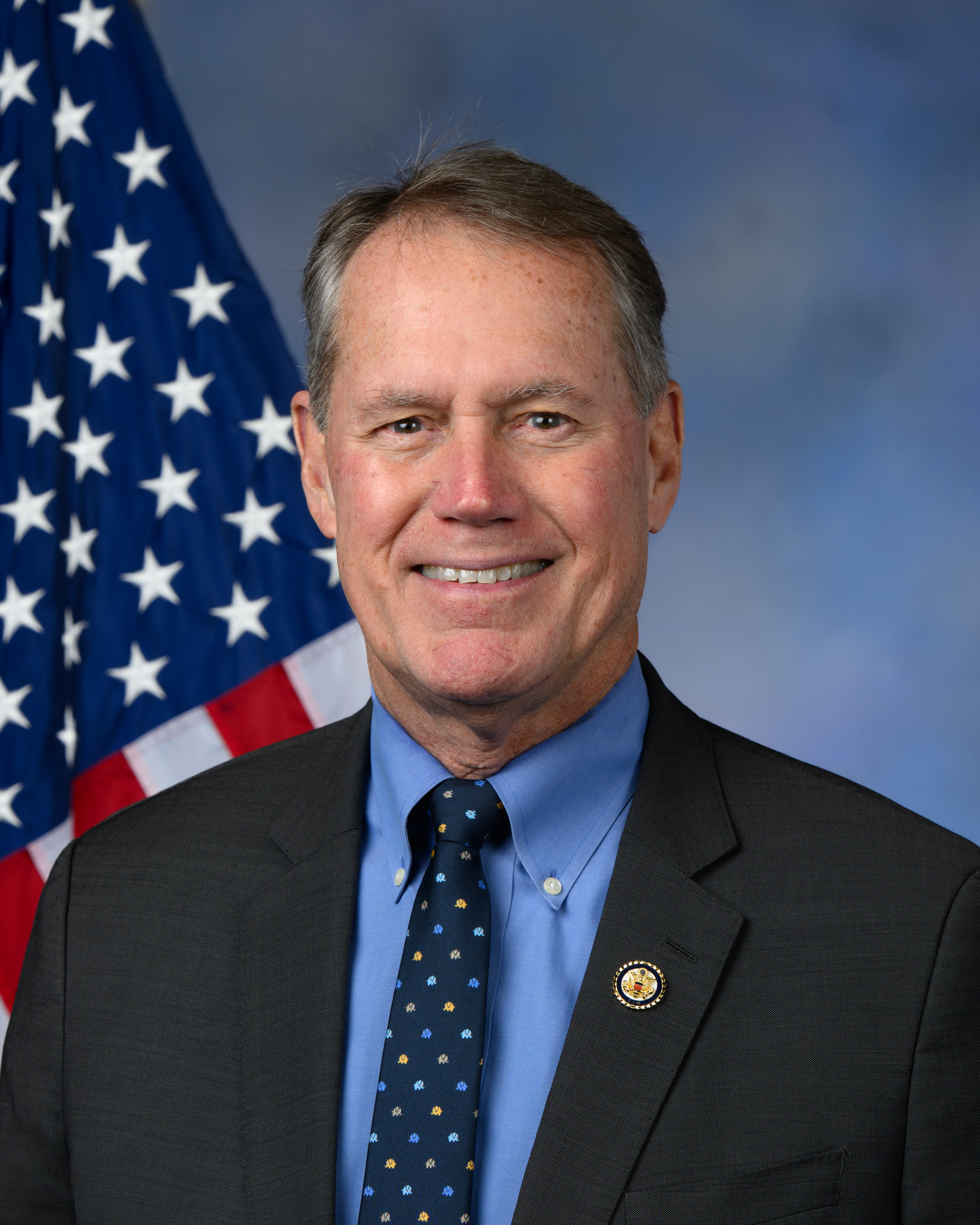

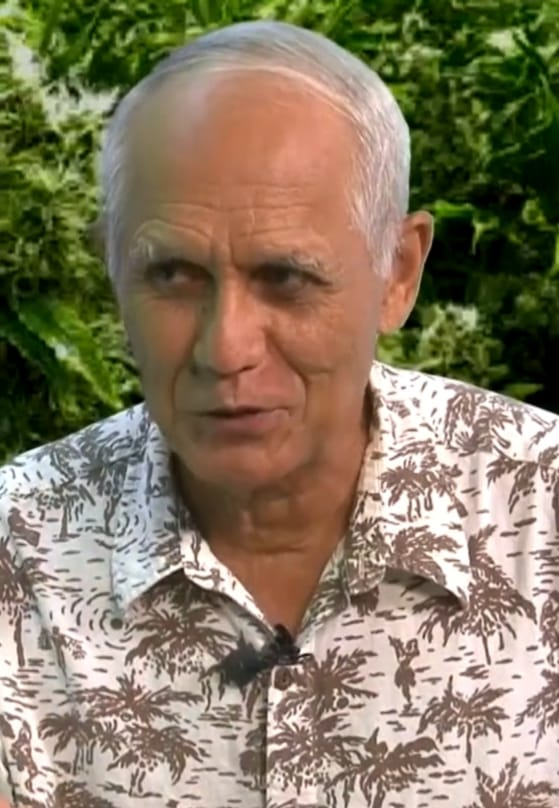
Nominee	Ed Case	Mike Gabbard
Party	Democratic	Republican
Popular vote	133,317	79,072
Percentage	62.8%	37.2%
U.S. Representative before election
Ed Case
Democratic
Elected U.S. Representative
Ed Case
Democratic

Incumbent Democrat Ed Case, who was first elected in 2002, ran for re-election. Case was re-elected with 62.8% of the vote.

=== General election ===
==== Results ====
Hawaii's 2nd congressional district election, 2004
Party	Candidate	Votes	%
Democratic	Ed Case (incumbent)	133,317	62.8
Republican	Mike Gabbard	79,072	37.2
Total votes		212,389	100.0
Democratic hold			
