= 2018 United States Senate election in Hawaii =

- November 6, 2018
- Turnout: 51.32% ▲
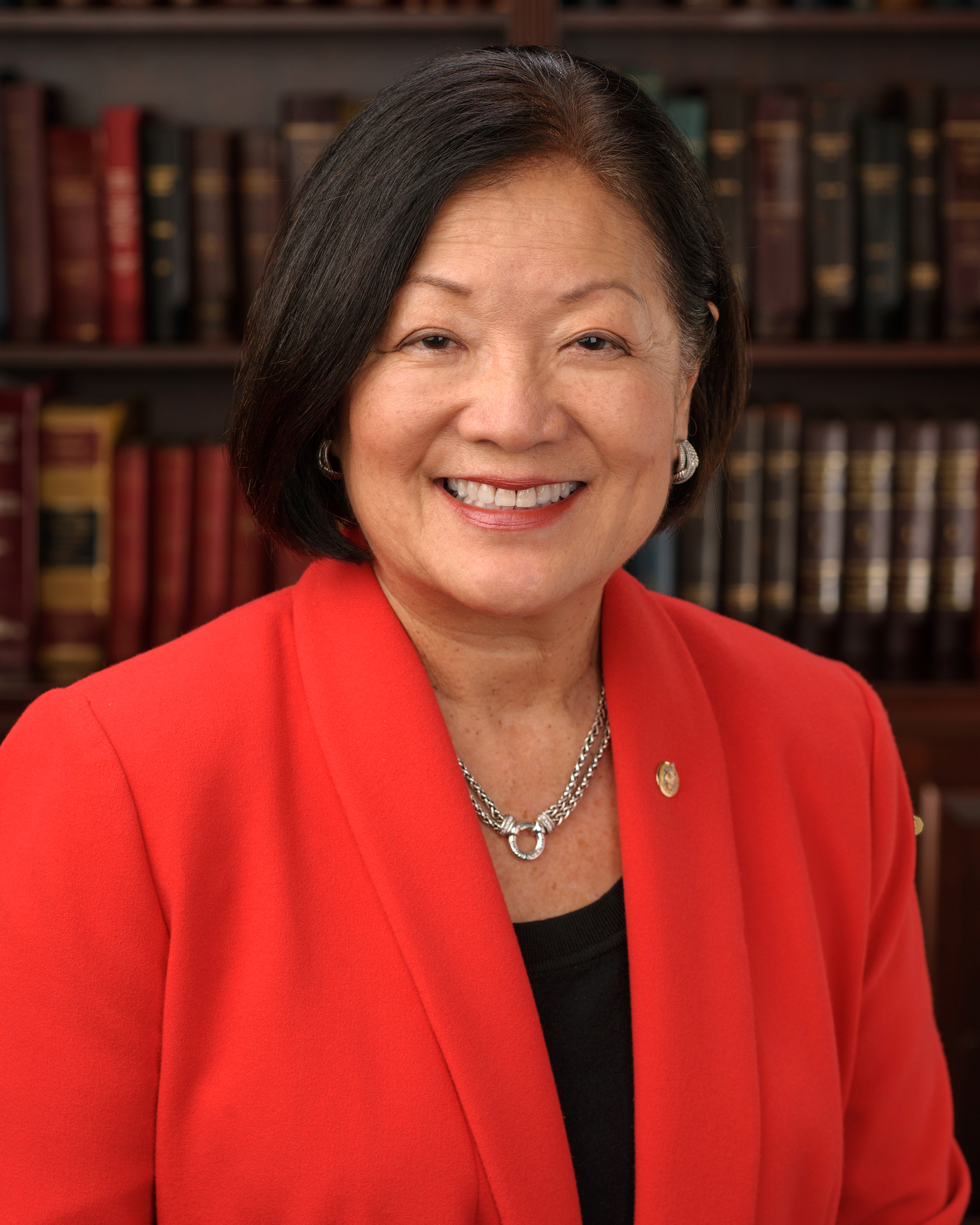

Nominee	Mazie Hirono	Ron Curtis
Party	Democratic	Republican
Popular vote	276,316	112,035
Percentage	71.15%	28.85%
- Hirono: 50–60% 60–70% 70–80% 80–90% >90% Curtis: 50–60% 60–70% No votes
U.S. senator before election
Mazie Hirono
Democratic
Elected U.S. Senator
Mazie Hirono
Democratic

The 2018 United States Senate election in Hawaii was held on November 6, 2018, to elect a member of the United States Senate to represent the state of Hawaii. Democratic incumbent Mazie Hirono won a second term, defeating Republican nominee Ron Curtis. Hirono won by the largest margin of any U.S. senate candidate in 2018.

Primary elections took place on August 11, 2018. Hirono won the Democratic nomination unopposed, while Curtis won the Republican nomination with 24% of the vote in an eight-way primary.

== Democratic primary ==
=== Background ===
Incumbent senator Hirono raised $600,000 by 2016 and was expected to run for re-election. U.S. representative Tulsi Gabbard was considered a potential candidate in the primary.

However, Gabbard did not challenge Hirono for the nomination.

=== Candidates ===
==== Nominee ====
- Mazie Hirono, incumbent U.S. senator (2013–present)

=== Endorsements ===
Mazie Hirono

U.S. senators

- Elizabeth Warren, Massachusetts (2013–present)

Organizations

- EMILY's List
- End Citizens United
- League of Conservation Voters
- MoveOn
- National Committee to Preserve Social Security and Medicare
- National Organization for Women
- Natural Resources Defense Council Action Fund
- Sierra Club

=== Results ===
Democratic primary results
Party	Candidate	Votes	%
Democratic	Mazie Hirono (incumbent)	201,679	100%
Total votes		201,679	100%

== Republican primary ==
=== Candidates ===
==== Nominee ====
- Ron Curtis, retired systems engineer

==== Eliminated in primary ====
- Consuelo Anderson, educator and businesswoman
- George L. Berish, former Honolulu Symphony board member and finance chair
- Rocky De La Fuente, businessman
- Robert C. Helsham Sr.
- Michael R. Hodgkiss
- Eddie Pirkowski, CEO
- Thomas Edward White

=== Results ===
Results by county: Curtis—30–40% Curtis—<30% White—<30% No data

Republican primary results
Party	Candidate	Votes	%
Republican	Ron Curtis	6,370	23.73%
Republican	Consuelo Anderson	5,172	19.26%
Republican	Robert C. Helsham	3,988	14.85%
Republican	Thomas E. White	3,657	13.62%
Republican	Rocky De La Fuente	3,065	11.42%
Republican	George L. Berish	1,658	6.18%
Republican	Michael R. Hodgkiss	1,576	5.87%
Republican	Eddie Pirkowski	1,358	5.06%
Total votes		26,848	100%

== Nonpartisan primary ==
=== Candidates ===
==== Declared ====
- Charles Haverty
- Matthew K. Maertens
- Arturo Pacheco Reyes (Note: Note: Arturo Pacheco Reyes did not qualify for the general election.)

=== Results ===
Results by county: Reyes—40–50% Reyes—30–40% Haverty—40–50% No data

Nonpartisan primary results
Party	Candidate	Votes	%
Nonpartisan	Arturo Pacheco Reyes	441	38.02%
Nonpartisan	Charles Haverty	416	35.86%
Nonpartisan	Matthew K. Maertens	303	26.12%
Total votes		1,160	100%

== General election ==
=== Predictions ===
Source	Ranking	As of
The Cook Political Report	Safe D	October 26, 2018
Inside Elections	Safe D	November 1, 2018
Sabato's Crystal Ball	Safe D	November 5, 2018
Daily Kos	Safe D	November 5, 2018
Fox News (Note: The Fox News Midterm Power Rankings uniquely does not contain a category for Safe/Solid races.)	Likely D	November 5, 2018
CNN	Safe D	November 5, 2018
RealClearPolitics	Safe D	November 5, 2018

=== Results ===
United States Senate election in Hawaii, 2018
Party	Candidate	Votes	%	±%
Democratic	Mazie Hirono (incumbent)	276,316	71.15%	+8.55%
Republican	Ron Curtis	112,035	28.85%	−8.55%
Total votes		388,351	100%	N/A
Democratic hold				

==== By county ====
By county

County	Mazie Hirono Democratic		Ron Curtis Republican	
County	#	%	#	%
Hawaii	43,348	74.25%	15,031	25.75%
Honolulu	176,705	68.97%	79,503	31.03%
Kauaʻi	18,510	75.15%	6,120	24.85%
Maui	37,753	76.84%	11,381	23.16%
Totals	276,316	71.15%	112,035	28.85%

==== By congressional district ====
Hirono won both congressional districts.

District	Hirono	Curtis	Representative
1st	70%	30%	Colleen Hanabusa (115th Congress)
1st	70%	30%	Ed Case (116th Congress)
2nd	72%	28%	Tulsi Gabbard
