= 2016 United States House of Representatives elections in Hawaii =

- November 8, 2016

All 2 Hawaii seats to the United States House of Representatives
| | Majority party | Minority party |
|---|---|---|
| Party | Democratic | Republican |
| Last election | 2 | 0 |
| Seats won | 2 | 0 |
| Seat change | Steady | Steady |
| Popular vote | 316,265 | 85,626 |
| Percentage | 76.60% | 20.74% |
| Swing | ▲11.24% | ▼12.60% |

Democratic
70–80%
80–90%
90–100%

The 2016 United States House of Representatives elections in Hawaii occurred on November 8, 2016. The electorate chose two candidates to act in the U.S. House, one from each of the state's two districts. Hawaii is one of 14 states that employ an open primary system, meaning voters do not have to state a party affiliation in the election. The primaries were held on August 13.

== Overview ==
Results of the 2016 United States House of Representatives elections in Hawaii by district:

| District | Democratic | | Republican | | Others | | Total | | Result |
| District | Votes | % | Votes | % | Votes | % | Votes | % | Result |
|---|---|---|---|---|---|---|---|---|---|
| District 1 | 145,417 | 71.86% | 45,958 | 22.71% | 10,982 | 5.43% | 202,357 | 100.0% | Democratic hold |
| District 2 | 170,848 | 81.16% | 39,668 | 18.84% | 0 | 0.00% | 210,516 | 100.0% | Democratic hold |
| Total | 316,265 | 76.60% | 85,626 | 20.74% | 10,982 | 2.66% | 412,873 | 100.0% | |

== District 1 ==
Hawaii's 1st congressional district election
- November 8, 2016
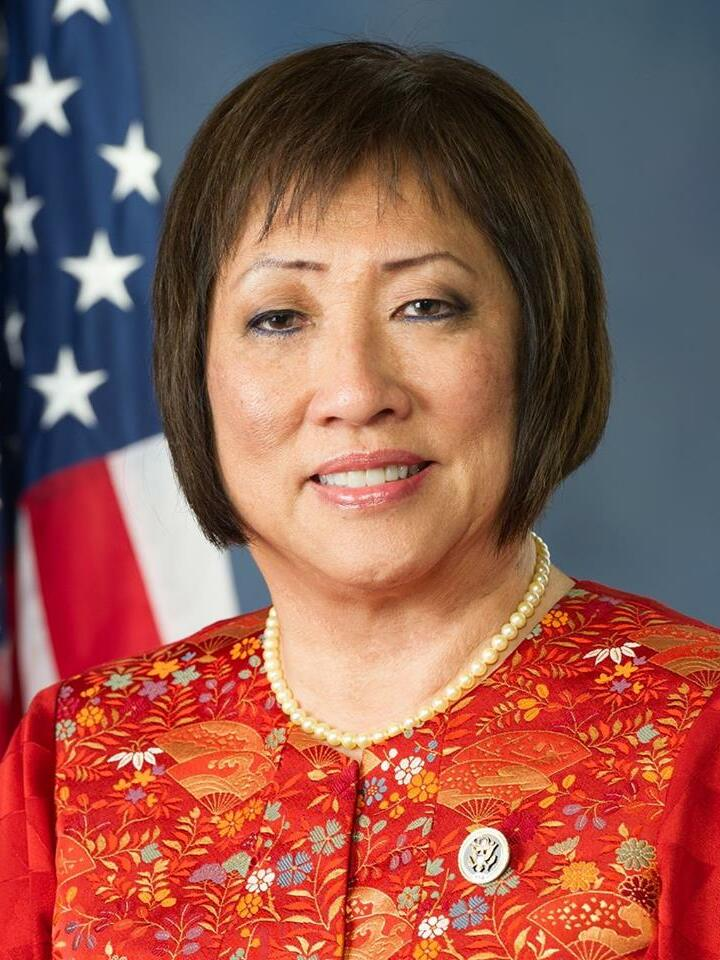

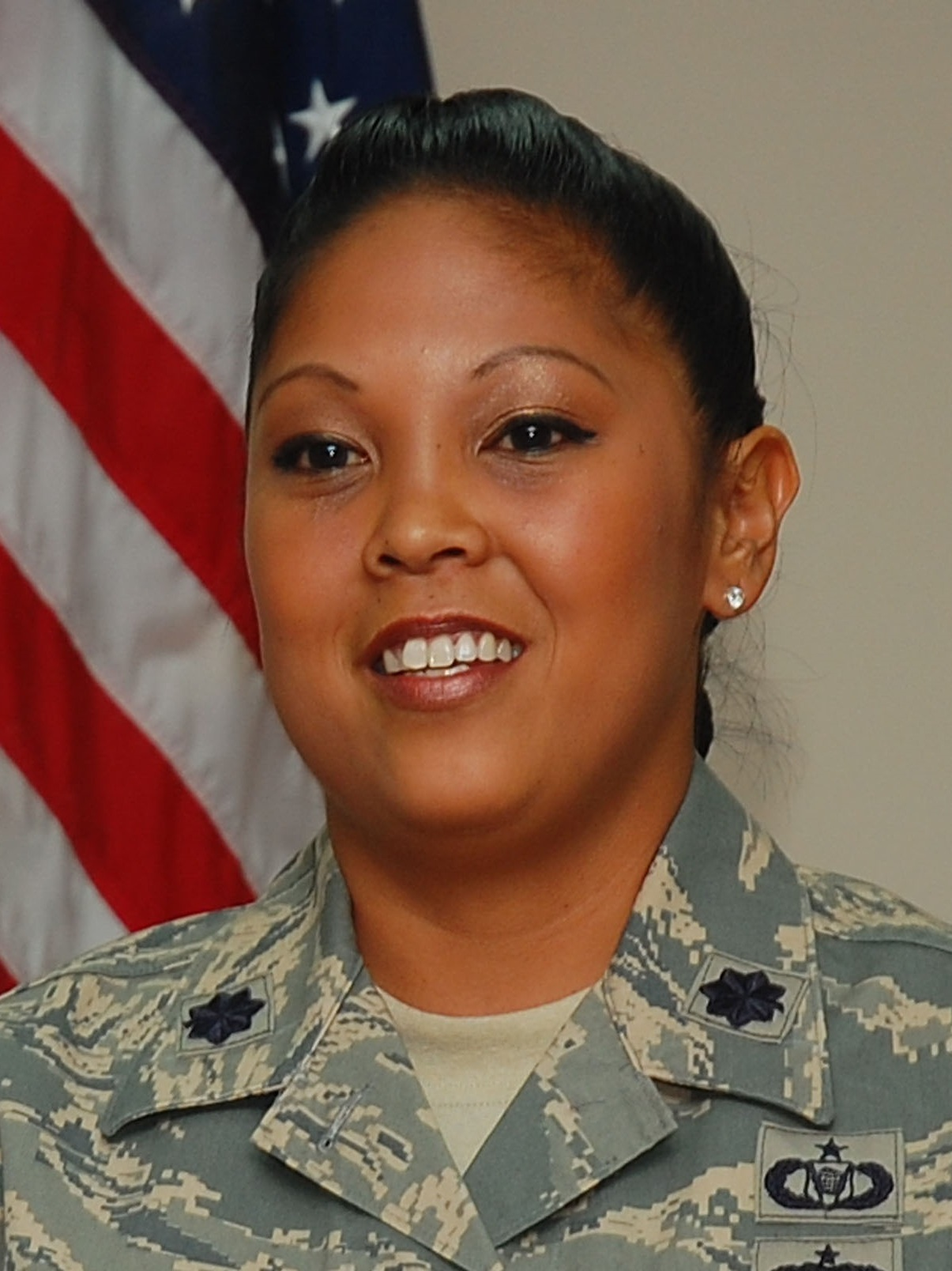
| Nominee | Colleen Hanabusa | Shirlene Ostrov |
| Party | Democratic | Republican |
| Popular vote | 145,417 | 45,958 |
| Percentage | 71.9% | 22.7% |
- Precinct results Hanabusa: 40–50% 50–60% 60–70% 70–80% 80–90% No votes
U.S. Representative before election
Vacant
Elected U.S. Representative
Colleen Hanabusa
Democratic

The 1st district is located entirely on the island of Oahu, encompassing the urban areas of the City and County of Honolulu, a consolidated city-county that includes Oahu's central plains and southern shores, including the towns of Aiea, Mililani, Pearl City, Waipahu and Waimalu. It is the only majority-Asian district in the United States. The district was vacant leading into the election. It was represented by Democrat Mark Takai from 2015 until his death in July 2016. He was elected with 51% of the vote in 2014, and the district had a PVI of D+18.

=== Democratic primary ===
Democratic primary results
| Party | Candidate | Votes | % |
|---|---|---|---|
| Democratic | Colleen Wakako Hanabusa | 74,022 | 80.4 |
| Democratic | Leina'ala Ahu Isa | 11,518 | 12.5 |
| Democratic | Howard Kim | 2,750 | 3.0 |
| Democratic | Javier Ocasio | 1,117 | 1.2 |
| Democratic | Sam Puletasi | 1,036 | 1.1 |
| Democratic | Lei Sharsh-Davis | 915 | 1.0 |
| Democratic | Steve Tataii | 737 | 0.8 |
| Total votes | | 92,095 | 100.0 |

=== Republican primary ===
Republican primary results
| Party | Candidate | Votes | % |
|---|---|---|---|
| Republican | Shirlene D. Ostrov | 13,645 | 100.0 |
| Total votes | | 13,645 | 100.0 |

=== Libertarian primary ===
Libertarian primary results
| Party | Candidate | Votes | % |
|---|---|---|---|
| Libertarian | Alan J.K. Yim | 446 | 100.0 |
| Total votes | | 446 | 100.0 |

=== Nonpartisan primary ===
Nonpartisan primary results
| Party | Candidate | Votes | % |
|---|---|---|---|
| Nonpartisan | Calvin Griffin | 552 | 100.0 |
| Total votes | | 552 | 100.0 |

=== General election ===
==== Predictions ====
| Source | Ranking | As of |
|---|---|---|
| The Cook Political Report | Safe D | November 7, 2016 |
| Daily Kos Elections | Safe D | November 7, 2016 |
| Rothenberg | Safe D | November 3, 2016 |
| Sabato's Crystal Ball | Safe D | November 7, 2016 |
| RCP | Safe D | October 31, 2016 |

==== Results ====
Hawaii's 1st congressional district, 2016
| Party | Candidate | Votes | % |
|---|---|---|---|
| Democratic | Colleen Hanabusa | 145,417 | 71.9 |
| Republican | Shirlene Ostrov | 45,958 | 22.7 |
| Libertarian | Alan Yim | 6,601 | 3.3 |
| Nonpartisan | Calvin Griffin | 4,381 | 2.1 |
| Total votes | | 202,357 | 100.0 |
| Democratic hold | | | |

== District 2 ==
United States House of Representatives District 2
- November 8, 2016
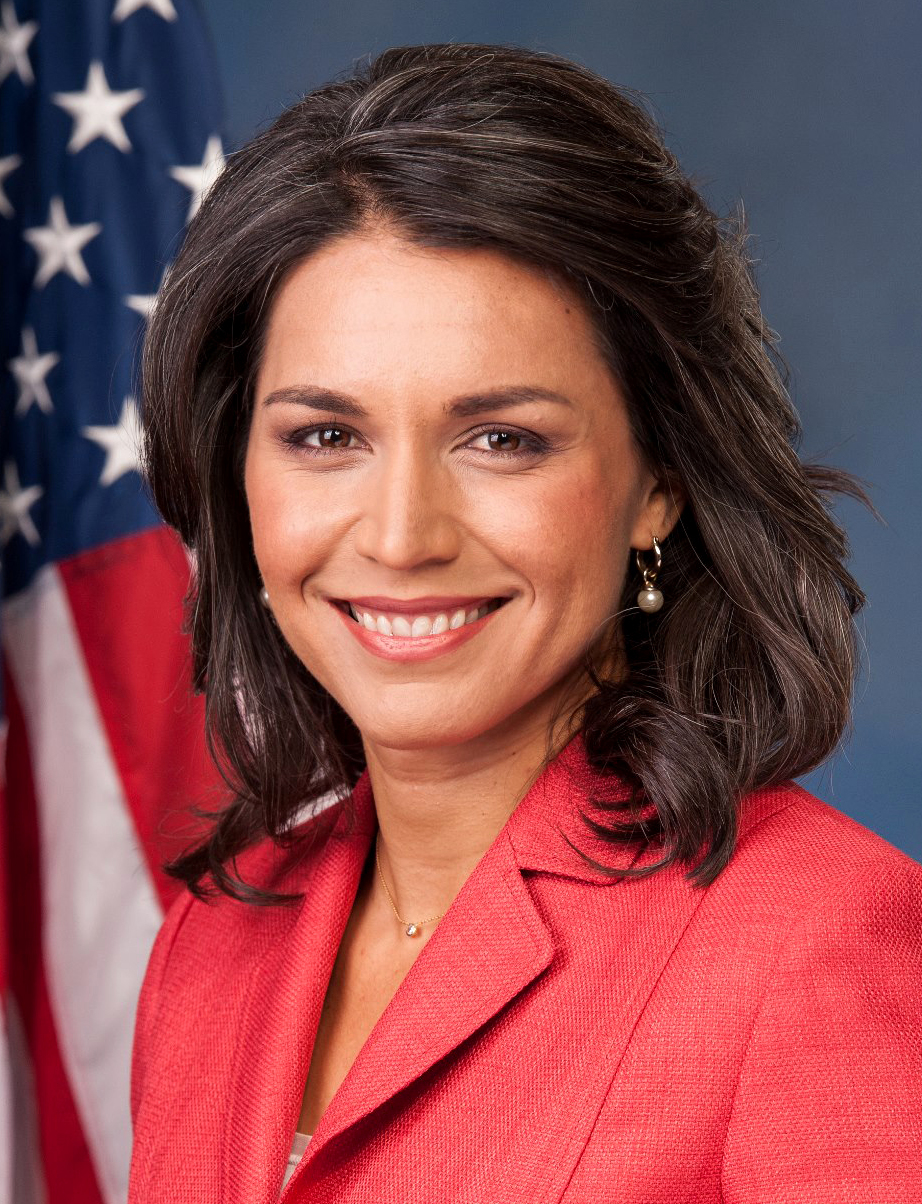

| Nominee | Tulsi Gabbard | Angela Aulani Kaaihue |
| Party | Democratic | Republican |
| Popular vote | 170,848 | 39,668 |
| Percentage | 81.2% | 18.8% |
- Precinct results Gabbard: 60–70% 70–80% 80–90% >90% Kaaihue: 50–60% No votes
U.S. Representative before election
Tulsi Gabbard
Democratic
Elected U.S. Representative
Tulsi Gabbard
Democratic

The 2nd district encompasses the rest of the island of Oahu, including the Windward, North Shore, Central and Leeward regions, as well as the entire state outside of Oahu. This includes the areas located in the counties of Kauaʻi (which includes the islands of Kauaʻi, Niʻihau, Lehua and Kaʻula), Maui (which consists of the islands of Maui, Kahoolawe, Lānai, Molokai except for a portion of Molokai that comprises Kalawao County and Molokini) and Hawaii County coextensive with the Island of Hawaii, often called "the Big Island". The incumbent is Democrat Tulsi Gabbard, who had represented the district since 2013. She was elected with 79% of the vote in 2014, and the district had a PVI of D+21.

=== Democratic primary ===
Democratic primary results
| Party | Candidate | Votes | % |
|---|---|---|---|
| Democratic | Tulsi Gabbard (incumbent) | 80,026 | 84.5 |
| Democratic | Shay Chan Hodges | 14,643 | 15.5 |
| Total votes | | 94,669 | 100.0 |

=== Republican primary ===
Republican primary results
| Party | Candidate | Votes | % |
|---|---|---|---|
| Republican | Angela Aulani Kaaihue | 7,449 | 55.9 |
| Republican | Eric Hafner | 5,876 | 44.1 |
| Total votes | | 13,325 | 100.0 |

=== Nonpartisan primary ===
Nonpartisan primary results
| Party | Candidate | Votes | % |
|---|---|---|---|
| Nonpartisan | Richard L. Turner | 697 | 100.0 |
| Total votes | | 697 | 100.0 |

=== General election ===
==== Predictions ====
| Source | Ranking | As of |
|---|---|---|
| The Cook Political Report | Safe D | November 7, 2016 |
| Daily Kos Elections | Safe D | November 7, 2016 |
| Rothenberg | Safe D | November 3, 2016 |
| Sabato's Crystal Ball | Safe D | November 7, 2016 |
| RCP | Safe D | October 31, 2016 |

==== Results ====
Hawaii's 2nd congressional district, 2016
| Party | Candidate | Votes | % |
|---|---|---|---|
| Democratic | Tulsi Gabbard (Incumbent) | 170,848 | 81.2 |
| Republican | Angela Aulani Kaaihue | 39,668 | 18.8 |
| Total votes | | 210,516 | 100.0 |
| Democratic hold | | | |

== See also ==
- 2016 United States House of Representatives elections
- 2016 United States Senate election in Hawaii
