= 2000 United States House of Representatives elections in Hawaii =

- November 7, 2000

All 2 Hawaii seats to the United States House of Representatives
	Majority party	Minority party
Party	Democratic	Republican
Last election	2	0
Seats won	2	0
Seat change	Steady	Steady
Popular vote	221,373	110,895
Percentage	65.03%	32.58%
- County results Democratic: 50–60% 60–70%

The 2000 House elections in Hawaii occurred on November 7, 2000, to elect the members of the State of Hawaii's delegation to the United States House of Representatives. Hawaii had two seats in the House, apportioned according to the 2000 United States census.

These elections were held concurrently with the United States Senate elections of 2000, the United States House elections in other states, and various state and local elections.

== Overview ==
United States House of Representatives elections in Hawaii, 2000
Party	Votes	Percentage	Seats	+/–
Democratic	221,373	65.03%	2	—
Republican	110,895	32.58%	0	—
Libertarian	8,156	2.40%	0	—
Totals	340,424	100.00%	2	—

== Results ==
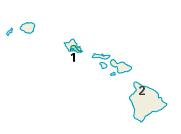
Hawaii's congressional districts for the 2000 elections

District	Incumbent	Party	First elected	Result	Candidates
Hawaii 1	Neil Abercrombie	Democratic	1986 (Special); 1988 (Lost renomination); 1990	Re-elected	Neil Abercrombie (D) 69.03% Phil Meyers (R) 28.62% Jerry Murphy (L) 2.35%
Hawaii 2	Patsy Mink	Democratic	1964; 1976 (Retired); 1990	Re-elected	Patsy Mink (D) 61.59% Russ Francis (R) 35.97% Lawrence G. K. Duquesne (L) 2.44%

== District 1 ==
2000 Hawaii's 1st congressional district election
- November 7, 2000
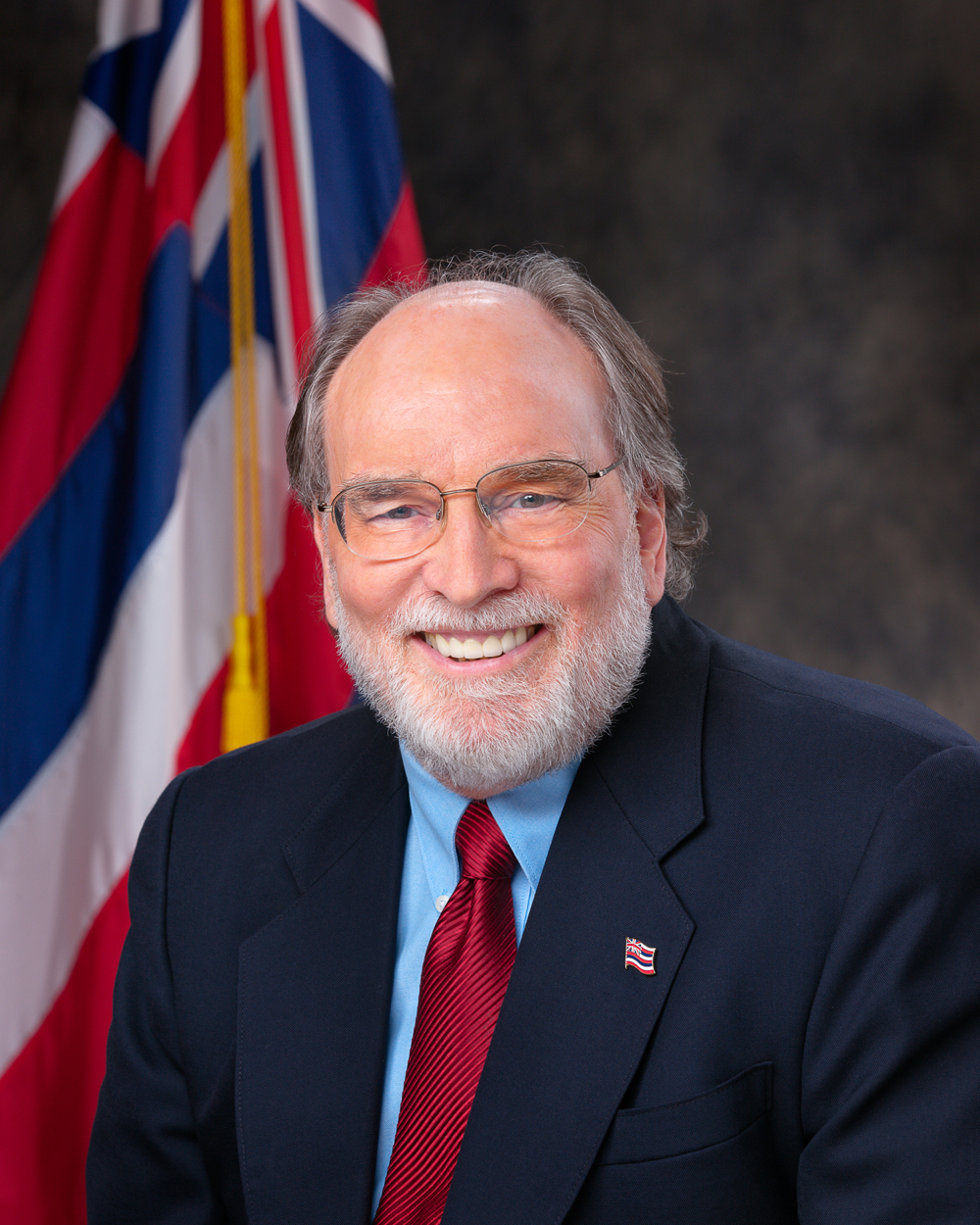

Nominee	Neil Abercrombie	Phil Meyers
Party	Democratic	Republican
Popular vote	108,517	44,989
Percentage	69.0%	28.6%
U.S. Representative before election
Neil Abercrombie
Democratic
Elected U.S. Representative
Neil Abercrombie
Democratic

Incumbent Democrat Neil Abercrombie, who was first elected in 1986, ran for re-election. Abercrombie was re-elected with 69.0% of the vote.

=== General election ===
==== Results ====
Hawaii's 1st congressional district election, 2000
Party	Candidate	Votes	%
Democratic	Neil Abercrombie (incumbent)	108,517	69.0
Republican	Phil Meyers	44,989	28.6
Libertarian	Jerry Murphy	3,688	2.3
Total votes		157,194	100.0
Democratic hold			

== District 2 ==
2000 Hawaii's 2nd congressional district election
- November 7, 2000
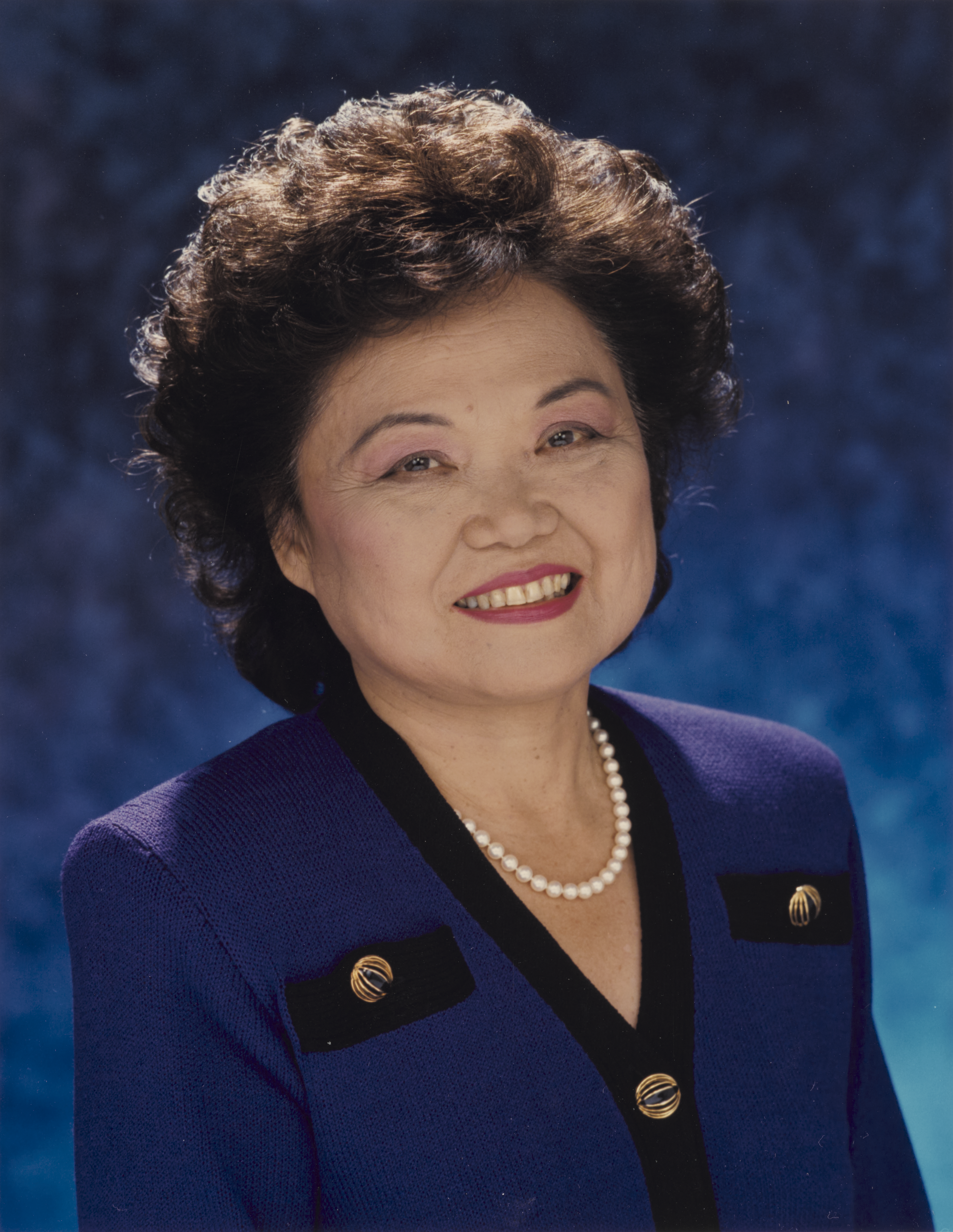

Nominee	Patsy Mink	Russ Francis
Party	Democratic	Republican
Popular vote	112,856	65,906
Percentage	61.6%	36.0%
U.S. Representative before election
Patsy Mink
Democratic
Elected U.S. Representative
Patsy Mink
Democratic

Incumbent Democrat Patsy Mink, who was first elected in 1964, ran for re-election. Mink was re-elected with 61.6% of the vote.

=== General election ===
==== Results ====
Hawaii's 2nd congressional district election, 2000
Party	Candidate	Votes	%
Democratic	Patsy Mink (incumbent)	112,856	61.6
Republican	Russ Francis	65,906	36.0
Libertarian	Lawrence G. K. Duquesne	4,468	2.4
Total votes		183,230	100.0
Democratic hold			
