= Hawaii's congressional districts =

U.S. House districts in the state of Hawaii

Map of Hawaii's congressional districts since 2023 Interactive map version

The U.S. state of Hawaii is divided into two congressional districts for representation in the United States House of Representatives. Before statehood, the Territory of Hawaii was represented by a non-voting delegate. From statehood until 1963, Hawaii had one representative. From 1963 to the creation of the two districts in 1971, Hawaii was represented in the House with two representatives elected at-large statewide.

== Current districts and representatives ==
In the 118th Congress, Hawaii is represented by two congressional districts, both of which are held by Democrats.

Current U.S. representatives from Hawaii
District	Member (Residence)	Party	Incumbent since	CPVI (2025)	District map
1st	Ed Case (Kāneʻohe)	Democratic	January 3, 2019	D+13	
2nd	Jill Tokuda (Kāneʻohe)	Democratic	January 3, 2023	D+12	

== District makeup ==
=== 1st district ===
The first congressional district is far smaller in area and has a much denser population than the second district. Covering the southeastern parts of the City & County of Honolulu, including downtown Honolulu, the district was represented by Democrat Colleen Hanabusa from 2016-2019 when she retired to unsuccessfully run for governor of Hawaii. Before her, Mark Takai held the seat from January 2015 until his death in July 2016. A special election was scheduled for November 8, 2016, the same day as the regularly-scheduled election, to fill Takai's seat for the remainder of the 114th United States Congress. That election was won by Colleen Hanabusa. Ed Case took office in 2019.

=== 2nd district ===
The second congressional district is far more spread out than the first district. Including northern and western Oahu, along with the entirety of the state's other islands, the district includes Kauaʻi, Maui, and Hawaii counties, along with part of Honolulu County. The entire district spans 331 miles (533 km) and comprises small towns with historical roots in the pineapple and sugarcane plantations. It was represented by Democrat Kai Kahele from 2021 to 2023.

Jill Tokuda took office in 2023.

== Historical and present district boundaries ==
Table of United States congressional district boundary maps in the State of Hawaii, presented chronologically. All redistricting events that took place in Hawaii between 1973 and 2013 are shown.

Year	Statewide map
1973–1982	
1983–1984	
1985–1992	
1993–2002	
2003–2013	
2013–2023	
2023–present	

== See also ==
- List of United States congressional districts
