= Bob Hogue =

American politician

Current position
- Title: Retired Commissioner
- Conference: PacWest

Biographical details
- Born: September 7, 1953 (age 72); Whittier, California, U.S.

Playing career

Baseball
- ?: USC

Coaching career (HC unless noted)

Basketball
- 2004–2006: Academy of the Pacific (HI)

Administrative career (AD unless noted)
- 2007-2023: PacWest (commissioner)

Robert Charles Hogue (born September 7, 1953) is an American athletic conference commissioner, author and columnist, sportscaster, and a former Republican member of the Hawaii State Senate representing the 24th district (Kailua-Kaneohe) for six years (2000–2006). He was the Republican nominee for U.S. Congress in Hawaii's 2nd congressional district, to replace Ed Case, but lost in the 2006 general election to former Lieutenant Governor Mazie Hirono. Hogue recently retired as the commissioner of the Pacific West Conference, a position he held from 2007 to 2023. He was the longest serving commissioner in conference history.

== Early life ==
Hogue was born on September 7, 1953, in Whittier, California. He graduated from the University of Southern California in 1975 where he played baseball and earned a degree in business with an emphasis in accounting. He earned his CPA certificate working for Price Waterhouse & Co. in southern California from 1975 to 1977.

== Broadcasting career ==
Hogue was the lead sportscaster with three #1-rated news stations: KWWL-TV in Waterloo, Iowa, and the Iowa Television Network (1979–1984), KCRA-TV in Sacramento, California (1984–1988), and KHON-TV in Honolulu, Hawaii (1988–1999). Previously, he worked at KTIV in Sioux City, Iowa, KFBB-TV in Great Falls, Montana, and radio stations in Honolulu, HI, Sacramento, CA, and Prescott, AZ. He was the play-by-play announcer for University of Iowa basketball on television in the 1980s and University of Hawaii football and basketball on radio in the 1990s, and then Hawaii Pacific University basketball on radio and television in the 2000s.

== Coaching and athletic administration career ==
Hogue was the head boys' basketball coach at Academy of the Pacific in Honolulu from 2004 to 2006 after earlier serving as head girls' basketball coach at St. Anthony's and Trinity Christian in Kailua. In 2007, he was named the commissioner of the Pacific West Conference, which is now the largest NCAA Division II conference in the west. In 2013, he was named to the DII Management Council and DII Membership Committee, serving a full four-year term on each committee until 2017. After chairing the Sports Administration committee for the DII Conference Commissioners Association, Hogue served on the DII National Committee for Men's and Women's Tennis from 2017-2019, and then the DII Nominating Committee from 2019-2023.

== Television hosting and writing ==
Hogue formerly served with Wayne Coito as host of PacWest Magazine television on OC-16 and www.thepacwest.com. From 1988-2018, Hogue wrote a weekly sports and recreation column, called "Keeping Score", for MidWeek magazine. He is a frequent contributor to other magazine publications. His first novel, Sands of Lanikai, published by Island Heritage, was released in late 2009. It is a historical fiction, mystery, and romance set in Kailua, Oahu around the time of the Attack on Pearl Harbor. Sands of Lanikai was #1 on The Honolulu Advertiser bestseller list on November 29, 2009, and remained on the Advertiser bestseller list for the next several months. The novel was later nominated for a Po'okela Award for excellence in literature. Hogue's second novel, Loves of Sedona, published by Framing Tree Publications, was released in February 2026. The historical fiction novel tells the history of beautiful Sedona, Arizona through the eyes of a family from the late 1800s to the present day.
