= 2006 United States House of Representatives elections in Hawaii =

- November 7, 2006

All 2 Hawaii seats to the United States House of Representatives
	Majority party	Minority party
Party	Democratic	Republican
Last election	2	0
Seats won	2	0
Seat change	Steady	Steady
Popular vote	219,810	118,134
Percentage	65.04%	34.95%
Swing	▲2.17%	▼0.68%
- County results Democratic: 60–70% 70–80%

The 2006 congressional elections in Hawaii were held on November 7, 2006, to determine who was to represent the state of Hawaii in the United States House of Representatives for the 111th Congress. Hawaii has two seats in the House, apportioned according to the 2000 United States census. Representatives are elected for two-year terms.

== Overview ==
United States House of Representatives elections in Hawaii, 2006
Party	Votes	Percentage	Seats	+/–
Democratic	219,810	65.04%	2	—
Republican	118,134	34.96%	0	—
Totals	337,944	100.00%	2	—

== District 1 ==
United States House of Representatives District 1
- November 7, 2006
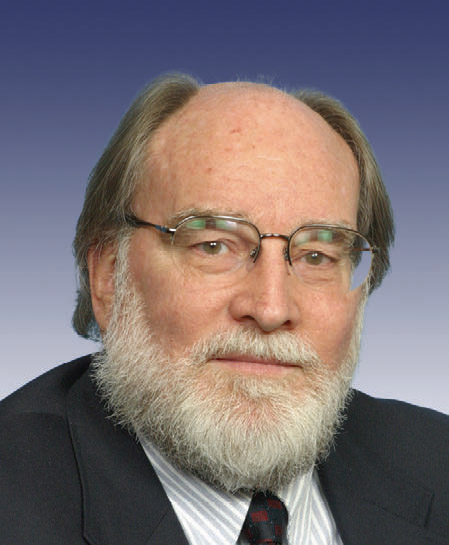

Nominee	Neil Abercrombie	Noah Hough
Party	Democratic	Republican
Popular vote	112,904	48,890
Percentage	69.78%	30.22%
U.S. Representative before election
Neil Abercrombie
Democratic
Elected U.S. Representative
Neil Abercrombie
Democratic

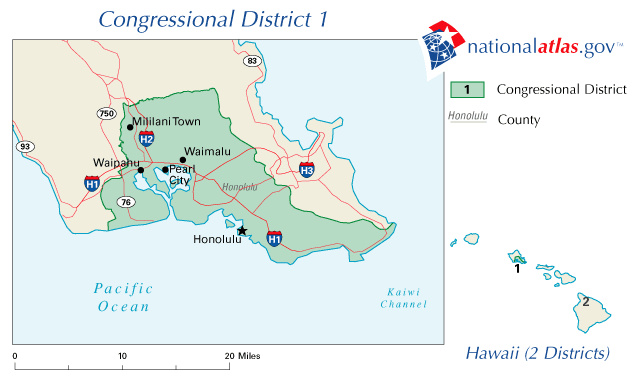

Incumbent Democrat Neil Abercrombie defeated Republican Richard Hough. This district covers the southern portion of the island, city, and county of Honolulu.

=== Predictions ===
Source	Ranking	As of
The Cook Political Report	Safe D	November 6, 2006
Rothenberg	Safe D	November 6, 2006
Sabato's Crystal Ball	Safe D	November 6, 2006
Real Clear Politics	Safe D	November 7, 2006
CQ Politics	Safe D	November 7, 2006

Hawaii's 1st congressional district election, 2006
Party	Candidate	Votes	%
Democratic	Neil Abercrombie (incumbent)	112,904	69.78
Republican	Noah Hough	48,890	30.22
Total votes		161,794	100.00
Democratic hold			

== District 2 ==
United States House of Representatives District 2
- November 7, 2006
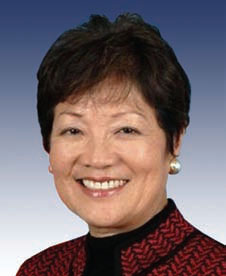

Nominee	Mazie Hirono	Bob Hogue
Party	Democratic	Republican
Popular vote	106,906	68,244
Percentage	61.04%	38.96%
U.S. Representative before election
Ed Case
Democratic
Elected U.S. Representative
Mazie Hirono
Democratic

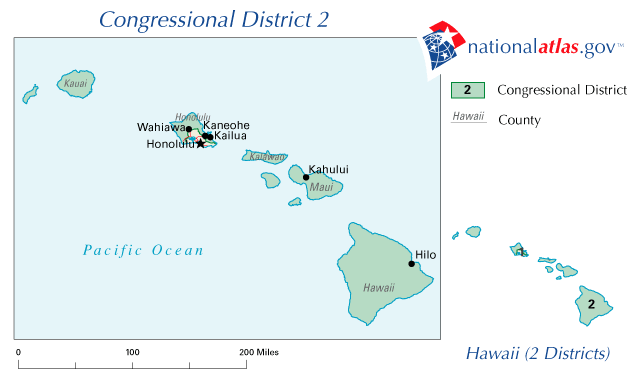

Incumbent Democrat Ed Case decided to retire in order to run for the U.S. Senate. Democrat Mazie Hirono, a former Lieutenant Governor, defeated Republican Bob Hogue, a State Senator. She became the first Buddhist to be elected to the U.S. Congress.

=== Predictions ===
Source	Ranking	As of
The Cook Political Report	Safe D	November 6, 2006
Rothenberg	Safe D	November 6, 2006
Sabato's Crystal Ball	Safe D	November 6, 2006
Real Clear Politics	Safe D	November 7, 2006
CQ Politics	Safe D	November 7, 2006

Hawaii's 2nd congressional district election, 2006
Party	Candidate	Votes	%
Democratic	Mazie Hirono	106,906	61.04
Republican	Bob Hogue	68,244	38.96
Total votes		175,150	100.00
Democratic hold			
