= Electoral history of Daniel Inouye =

Elections featuring American politician

This is a list of results for elections in which Daniel Inouye, a Democrat. He was elected Hawaii's first U.S. Representative in 1959, and was first elected to the U.S. Senate in 1962. He served until his death in 2012. Inouye is the 2nd longest-serving senator in history.

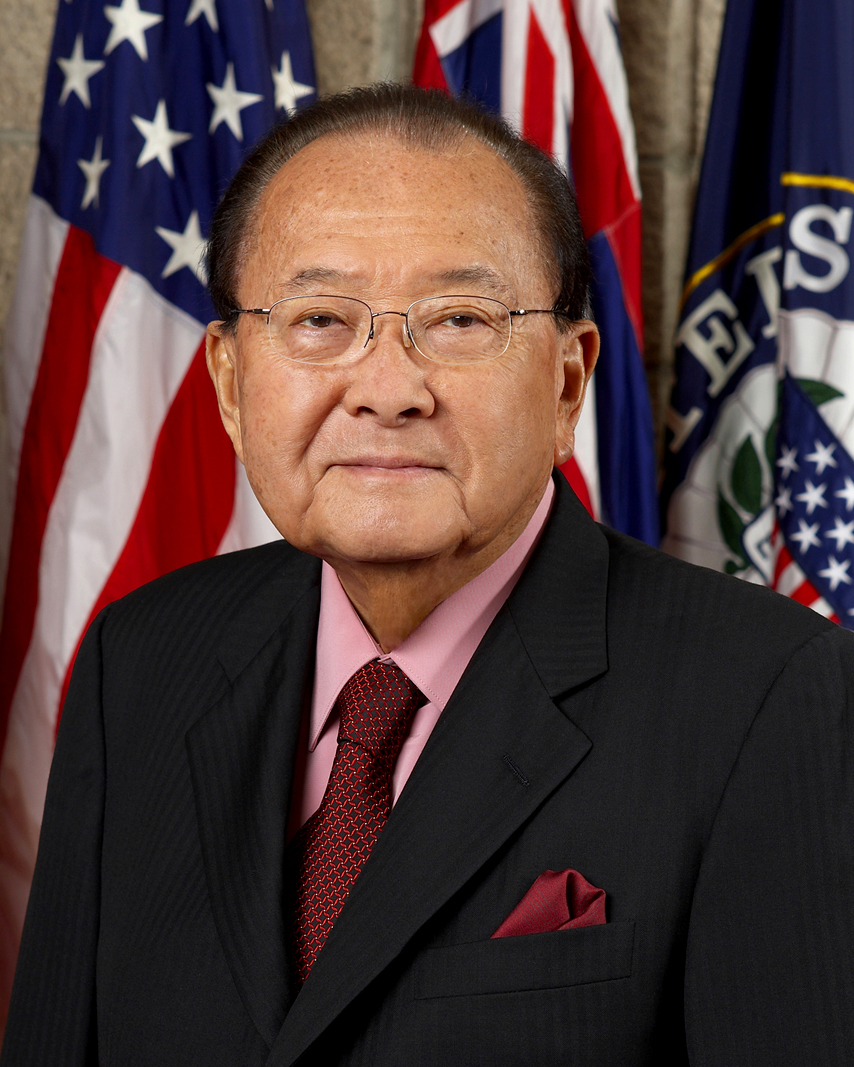
Senator Daniel Inouye (D-HI)

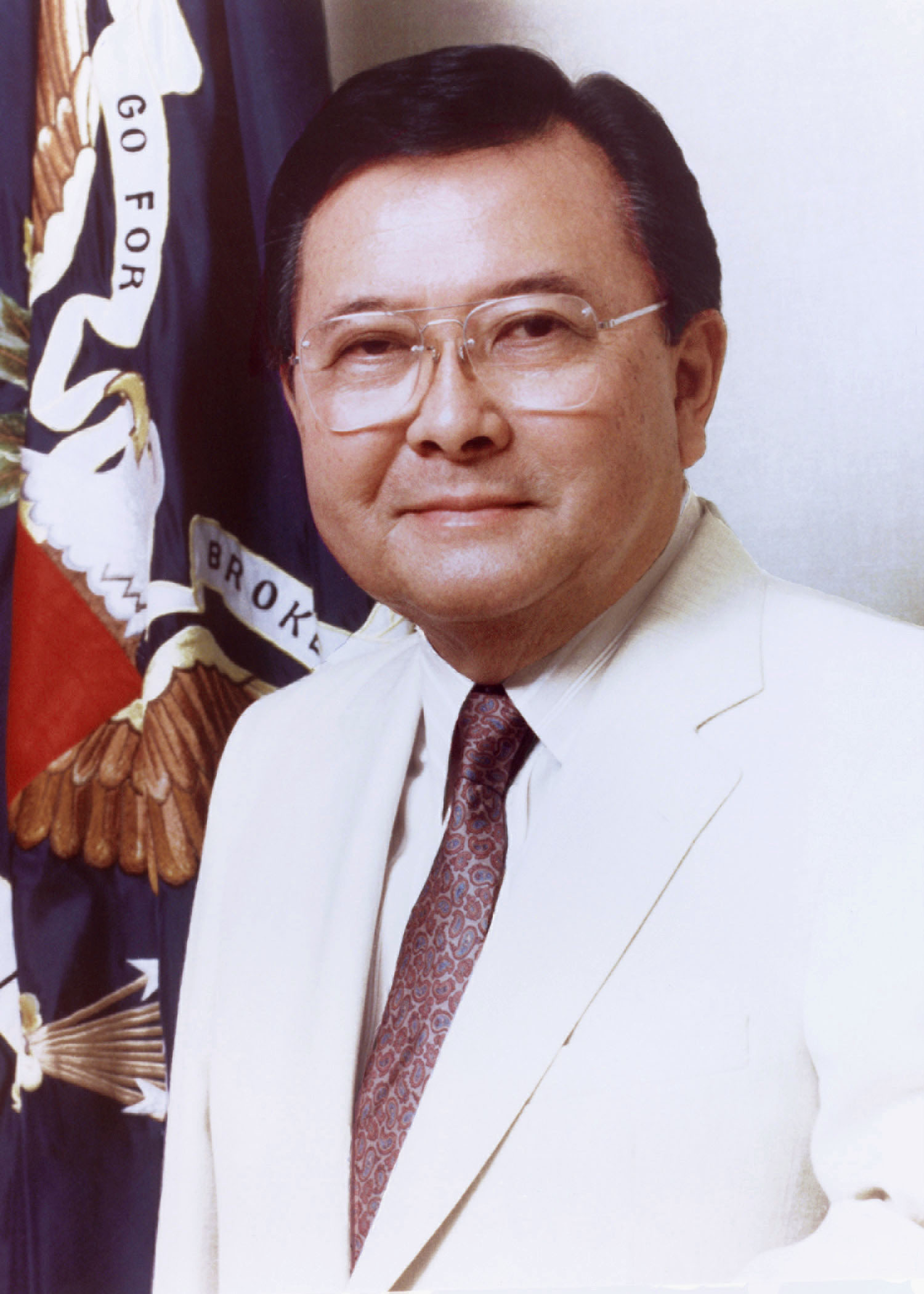
Inouye earlier in his career in the Senate

== Almanac ==
United States Congressional Service
| Years | Congress | Chamber | House Majority | President | Congressional District |
|---|---|---|---|---|---|
| 1957-59 | 85th | U.S. House | Democratic | Dwight D. Eisenhower | Hawaii’s At-Large |
| 1959-61 | 86th | U.S. House | Democratic | Dwight D. Eisenhower | Hawaii’s At-Large |
| 1961-63 | 87th | U.S. House | Democratic | John F. Kennedy | Hawaii’s At-Large |
| Years | Congress | Chamber | Senate Majority | Senate Vice President | Constituency |
| 1963-65 | 88th | U.S. Senate | Democratic | Lyndon B. Johnson Vacant | Hawaii |
| 1965-67 | 89th | U.S. Senate | Democratic | Vacant Hubert Humphrey | Hawaii |
| 1967-69 | 90th | U.S. Senate | Democratic | Hubert Humphrey | Hawaii |
| 1969-71 | 91st | U.S. Senate | Democratic | Sipro Agnew | Hawaii |
| 1971-73 | 92nd | U.S. Senate | Democratic | Sipro Agnew | Hawaii |
| 1973-75 | 93rd | U.S. Senate | Democratic | Spiro Agnew Vacant Gerald Ford Vacant Nelson Rockefeller | Hawaii |
| 1975-77 | 94th | U.S. Senate | Democratic | Nelson Rockefeller | Hawaii |
| 1977-79 | 95th | U.S. Senate | Democratic | Walter Mondale | Hawaii |
| 1979-81 | 96th | U.S. Senate | Democratic | Walter Mondale | Hawaii |
| 1981-83 | 97th | U.S. Senate | Republican | George H.W. Bush | Hawaii |
| 1983-85 | 98th | U.S. Senate | Republican | George H.W. Bush | Hawaii |
| 1985-87 | 99th | U.S. Senate | Republican | George H.W. Bush | Hawaii |
| 1987-89 | 100th | U.S. Senate | Democratic | George H.W. Bush | Hawaii |
| 1989-91 | 101st | U.S. Senate | Democratic | Dan Quayle | Hawaii |
| 1991-93 | 102nd | U.S. Senate | Democratic | Dan Quayle | Hawaii |
| 1993-95 | 103rd | U.S. Senate | Democratic | Al Gore | Hawaii |
| 1995-97 | 104th | U.S. Senate | Republican | Al Gore | Hawaii |
| 1997-99 | 105th | U.S. Senate | Republican | Al Gore | Hawaii |
| 1999-2001 | 106th | U.S. Senate | Republican | Al Gore | Hawaii |
| 2001-03 | 107th | U.S. Senate | Democratic(with tie breaking VP) Republican Democratic (through caucus) | Dick Cheney | Hawaii |
| 2003-05 | 108th | U.S. Senate | Republican | Dick Cheney | Hawaii |
| 2005-07 | 109th | U.S. Senate | Republican | Dick Cheney | Hawaii |
| 2007-09 | 110th | U.S. Senate | Democratic | Dick Cheney | Hawaii |
| 2009-11 | 111th | U.S. Senate | Democratic | Joe Biden | Hawaii |
| 2011-12 | 112th | U.S. Senate | Democratic | Joe Biden | Hawaii |

== Electoral results ==
1959 Election for U.S. Representative of Hawaii's at-large district
Primary election
| Party | Candidate | Votes | % |
|---|---|---|---|
| Democratic | Daniel Inouye | 51,787 | 65.33 |
| Democratic | Patsy Mink | 21,702 | 27.38 |
| Democratic | Elizabeth K. Young | 5,783 | 7.30 |
| Total votes | | 79,272 | 100.00 |
General election
| Democratic | Daniel Inouye | 111,727 | 68.64 |
| Republican | Charles H. Silva | 51,058 | 31.37 |
| Total votes | | 162,785 | 100.00 |

1960 Election for U.S. Representative of Hawaii's at-large district
| Party | Candidate | Votes | % |
|---|---|---|---|
| Democratic | Daniel Inouye (incumbent) | 135,827 | 74.37 |
| Republican | Frederick Titcomb | 46,812 | 25.63 |
| Total votes | | 182,639 | 100.00 |

1962 U.S. Senate election in Hawaii
Primary election
| Party | Candidate | Votes | % |
|---|---|---|---|
| Democratic | Daniel Inouye | 80,707 | 93.65 |
| Democratic | Frank Troy | 5,476 | 6.35 |
| Total votes | | 86,183 | 100.00 |
General election
| Democratic | Daniel Inouye | 136,294 | 69.41 |
| Republican | Ben Dillingham III | 60,067 | 30.59 |
| Democratic hold | | | |
| Total votes | | 196,361 | 100.00 |

1968 U.S. Senate election in Hawaii
Primary election
| Party | Candidate | Votes | % |
|---|---|---|---|
| Democratic | Daniel Inouye (incumbent) | 111,135 | 87.54 |
| Democratic | William Lampard | 14,357 | 11.31 |
| Democratic | Joseph Petrowski | 1,469 | 1.16 |
| Total votes | | 126,961 | 100.00 |
General election
| Democratic | Daniel Inouye (incumbent) | 189,248 | 83.40 |
| Republican | Wayne C. Thiessen | 34,008 | 14.99 |
| Peace and Freedom | Oliver M. Lee | 3,671 | 1.62 |
| Total votes | | 235,686 | 100.00 |
| Democratic hold | | | |

1974 U.S. Senate election in Hawaii
| Party | Candidate | Votes | % |
|---|---|---|---|
| Democratic | Daniel Inouye (incumbent) | 207,454 | 82.91 |
| People's | James D. Kimmel | 42,767 | 17.09 |
| Total votes | | 250,221 | 100.00 |
| Democratic hold | | | |

1980 U.S. Senate election in Hawaii
Primary election
| Party | Candidate | Votes | % |
|---|---|---|---|
| Democratic | Daniel Inouye (incumbent) | 198,468 | 87.52 |
| Democratic | Kamuela Price | 15,361 | 6.77 |
| Democratic | John P. Fritz | 12,929 | 5.70 |
| Total votes | | 226,758 | 100.00 |
General election
| Democratic | Daniel Inouye (incumbent) | 224,485 | 77.95 |
| Republican | Cooper Brown | 53,068 | 18.43 |
| Libertarian | H.E. Shasteen | 10,453 | 3.63 |
| Total votes | | 288,006 | 100.00 |
| Democratic hold | | | |

1986 U.S. Senate election in Hawaii
| Party | Candidate | Votes | % |
|---|---|---|---|
| Democratic | Daniel Inouye (incumbent) | 241,887 | 73.57 |
| Republican | Frank Hutchinson | 86,910 | 26.43 |
| Total votes | | 328,797 | 100.00 |
| Democratic hold | | | |

1992 U.S. Senate election in Hawaii
| Party | Candidate | Votes | % |
|---|---|---|---|
| Democratic | Daniel Inouye (incumbent) | 208,266 | 57.27 |
| Republican | Rick Reed | 97,928 | 26.93 |
| Green | Linda Martin | 49,921 | 13.73 |
| Libertarian | Richard Rowland | 7,547 | 2.08 |
| Total votes | | 363,662 | 100.00 |
| Democratic hold | | | |

1998 U.S. Senate election in Hawaii
Primary election
| Party | Candidate | Votes | % |
|---|---|---|---|
| Democratic | Daniel Inouye (incumbent) | 108,891 | 92.79 |
| Democratic | Richard Thompson | 8,468 | 7.22 |
| Total votes | | 117,359 | 100.00 |
General election
| Democratic | Daniel Inouye (incumbent) | 315,252 | 79.18 |
| Republican | Crystal Young | 70,964 | 17.82 |
| Libertarian | Lloyd Mallan | 11,908 | 2.99 |
| Total votes | | 244,288 | 100.00 |
| Democratic hold | | | |

2004 U.S. Senate election in Hawaii
Primary election
| Party | Candidate | Votes | % |
|---|---|---|---|
| Democratic | Daniel Inouye (incumbent) | 153,748 | 95.18 |
| Democratic | Brian Evans | 7,790 | 4.82 |
| Total votes | | 161,538 | 100.00 |
General election
| Democratic | Daniel Inouye (incumbent) | 313,629 | 75.51 |
| Republican | Cam Cavasso | 87,172 | 20.99 |
| Independent | Jim Brewer | 9,269 | 2.23 |
| Libertarian | Lloyd Mallan | 5,277 | 1.27 |
| Total votes | | 415,347 | 100.00 |
| Democratic hold | | | |

United States Senate election in Hawaii, 2010
| Party | Candidate | Votes | % | ±% |
|---|---|---|---|---|
| Democratic | Daniel Inouye (incumbent) | 276,928 | 74.81% | −0.70% |
| Republican | Cam Cavasso | 79,830 | 21.57% | +0.58% |
| Green | Jim Brewer | 7,756 | 2.10% | N/A |
| Libertarian | Lloyd Jeffrey Mallen | 2,953 | 0.80% | −0.47% |
| Independent | Jeff Jarrett | 2,695 | 0.73% | N/A |
| Majority | | 197,098 | 53.25% | |
| Total votes | | 370,162 | 100 | |
| Democratic hold | | Swing | | |

== Presidential elections ==
1972 Democratic National Convention (vice presidential tally):

- Thomas Eagleton – 1,742 (59.07%)
- Frances Farenthold – 405 (13.73%)
- Mike Gravel – 226 (7.66%)
- Endicott Peabody – 108 (3.66%)
- Clay Smothers – 74 (2.51%)
- Birch Bayh – 62 (2.10%)
- Peter Rodino – 57 (1.93%)
- Jimmy Carter – 30 (1.02%)
- Shirley Chisholm – 20 (0.68%)
- Moon Landrieu – 19 (0.64%)
- Edward T. Breathitt – 18 (0.61%)
- Ted Kennedy – 15 (0.51%)
- Fred R. Harris – 14 (0.48%)
- Richard G. Hatcher – 11 (0.37%)
- Harold E. Hughes – 10 (0.34%)
- Joseph M. Montoya – 9 (0.31%)
- William L. Guy – 8 (0.27%)
- Adlai Stevenson III – 8 (0.27%)
- Robert Bergland – 5 (0.17%)
- Hodding Carter – 5 (0.17%)
- Cesar Chavez – 5 (0.17%)
- Wilbur Mills – 5 (0.17%)
- Wendell Anderson – 4 (0.14%)
- Stanley Arnold – 4 (0.14%)
- Ron Dellums – 4 (0.14%)
- John J. Houlihan – 4 (0.14%)
- Roberto A. Mondragon – 4 (0.14%)
- Reubin O'Donovan Askew – 3 (0.10%)
- Herman Badillo – 3 (0.10%)
- Eugene McCarthy – 3 (0.10%)
- Claiborne Pell – 3 (0.10%)
- Terry Sanford – 3 (0.10%)
- Ramsey Clark – 2 (0.07%)
- Richard J. Daley – 2 (0.07%)
- John DeCarlo – 2 (0.07%)
- Ernest Gruening – 2 (0.07%)
- Roger Mudd – 2 (0.07%)
- Edmund Muskie – 2 (0.07%)
- Claude Pepper – 2 (0.07%)
- Abraham Ribicoff – 2 (0.07%)
- Pat Taylor – 2 (0.07%)
- Leonard F. Woodcock – 2 (0.07%)
- Bruno Agnoli – 2 (0.07%)
- Ernest Albright – 1 (0.03%)
- William A. Barrett – 1 (0.03%)
- Daniel Berrigan – 1 (0.03%)
- Phillip Berrigan – 1 (0.03%)
- Julian Bond – 1 (0.03%)
- Hargrove Bowles – 1 (0.03%)
- Archibald "Archie" Bunker – 1 (0.03%)
- Phillip Burton – 1 (0.03%)
- William Chappell – 1 (0.03%)
- Lawton Chiles – 1 (0.03%)
- Frank Church – 1 (0.03%)
- Robert Drinan – 1 (0.03%)
- Nick Galifianakis – 1 (0.03%)
- John Goodrich – 1 (0.03%)
- Michael Griffin – 1 (0.03%)
- Martha Griffiths – 1 (0.03%)
- Charles Hamilton – 1 (0.03%)
- Patricia Harris – 1 (0.03%)
- Jim Hunt – 1 (0.03%)
- Daniel Inouye – 1 (0.03%)
- Henry M. Jackson – 1 (0.03%)
- Robery Kariss – 1 (0.03%)
- Allard K. Lowenstein – 1 (0.03%)
- Mao Zedong – 1 (0.03%)
- Eleanor McGovern – 1 (0.03%)
- Martha Mitchell – 1 (0.03%)
- Ralph Nader – 1 (0.03%)
- George Norcross – 1 (0.03%)
- Jerry Rubin – 1 (0.03%)
- Fred Seaman – 1 (0.03%)
- Joe Smith – 1 (0.03%)
- Benjamin Spock – 1 (0.03%)
- Patrick Tavolacci – 1 (0.03%)
- George Wallace – 1 (0.03%)
