= Oliver Lee =

Oliver Lee may refer to:

- Oliver Lee (New Mexico gunfighter) (1865–1941), American political figure
- Oliver M. Lee (born 1929), Chinese-American academic; campaigned for U.S. Senate (See Electoral history of Daniel Inouye)
- Oliver Lee (actor) (born 1986), English performer
- Olly Lee (born 1991), English midfielder for Gillingham
- Oliver Lee, one half of British electronic music duo Snakehips
- Oliver Lee (naval architect), boat designer and builder, whose designs include the Ajax 23 and Squib sailboat
- Oliver A. Lee, former senior officer in the UK Royal Marines
- Oliver J. Lee (1876-1947), American farmer, businessman, and politician

== See also ==
- USS Oliver H. Lee (1861), American schooner used by Union Navy during Civil War
- Oliver Lee Memorial State Park, American state park, located in Southern New Mexico's Otero County, United States
- Lee (English surname)
