= Elections in Hawaii =

Elections in Hawaii are held for various local, state, and federal seats in the state of Hawaii. Regular elections are held every even year, although special elections may be held to fill vacancies at other points in time. The primary election is held on the second Saturday in August, while the general election is held on Election Day, which is the first Tuesday after the first Monday in November.

In a 2020 study, Hawaii was ranked as the 6th-easiest state for citizens to vote in, based on registration and identification requirements, and convenience provisions.

The next scheduled statewide general election in Hawaii will take place on November 7, 2028. The most recent statewide election was held on November 3, 2026.

== Elected offices ==
=== Federal ===
Hawaii participates in federal elections along with every other state in the United States. The state votes on electors for president and vice president, as well as legislators to represent it in Congress.

==== President and Vice President ====
Since its admission in 1959, Hawaii has participated in 17 indirect presidential elections which have been held every four years since 1960. The state is currently delegated four electors to the Electoral College which has remained unchanged since 1964. Candidates for president and vice president are listed on the ballot either as nominees of a qualified political party, or as a petitioned candidate who represents an unqualified party or group.

==== Senate ====
Hawaii is represented in the United States Senate by two senators. They are elected to six-year terms through statewide elections with candidates nominated by political parties through partisan primary elections. Mazie Hirono and Brian Schatz serve as the state's current senators. Hirono was last elected in 2024 and is up for re-election in 2030, while Schatz was last elected in 2022 and is up for re-election in 2028.

==== House of Representatives ====
Additionally, Hawaii is represented in the United States House of Representatives by two members of Congress, whom are elected in the two congressional districts to two-year terms. The districts are reapportioned every ten years following the release of a new census. The state's current representatives are Ed Case, who represents the 1st district, and Jill Tokuda, who represents the 2nd district. They were last elected in 2024 and are both up for re-election in 2026.

=== State ===
Hawaii also holds elections for its own state government.

==== Governor and lieutenant governor ====
The governor and lieutenant governor are the only statewide elected executive offices. Candidates for both offices are nominated in separate primary elections and run as a party-nominated ticket in the general election. They are elected to four-year terms and are limited from serving more than two consecutive terms, although a governor is eligible for re-election if they were out of office for at least one election cycle. The current governor is Josh Green, serving with lieutenant governor Sylvia Luke. They were elected in 2022. Green is eligible for re-election in 2026.

===== Gubernatorial election results =====
Year	Democratic nominee			Republican nominee			Independent candidate			Libertarian nominee			Green nominee			Other candidate			Other candidate		
Year	Candidate	#	%	Candidate	#	%	Candidate	#	%	Candidate	#	%	Candidate	#	%	Candidate	#	%	Candidate	#	%
1959	John A. Burns	82,074	48.66%	William F. Quinn	86,213	51.12%	–			–			–			David Kihei (Commonwealth)	480	0.98%	–		
1962	John A. Burns	114,308	58.32%	William F. Quinn	81,707	41.68%	–			–			–			–			–		
1966	John A. Burns	108,840	51.06%	Randolph Crossley	104,324	48.94%	–			–			–			–			–		
1970	John A. Burns	137,812	57.65%	Samuel P. King	101,249	42.35%	–			–			–			–			–		
1974	George Ariyoshi	136,262	54.58%	Randolph Crossley	113,388	45.42%	–			–			–			–			–		
1978	George Ariyoshi	153,394	54.48%	John R. Leopold	124,610	44.25%	Alema Leota	1,982	0.70%	Gregory Reeser	1,059	0.38%	–			John Moore (Aloha Democratic)	542	0.19%	–		
1982	George Ariyoshi	141,043	45.23%	D. G. Anderson	81,507	26.14%	Frank Fasi	89,303	28.64%	–			–			–			–		
1986	John D. Waiheʻe	173,655	51.98%	D. G. Anderson	160,460	48.02%	–			–			–			–			–		
1990	John D. Waiheʻe	203,491	59.83%	Fred Hemmings	131,310	38.61%	Peggy Ha'o Ross	2,446	0.72%	Don Smith	2,885	0.85%	–			–			–		
1994	Ben Cayetano	134,978	36.58%	Pat Saiki	107,908	29.24%	–			–			Kioni Dudley	12,969	3.51%	Frank Fasi (Best)	113,158	30.67%	–		
1998	Ben Cayetano	204,206	50.11%	Linda Lingle	198,952	48.82%	–			George Peabody	4,398	1.08%	–			–			–		
2002	Mazie Hirono	179,647	47.01%	Linda Lingle	197,009	51.56%	Jim Brewer	1,147	0.30%	Tracy Ryan	1,364	0.36%	–			Bu La'ia Hill (Natural Law)	2,561	0.67%	Daniel Cunningham (Independent)	382	0.10%
2006	Randy Iwase	121,717	35.35%	Linda Lingle	215,313	62.53%	–			Ozell Daniel	1,850	0.54%	Jim Brewer	5,435	1.58%	–			–		
2010	Neil; Abercrombie	222,724	58.22%	Duke Aiona	157,311	41.12%	Tom Pollard	1,263	0.33%	–			–			Daniel Cunningham (Free Energy)	1,265	0.33%	–		
2014	David Ige	181,106	49.45%	Duke Aiona	135,775	37.08%	Mufi Hannemann	42,934	11.72%	Jeff Davis	6,395	1.75%	–			–			–		
2018	David Ige	244,934	62.67%	Andria Tupola	131,719	33.70%	Terrence Teruya	4,067	1.04%	–			Jim Brewer	10,123	2.59%	–			–		
2022	Josh Green	261,025	63.16%	Duke Aiona	152,237	36.84%	–			–			–			–			–		
2026	Josh Green	278,652	72.65%	Gary Cordery	104,926	27.35%	–			–			–			–			–		

==== Senate ====
All twenty-five members of the Hawaii Senate are elected in single-member constituent districts. The senate follows a 2-4-4 term system; every ten years, senators are elected to two-year terms, while the next four elections are held for four-year terms in half of the senate's seats. The current composition of the senate was elected in 2022 and 2024; half of the seats will be up for election in 2026.

==== House of Representatives ====
All fifty-one members of the Hawaii House of Representatives are elected to two-year terms in single-member constituent districts. The current composition of the house was elected in 2024; all seats will be up for election in 2026.

=== Office of Hawaiian Affairs ===
All nine members of the Office of Hawaiian Affairs Board of Trustees are elected in nonpartisan statewide contests. Trustees are elected to a four-year term by general election of Hawaii registered voters. The islands of Oahu, Kauai, Maui, Molokai, and Hawai‘i each have one representative trustee; the rest serve in an at-large capacity. The current composition of the board was elected in 2024; the trustees for Maui, Oahu, and three at-large seats will be up for election in 2026.

== Political parties ==
As of March 2026, there are four registered political parties in Hawaii:

- Democratic Party of Hawaii (D)
- Green Party of Hawaii (G)
- Libertarian Party of Hawaii (L)
- Hawaii Republican Party (R)

For a political party to qualify, it must petition for signatures of at least 0.1% of total registered voters as of the previous general election. The petition is due 170 days before the primary election. For a registered party to remain qualified, it must have run a candidate in the previous general election for any statewide office or U.S. Representative seat whose incumbent was either barred from or chose not to run for re-election. Additionally, the party must have satisfied at least one of the following requirements in the previous election:

- Received at least 10% of the vote in any statewide or U.S. Representative election.
- Received at least 4% of the total vote of all state senate elections.
- Received at least 4% of the total vote of all state representative elections.
- Received at least 2% of the total vote of all state senate and state representative elections.

Formerly qualified parties include:

- No Labels Hawaii (NL)
- Party for Socialism and Liberation (SL)
- Solidarity Party of Hawaii (S)
- We The People (W)

=== Nonpartisan candidates ===
Hawaii is unique in that it is the only state in the country in which independent or candidates run in a primary election to qualify as the sole Nonpartisan candidate in the general election. To appear on the ballot, these candidates must either receive 10% of the total primary votes for the office, or receive more votes than the lowest vote received by a partisan candidate.

== Upcoming elections ==
=== 2028 ===
- 2028 United States Senate election in Hawaii

== List of recent elections ==
=== 2026 ===
- 2026 United States House of Representatives elections in Hawaii
- 2026 Hawaii gubernatorial election
- 2026 Hawaii Senate election
- 2026 Hawaii House of Representatives election
- 2026 Office of Hawaiian Affairs election
- 2026 Hawaii ballot measures
- 2026 Hawaii local elections
  - 2026 Hawaii County elections
  - 2026 Honolulu County elections
  - 2026 Kauaʻi County elections
    - 2026 Kauaʻi County mayoral election
  - 2026 Maui County elections
    - 2026 Maui County mayoral election

=== 2024 ===
- 2024 United States presidential election in Hawaii
- 2024 United States Senate election in Hawaii
- 2024 United States House of Representatives elections in Hawaii
- 2024 Hawaii Senate election
- 2024 Hawaii House of Representatives election
- 2024 Honolulu mayoral election
- 2024 Hawaii Democratic presidential caucuses
- 2024 Hawaii Republican presidential caucuses

=== 2022 ===
- 2022 United States Senate election in Hawaii
- 2022 United States House of Representatives elections in Hawaii
- 2022 Hawaii gubernatorial election
- 2022 Hawaii Senate election
- 2022 Hawaii House of Representatives election

=== 2020 ===
- 2020 United States presidential election in Hawaii
  - 2020 Hawaii Democratic presidential primary
- 2020 United States House of Representatives elections in Hawaii
- 2020 Hawaii Senate election
- 2020 Hawaii House of Representatives election
- 2020 Honolulu mayoral election

=== 2018 ===
- 2018 United States Senate election in Hawaii
- 2018 United States House of Representatives elections in Hawaii
- 2018 Hawaii gubernatorial election
- 2018 Hawaii Senate election
- 2018 Hawaii House of Representatives election

== See also ==
- Women's suffrage in Hawaii
- Political party strength in Hawaii
