= Bob McDermott =

American politician (born 1963)

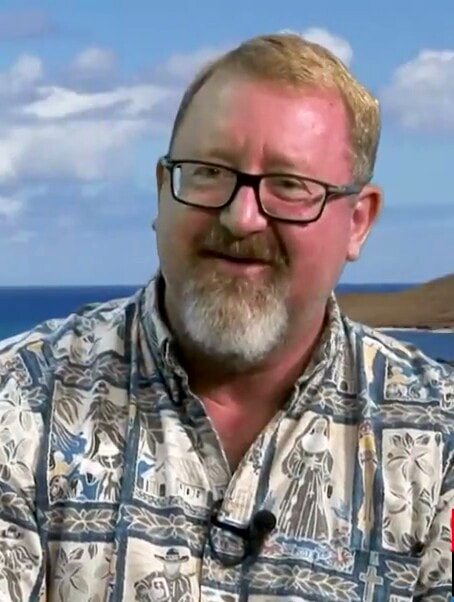
- McDermott in 2018

Member of the Hawaii Senate
- Incumbent
- Assumed office November 3, 2026
- Preceded by: Kurt Fevella
- Constituency: 20th district

Member of the Hawaii House of Representatives
- In office November 6, 2012 – November 8, 2022
- Preceded by: Redistricted
- Succeeded by: Rose Martinez
- Constituency: 40th district
- In office November 5, 1996 – November 5, 2002
- Preceded by: Robert Bunda
- Succeeded by: Lynn Finnegan
- Constituency: 32nd district

Personal details
- Born: Robert Charles McDermott; August 5, 1963 (age 63) Lansdale, Pennsylvania, U.S.
- Party: Republican
- Education: Chaminade University (BA, MBA)

Robert Charles (Bob) McDermott (born August 5, 1963) is an American politician serving as a Republican member of the Hawaii Senate since 2026. He represents the 20th district, which includes ‘Ewa Beach, Ocean Pointe, ‘Ewa by Gentry, and Iroquois Point. McDermott previously served as a member of the Hawaii House of Representatives for 16 years, from 1996 to 2002 and 2012 to 2022.

McDermott initially served three terms in the Hawaii House of Representatives from 1996 until 2002 but left to run unsuccessfully for Hawaii's 2nd congressional district in the United States House of Representatives. He returned to the Hawaii House of Representatives in 2012 before leaving state office in 2022 to run as the Republican nominee for U.S. Senator from Hawaii, losing to incumbent Democratic Senator Brian Schatz in the 2022 election. McDermott was again the Republican nominee for the 2024 Senate election, losing to incumbent Democratic Senator Mazie Hirono.

In the Republican primary for the 2026 Hawaii Senate election, McDermott ran for Senate District 20 and won the party nomination against the incumbent Kurt Fevella following a random draw to break an unprecedented tie of 1,212 votes each. McDermott went on to defeat the Democratic candidate Markus Owens in the general election.

== Education ==
McDermott is a 1981 graduate of Upper Perkiomen High School in Pennsburg, Pennsylvania. He earned his BA in economics and his MBA from Chaminade University of Honolulu.

== Career ==
=== Political views ===
McDermott made headlines in 2013 for his vocal opposition to same-sex marriage. It ultimately became law in Hawaii, and Bob McDermott turned his focus on Pono Choices, a sex education program in Hawaii. On January 8, 2014, McDermott held a press conference in opposition to Pono Choices in which he gave a presentation on oral sex, vaginal sex, and anal sex, in contrast with what he said the program teaches.

In July 2022, McDermott said he was the first elected official to call for closure of the U.S. military's Red Hill Underground Fuel Storage Facility, which he identified as the biggest issue facing Hawaii. He has criticized Hawaii's congressional delegation for slowness to take action, saying he would have done so safely within a year and a half.

=== 2018 gubernatorial run ===
McDermott announced his intent to run for Governor of Hawaii in the 2018 election on May 12, 2017. He withdrew his candidacy in August 2017.

=== Controversies ===
On March 14, 2016, during a debate over the state budget, McDermott yelled profanities at fellow Republicans for not volunteering time to him as he was at the limit of his allotted time. McDermott told his colleagues to "start acting like (expletive) Republicans" and "do your (expletive) job."

McDermott made headlines again in March 2017 after voting Beth Fukumoto out of her position as House Minority Leader, saying that her criticisms of Donald Trump and attendance at the Women's March were only to gain publicity for herself.

== Elections ==
- 1996 – When Democratic Representative Robert Bunda ran for Hawaii Senate and left the House District 32 seat open, McDermott was unopposed for the September 21, 1996, Republican Primary, winning with 304 votes, and won the November 5, 1996, general election with 2,483 votes (53.5%) against Democratic nominee Leonard Pepper.
- 1998 – McDermott was unopposed for the September 19, 1998, Republican Primary, winning with 304 votes, and won the November 3, 1998, general election with 2,796 votes (54.9%) against Democratic nominee Wilfred Tangonan.
- 2000 – McDermott was unopposed for the September 23, 2000, Republican Primary, winning with 785 votes, and won the November 7, 2000, general election with 2,686 votes (56.4%) against Democratic nominee Eddie Aguinaldo.
- 2002 – Expecting to challenge incumbent Democratic United States Representative Patsy Mink for Hawaii's 2nd congressional district seat, McDermott won the September 21, 2002, Republican Primary with 20,180 votes (49.5%); Mink had been hospitalized after announcing her re-election candidacy, and died the week after the primary, but too late to be replaced on the general election ballot; she was elected posthumously in the four-way November 5, 2002 General election. McDermott did not run in the November 30, 2002, Special election to succeed her in the interim, as an election to fill the remainder of her term was scheduled for January 4, 2003.
- 2003 – McDermott ran in the 91-candidate Special election on January 4 to succeed Congresswoman Mink, but lost to Ed Case, who had won the interim special election, and held the seat until 2007.
- 2012 – With Democratic Representative Sharon Har redistricted to District 42, McDermott was unopposed in District 40's August 11, 2012, Republican Primary, winning with 754 votes. He won the November 6, 2012, general election with 3,249 votes (48.8%) against Democratic nominee Chris Manabat, who had won the six-way Democratic Primary in a field which included former Representative Romy Mindo.
- 2014 – McDermott beat Democratic candidate Rose Martinez, 60.0% to 36.4%.
- 2016 – McDermott won against Democratic candidate Rose Martinez, 54.6% to 38.5%.
- 2018 – McDermott defeated Democratic candidate Rose Martinez, 53.4% to 42.3%.
- 2020 – McDermott beat Democratic candidate Rose Martinez, 55.7% to 40.4%.
- 2022 – McDermott won the 5-way Republican primary for U.S. Senator from Hawaii with 25,557 votes (31.9%). He faced incumbent Senator Brian Schatz in the November general election and lost the election by a 45% margin. Democratic candidate Rose Martinez won McDermott's former seat, 49.5% to 46.4%, against Republican Janie Gueso.
- 2024 – McDermott won the 6-way Republican primary for U.S. Senator from Hawaii with 27,961 votes (44.9%). He lost to incumbent senator Mazie Hirono in the November general election.

Party political offices
Preceded by John Carroll	Republican nominee for U.S. Senator from Hawaii (Class 3); 2022	Most recent
Preceded by Ron Curtis	Republican nominee for U.S. Senator from Hawaii (Class 1); 2024	Most recent
