= 2024 United States Senate election in Hawaii =

- November 5, 2024
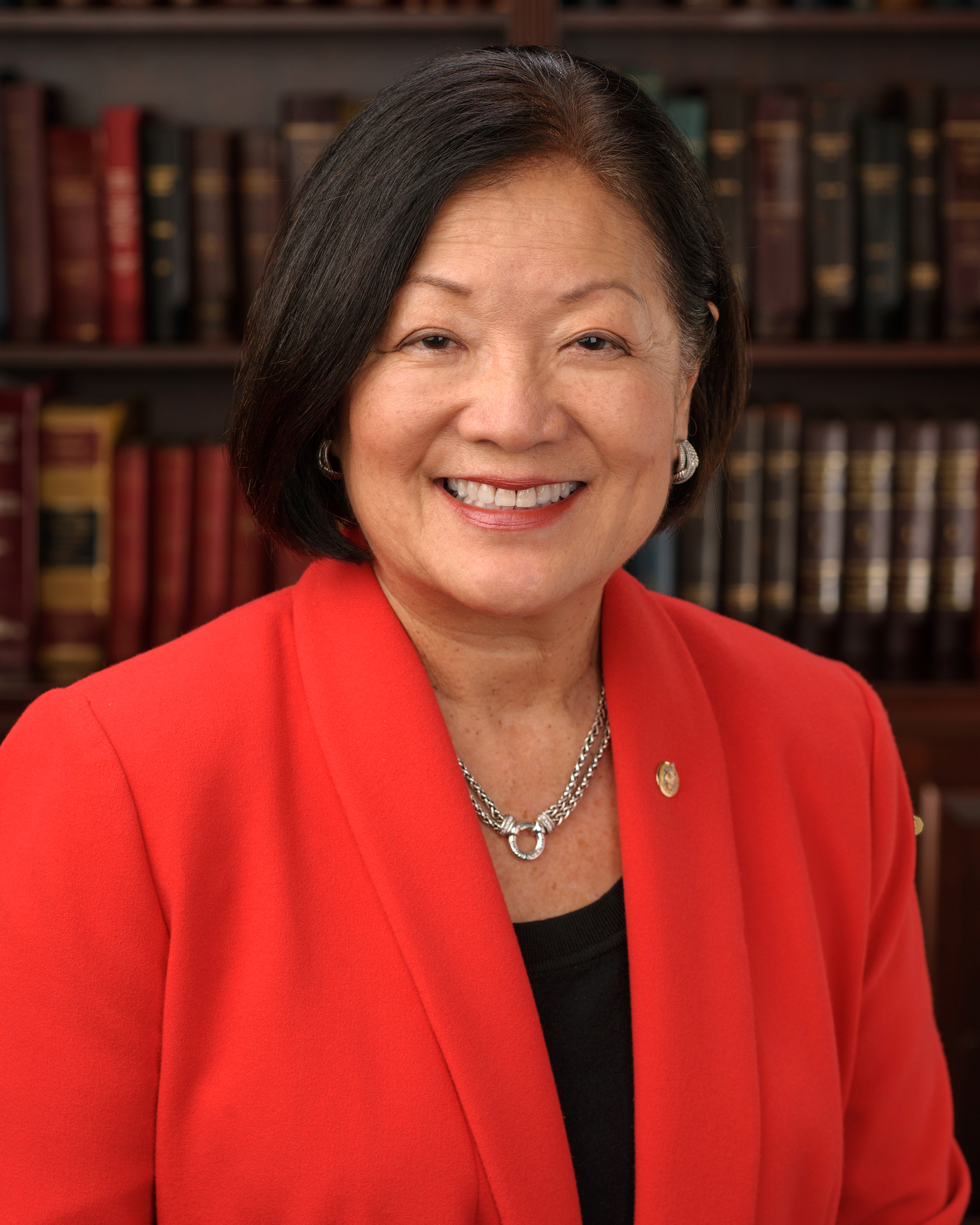

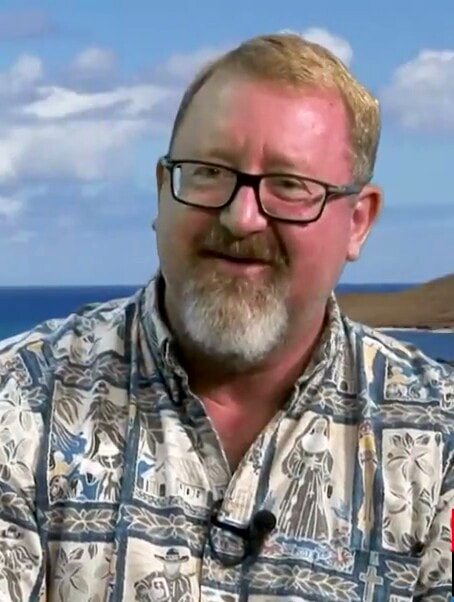
Nominee	Mazie Hirono	Bob McDermott
Party	Democratic	Republican
Popular vote	324,194	160,075
Percentage	64.61%	31.90%
- Hirono: 40–50% 50–60% 60–70% 70–80% 80–90% McDermott: 40–50% 50–60% 60–70% 70–80% No votes
U.S. senator before election
Mazie Hirono
Democratic
Elected U.S. Senator
Mazie Hirono
Democratic

The 2024 United States Senate election in Hawaii was held on November 5, 2024, to elect a member of the United States Senate to represent the state of Hawaii. Democratic two-term incumbent Mazie Hirono defeated Republican former state representative Bob McDermott.

Primary elections took place on August 10, 2024. Hirono won the Democratic nomination with 90% of the vote, while McDermott won the Republican nomination with 51% of the vote in a six-way primary.

Democrats have won every single U.S. senate election in Hawaii since 1974.

== Democratic primary ==
=== Candidates ===
==== Nominee ====
- Mazie Hirono, incumbent U.S. senator

==== Eliminated in primary ====
- Ron Curtis, retired computer engineer and Republican nominee for Hawaii's 1st congressional district in 2020
- Clyde Lewman, realtor and candidate for governor in 2022

=== Endorsements ===
Mazie Hirono

Labor unions

- Association of Flight Attendants
- National Education Association
- National Union of Healthcare Workers

Organizations

- Asian American Action Fund
- EMILY's List
- Feminist Majority PAC
- Humane Society Legislative Fund
- J Street PAC
- Jewish Democratic Council of America
- Joint Action Committee for Political Affairs
- League of Conservation Voters
- National Women's Political Caucus
- Natural Resources Defense Council
- Planned Parenthood Action Fund
- Population Connection Action Fund

=== Fundraising ===
Campaign finance reports as of August 11, 2024
Candidate	Raised	Spent	Cash on hand
Mazie Hirono (D)	$4,387,633	$3,047,072	$2,337,434
Source: Federal Election Commission

=== Results ===
Democratic primary results
Party	Candidate	Votes	%
Democratic	Mazie Hirono (incumbent)	176,131	90.47%
Democratic	Ron Curtis	14,271	7.33%
Democratic	Clyde Lewman	4,287	2.2%
Total votes		194,689	100.0%

== Republican primary ==
=== Candidates ===
==== Nominee ====
- Bob McDermott, former state representative and nominee for U.S. Senate in 2022

==== Eliminated in primary ====
- Melba Amaral, childcare provider
- Paul Dolan, attorney
- Adriel Lam, retired U.S. Army officer
- Arturo Reyes, physician and perennial candidate
- Emmanuel Tipon, attorney

=== Fundraising ===
Campaign finance reports as of August 11, 2024
Candidate	Raised	Spent	Cash on hand
Adriel Lam (R)	$20,265	$15,900	$4,360
Bob McDermott (R)	$2,503	$2,611	$10
Source: Federal Election Commission

=== Results ===
Results by county: McDermott—50–60% McDermott—40–50% No data

Republican primary results
Party	Candidate	Votes	%
Republican	Bob McDermott	27,961	51.87%
Republican	Adriel Lam	8,913	16.54%
Republican	Melba Amaral	7,627	14.15%
Republican	Paul Dolan	4,006	7.43%
Republican	Arturo Reyes	3,319	6.16%
Republican	Emmanuel Tipon	2,075	3.85%
Total votes		53,901	100.0%

== Green primary ==
=== Candidates ===
==== Nominee ====
- Emma Pohlman, attorney and nominee for U.S. Senate in 2022

=== Results ===
Green primary results
Party	Candidate	Votes	%
Green	Emma Pohlman	1,342	100.0%
Total votes		1,342	100.0%

== We the People primary ==
=== Candidates ===
==== Nominee ====
- Shelby Pikachu Billionaire, laborer

=== Results ===
We the People primary results
Party	Candidate	Votes	%
We the People	Shelby Billionaire	977	100.0%
Total votes		977	100.0%

== Independents ==
=== Candidates ===
- John Giuffre, businessman and perennial candidate

==== Declined ====
- Tulsi Gabbard, former Democratic U.S. representative from Hawaii's 2nd congressional district (2013–2021) and candidate for president of the United States in 2020

=== Results ===
Nonpartisan primary results
Party	Candidate	Votes	%
Independent	John Giuffre	966	100.0%
Total votes		966	100.0%

== General election ==
=== Predictions ===
Source	Ranking	As of
Sabato's Crystal Ball	Safe D	November 9, 2023
The Cook Political Report	Solid D	November 9, 2023
Elections Daily	Safe D	May 4, 2023
Decision Desk HQ/The Hill	Safe D	June 8, 2024
Inside Elections	Solid D	November 9, 2023
CNalysis	Solid D	November 21, 2023
RealClearPolitics	Solid D	August 5, 2024
Split Ticket	Safe D	October 23, 2024
538	Solid D	October 23, 2024

=== Results ===

2024 United States Senate election in Hawaii
Party	Candidate	Votes	%	±%
Democratic	Mazie Hirono (incumbent)	324,194	64.61%	−6.54%
Republican	Bob McDermott	160,075	31.90%	+3.05%
We the People	Shelby Billionaire	9,224	1.84%	N/A
Green	Emma Pohlman	8,270	1.65%	N/A
Total votes		501,763	100.0%	N/A
Democratic hold				

==== By county ====
By county

County	Mazie Hirono Democratic		Bob McDermott Republican		All Others	
County	#	%	#	%	#	%
Hawaii	54,691	67.92%	22,747	28.25%	3,079	3.83%
Honolulu	209,780	63.12%	111,603	33.58%	10,953	3.3%
Kauaʻi	18,934	66.45%	8,537	29.96%	1,024	3.59%
Maui	40,789	67.51%	17,188	28.45%	2,438	4.03%
Totals	324,194	64.61%	160,075	31.9%	17,494	3.49%

==== By congressional district ====
Hirono won both congressional districts.

District	Hirono	McDermott	Representative
1st	64.8%	32.0%	Ed Case
2nd	64.5%	31.8%	Jill Tokuda
