= 2026 Hawaii elections =

Elections in the U.S. state of Hawaii in 2026

- 2026

A general election in Hawaii was held on November 3, 2026. Primary elections took place on August 8, 2026. Officers for various federal, state, and local positions will be elected.

The candidate filing period began on February 2, 2026 and ended on June 2, 2026.

Organizations that sought to become qualified political parties must have submitted petitions with 861 signatures by February 19, 2026, to qualify for the ballot. In addition to the Democratic and Republican major parties, the Libertarian Party was qualified to field candidates for the general election ballot. After being disqualified due to its performance in the 2024 Hawaii elections, the Hawaii Green Party successfully petitioned to be placed back on the ballot.

== Federal elections ==
=== U.S. House of Representatives ===
Both members of the United States House of Representatives from Hawaii will be elected.

Party	2024 gen.	Current (Note: As of May 30, 2025)	Won
Democratic	2	2	TBD
Republican	0	0	TBD
Vacant	—	0	—

== State legislative elections ==
=== State Senate ===
13 of the 25 members of the Hawaii Senate will be elected.

Party	2024 gen.	Current (Note: As of May 30, 2025)	Up	Won	After
Democratic	22	22	12	TBD	TBD
Republican	3	3	1	TBD	TBD
Vacant	—	0	0	—	—

=== State House ===
All 51 members of the Hawaii House of Representatives will be elected.

Party	2024 gen.	Current (Note: As of April 13, 2026)	Won
Democratic	42	41	44
Republican	9	10	6
Green	0	0	1
Vacant	—	—	—

== Office of Hawaiian Affairs election ==
Five of the nine Office of Hawaiian Affairs trustee seats are up for election in 2026 (one Oahu, one Maui, and three At-Large seats). Trustees serve staggered 4-year terms.

Constituency	Incumbent	Elected
At-large	Keoni Souza	TBD
Oahu	Kalei Akaka	TBD
At-large	Brickwood Galuteria	TBD
Maui	Carmen Hulu Lindsey	TBD
At-large	John Waihee IV	TBD

== Ballot measures ==
There are two proposed amendments to the Constitution of Hawaii on the general election ballot.

=== Question 1 ===
- November 3, 2026
- Increasing the Timeframe for the Hawaii Senate to Consider and Act on Judicial Appointments.
- Note: 50% of all ballots cast must be in favor of the amendment in order for it to pass, with blank ballots acting as "no" votes.

SB 121, or the Increase Time for Senate to Act on Judicial Appointments Amendment would increase the time the Hawaii Senate has to approve or reject a judicial appointment from 30 days to 60 days, if the appointment was made between April 1 and December 31. Under current law, any judicial appointment not acted upon by the Senate is automatically confirmed. Typically, the Senate is in session from January to early May, so if the Senate wants to review a judicial nominee after May, a special session is required to convene.

==== Text ====
"Shall the Constitution of the State of Hawaii be amended to allow the Senate more time to consider and act on the appointments of justices and judges, by increasing the timeframe from thirty days to sixty days for appointments made between April 1 and December 31 when the senate is not in regular session or is about to adjourn the regular session?"

=== Question 2 ===
- November 3, 2026
- Directing the Hawaii State Legislature to Establish Procedures for Counties to Issue RISE Bonds, Exempt from County Debt Limits
- Note: 50% of all ballots cast must be in favor of the amendment in order for it to pass, with blank ballots acting as "no" votes.

==== Text ====
"Shall the Hawaii State Constitution be amended to direct the legislature to authorize the counties to issue resilient infrastructure for shelter and equity bonds to fund public improvements in designated districts, repaid solely by future growth in property tax revenues within those districts, not by increasing real property tax rates, where such bonds are excluded from the counties’ debt limit and are subject to accountability and oversight requirements as may be provided by law?"

=== Local questions ===
Honolulu Question 5 would require the use of ranked-choice voting in city elections, replacing its current two-round system.

== Local elections ==
Local elections in Hawaii are nonpartisan. Every county with its own government has voted to make their elections nonpartisan, beginning with Honolulu County in 1992 and ending with Hawaii County in 2000. Kalawao has no county government.

=== Hawaii County ===
Hawaii County will hold a county council election in 2026.

==== County council ====
All nine members of the county council are up for election. Council members in Hawaii County serve 2-year terms.

=== Honolulu County ===
Honolulu County, a consolidated city-county, will hold a county council election in 2026. Mayoral elections in the county take place on presidential election years.

==== County council ====
Four of the nine county council districts are up for election in 2026 (2, 4, 6, and 8). Council members in Honolulu County serve staggered 4-year terms.

District	Incumbent	Elected
II	Matt Weyer (NP–D)	TBD
IV	Tommy Waters (NP–D)	TBD
VI	Tyler Dos Santos-Tam (NP–D)	TBD
VIII	Val Okimoto (NP–R)	TBD

=== Kauaʻi County ===
Kauaʻi County will hold a mayoral election and a county council election in 2026.

==== Mayor ====
Two-term incumbent Democratic mayor Derek Kawakami is barred from seeking a third consecutive term due to term limits. Former mayor Bernard Carvalho and incumbent county council chairman Mel Rapozo have both announced their intention to run.

==== County council ====
All seven seats of the county council are up for election in 2026. Four seats are open, as two incumbent council members are running for mayor and two are barred due to term limits. Council members in Kauaʻi County serve 2-year terms.

=== Maui County ===
Maui County will hold a mayoral election and a county council election in 2026.

==== Mayor ====
The incumbent mayor of Maui County is Richard Bissen, first elected in 2022. Incumbent county council vice chairwoman Yuki Lei Sugimura announced her intention to run. P. Denise LaCosta challenges the incumbent.

==== County council ====
All nine seats of the county council are up for election in 2026. Council members in Maui County serve 2-year terms.
