= 1998 United States Senate election in Hawaii =

- November 3, 1998
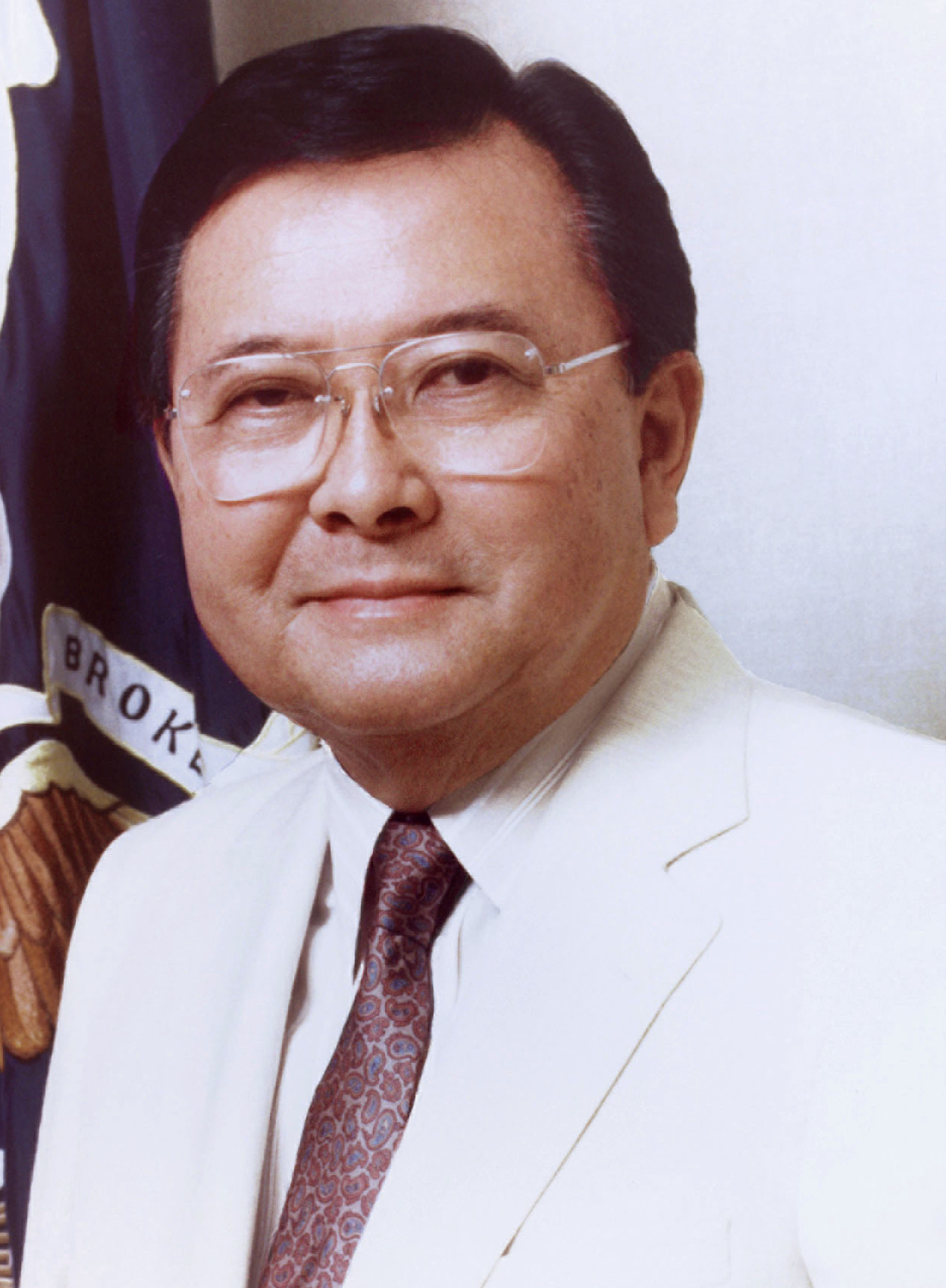

Nominee	Daniel Inouye	Crystal Young
Party	Democratic	Republican
Popular vote	315,252	70,964
Percentage	79.18%	17.82%
- County results Inouye: 70–80% 80–90%
U.S. senator before election
Daniel Inouye
Democratic
Elected U.S. Senator
Daniel Inouye
Democratic

The 1998 United States Senate election in Hawaii was held November 3, 1998 alongside other elections to the United States Senate in other states as well as elections to the United States House of Representatives and various state and local elections. Incumbent Democratic U.S. Senator Daniel Inouye won re-election to a seventh term.

== Major candidates ==
=== Democratic ===
- Daniel Inouye, incumbent U.S. Senator

=== Republican ===
- Crystal Young, legislative aide

== Results ==
General election results
Party	Candidate	Votes	%	±%
Democratic	Daniel Inouye (incumbent)	315,252	79.18%	+21.91%
Republican	Crystal Young	70,964	17.82%	−9.11%
Libertarian	Lloyd Mallan	11,908	2.99%	+0.91%
Majority		244,288	61.36%	
Turnout		398,124		
Democratic hold				

=== By county ===
County	Daniel Inouye Democratic		Crystal Young Republican		Jeff Mallan Libertarian		Margin		Total votes cast
County	#	%	#	%	#	%	#	%	Total votes cast
Hawaii	38,844	74.8%	10,840	20.9%	2,223	4.3%	28,004	53.9%	51,907
Honolulu	224,619	79.8%	48,941	17.4%	7,831	2.8%	175,678	62.4%	281,391
Kauaʻi	19,463	84.1%	3,097	13.4%	593	2.5%	16,366	70.7%	23,153
Maui	32,326	77.6%	8,086	19.4%	1,261	3.0%	24,240	58.2%	41,673
Totals	315,252	79.2%	70,964	17.8%	11,908	3.0%	244,288	61.4%	398,124

== See also ==
- 1998 United States Senate elections
