= 1992 United States Senate election in Hawaii =

- November 3, 1992
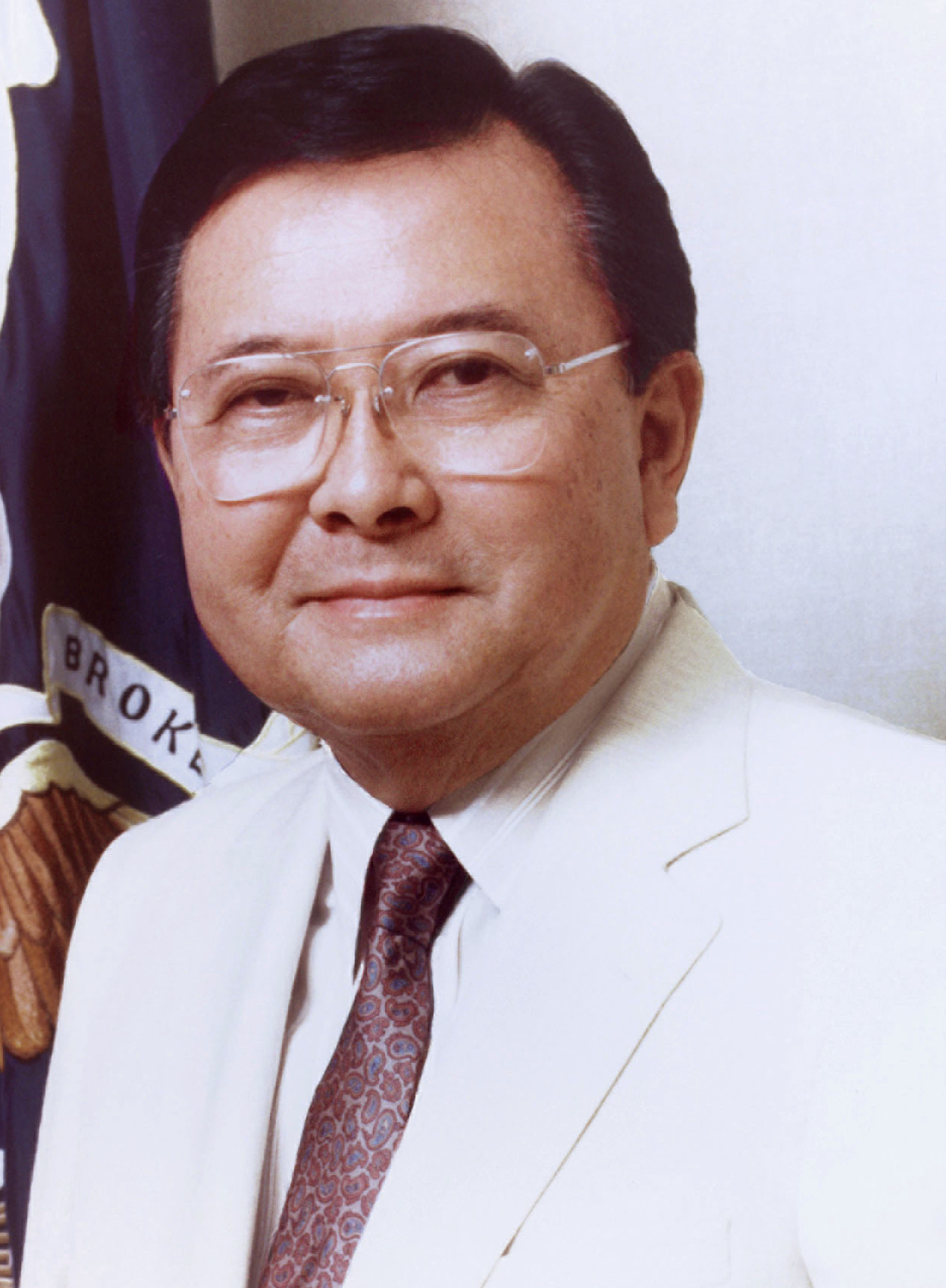

Nominee	Daniel Inouye	Rick Reed	Linda Martin
Party	Democratic	Republican	Green
Popular vote	208,266	97,928	49,921
Percentage	57.27%	26.93%	13.73%
- County results Inouye: 50–60% 70–80%
U.S. senator before election
Daniel Inouye
Democratic
Elected U.S. Senator
Daniel Inouye
Democratic

The 1992 United States Senate election in Hawaii took place on November 3, 1992, alongside other elections to the United States Senate in other states as well as elections to the United States House of Representatives and various state and local elections. Incumbent Democratic U.S. Senator Daniel Inouye won re-election to a sixth term.

== General election ==
=== Candidates ===
- Daniel Inouye, incumbent U.S. Senator (Democratic)
- Linda Martin (Green)
- Rick Reed, state senator (Republican)
- Richard O. Rowland (Libertarian)

=== Sexual assault allegation against Inouye ===
During the campaign, Lenore Kwock, Inouye's hairdresser, accused him of sexually assaulting her in 1975. She had not originally intended to make the accusation publicly, but was tricked into doing so by an operative from Reed's campaign, who secretly recorded her speaking about the incident after posing as a prospective aide for Inouye. Kwock threatened to sue once audio from this conversation was put in one of Reed's campaign ads without her permission. She then went public with the allegation on her own terms, and took and passed a polygraph test, while Inouye refused to take one.

Inouye denied the accusation, but an opinion poll showed that more than twice as many Hawaii voters believed Kwock over him. State Representative Annelle Amaral said that she was privately contacted by nine other women who accused Inouye of sexual misconduct, but none wanted to speak publicly. Inouye faced no real backlash from the accusation: his vast influence over Hawaii's political establishment meant that "cowardice" and "lack of opportunity" shielded him, according to a political scientist at the University of Hawaii. After Amaral publicly supported Kwock, she was removed from her position on the judiciary committee and lost re-election. Further allegations against Inouye were reported after his death.

=== Results ===
General election results
Party	Candidate	Votes	%	±%
Democratic	Daniel Inouye (incumbent)	208,266	57.27%	−16.30%
Republican	Rick Reed	97,928	26.93%	+0.50%
Green	Linda Martin	49,921	13.73%	N/A
Libertarian	Richard O. Rowland	7,547	2.08%	N/A
Democratic hold		Swing		

==== By county ====
County	Daniel Inouye Democratic		Rick Reed Republican		Linda Martin Green		Richard Rowland Libertarian		Margin		Total votes cast
County	#	%	#	%	#	%	#	%	#	%	Total votes cast
Hawaii	27,461	62.1%	15,130	34.2%	671	1.5%	925	2.1%	12,331	27.9%	44,187
Honolulu	148,831	57.6%	66,094	25.6%	37,720	14.6%	5,758	2.2%	82,737	32.0%	258,403
Kauaʻi	13,213	71.0%	4,058	21.8%	1,078	5.8%	253	1.4%	9,155	49.2%	18,602
Maui	18,761	51.5%	12,646	34.7%	4,406	12.1%	609	1.7%	6,115	16.8%	36,422
Totals	208,266	57.3%	97,928	26.9%	49,921	13.7%	7,547	2.1%	110,338	30.4%	363,662

== See also ==
- 1992 United States Senate elections
