= 1986 United States Senate election in Hawaii =

- November 4, 1986
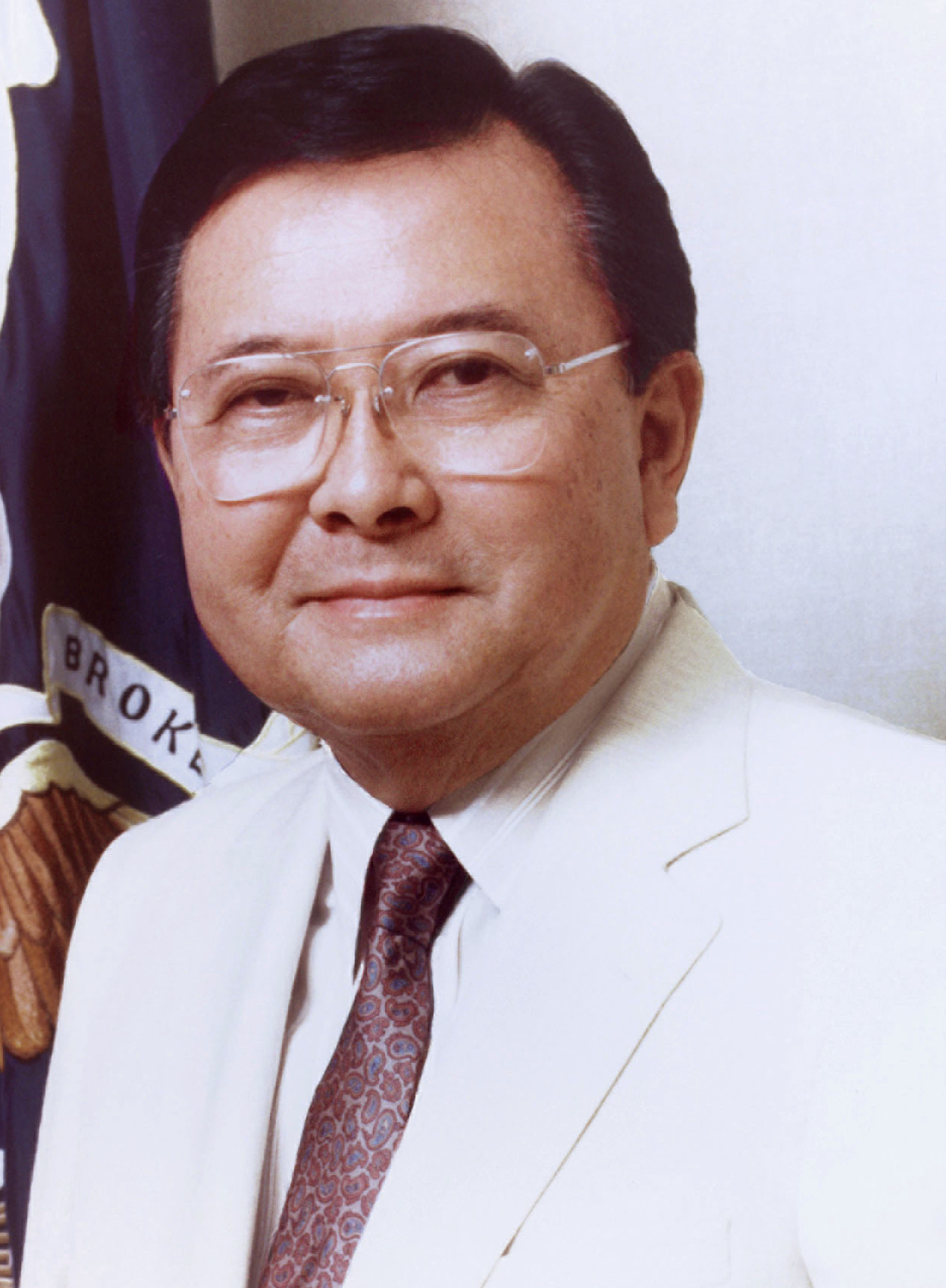

Nominee	Daniel Inouye	Frank Hutchinson
Party	Democratic	Republican
Popular vote	241,887	86,910
Percentage	73.57%	26.43%
- County results Inouye: 70–80% 80–90%
U.S. senator before election
Daniel Inouye
Democratic
Elected U.S. Senator
Daniel Inouye
Democratic

The 1986 United States Senate election in Hawaii was held on November 4, 1986.

Incumbent Senator Daniel Inouye was re-elected to a fifth term in office.

== Democratic primary ==
=== Candidates ===
- Daniel Inouye, incumbent Senator

=== Results ===
Senator Inouye was unopposed for renomination by the Democratic Party.

== Republican primary ==
=== Candidates ===
- Marvin Franklin, Waikiki pedicab driver and former U.S.M.C. Life Guard.
- Frank Hutchinson, businessman and retired United States Marine Corps officer

=== Results ===
1986 Republican U.S. Senate primary
Party	Candidate	Votes	%
Republican	Frank Hutchinson	20,375	67.72%
Republican	Marvin Franklin	9,714	32.28%
Total votes		30,089	100.00%

== General election ==
=== Results ===
General election results
Party	Candidate	Votes	%	±%
Democratic	Daniel Inouye (incumbent)	241,887	73.57%	▼4.37
Republican	Frank Hutchinson	86,910	26.43%	▲8.00
Total votes		328,797	100.00%	
Democratic hold		Swing		

=== By county ===
County	Daniel Inouye Democratic		Frank Hutchinson Republican		Margin		Total votes cast
County	#	%	#	%	#	%	Total votes cast
Hawaii	28,245	73.2%	10,367	26.8%	17,878	46.4%	38,612
Honolulu	176,828	72.8%	66,008	27.2%	110,820	45.6%	242,836
Kauaʻi	14,419	80.4%	3,510	19.6%	10,909	60.8%	17,929
Maui	22,377	76.1%	7,010	23.9%	15,367	52.2%	29,387
Totals	241,887	73.6%	86,910	26.4%	154,977	47.2%	328,797

== See also ==
- 1986 United States Senate elections
