= 1980 United States Senate election in Hawaii =

- November 4, 1980
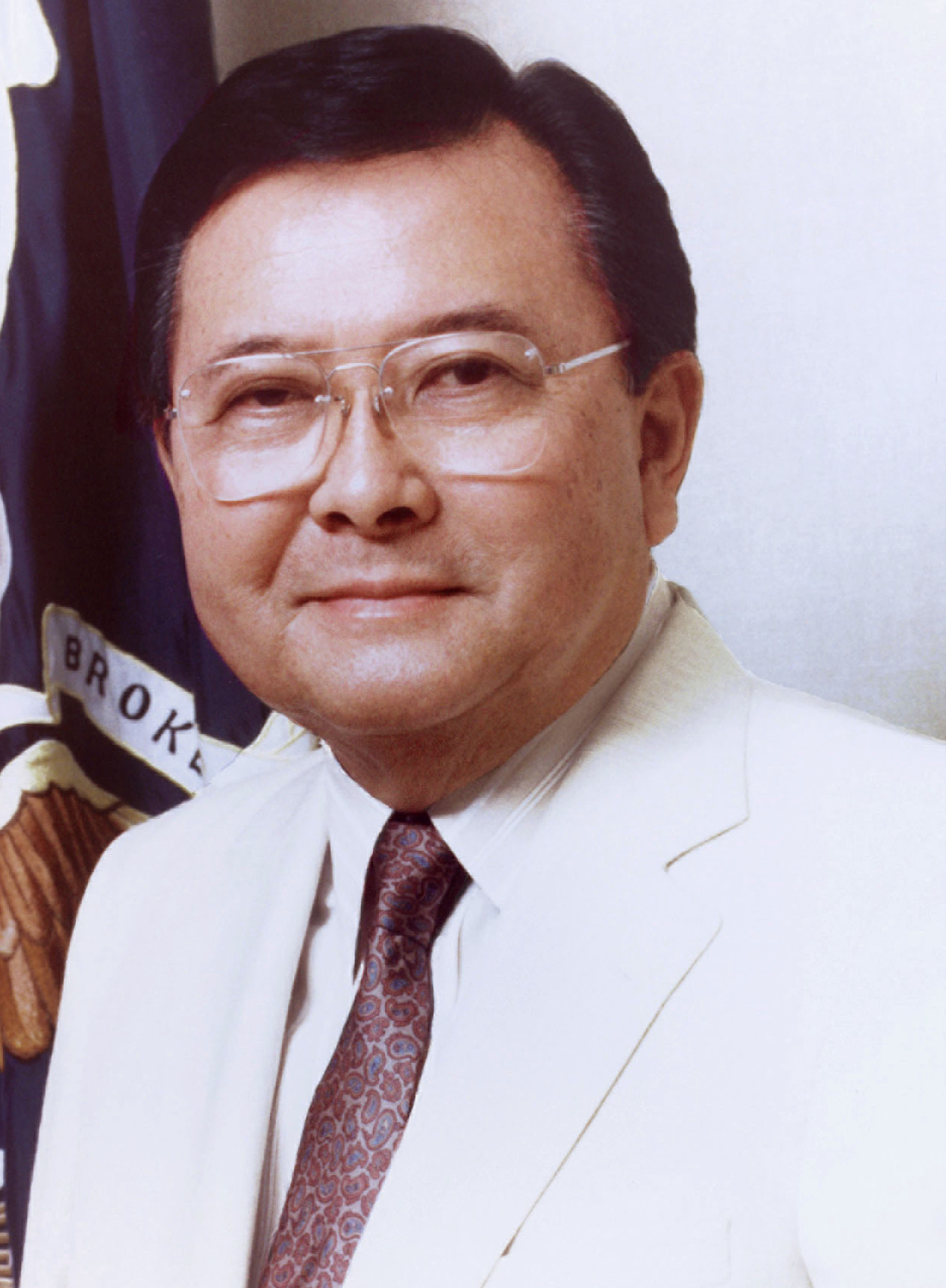

Nominee	Daniel Inouye	Cooper Brown
Party	Democratic	Republican
Popular vote	224,485	53,068
Percentage	77.95%	18.43%
- County results Inouye: 70–80% 80–90%
U.S. senator before election
Daniel Inouye
Democratic
Elected U.S. Senator
Daniel Inouye
Democratic

The 1980 United States Senate election in Hawaii took place on November 4, 1980.

Incumbent Democratic U.S. Senator Daniel Inouye won re-election to a fourth term in yet another landslide, despite the national 'Reagan Revolution' and the state's very narrow margin of victory for Jimmy Carter in the concurrent presidential election.

Hawaii was the only state to vote for the Democratic candidate for both Senate and president in 1980, as three of the other states that voted for Jimmy Carter in 1980 didn't have Senate elections that year, and Georgia and Maryland both voted for Republicans for Senate.

== Democratic primary ==
=== Candidates ===
- Daniel Inouye, incumbent Senator
- John P. Fritz, candidate for State House in 1976 and 1978
- Kamuela Price, candidate for Senate in 1976

=== Results ===
Democratic Senate primary
Party	Candidate	Votes	%
Democratic	Daniel Inouye (incumbent)	198,468	87.52%
Democratic	Kamuela Price	15,361	6.77%
Democratic	John P. Fritz	12,929	5.70%
Total votes		226,758	100.00%

== Republican primary ==
=== Candidates ===
- Floyd Bernier-Nachtwey, People's Party candidate for Senate in 1974
- Cooper Brown
- Dan Dew
- Lawrence I. Weisman

=== Results ===
Republican Senate primary
Party	Candidate	Votes	%
Republican	Cooper Brown	3,219	39.05%
Republican	Lawrence I. Weisman	2,586	31.37%
Republican	Dan Dew	1,854	22.49%
Republican	Floyd Bernier-Nachtwey	584	7.09%
Total votes		8,243	100.00%

== General election ==
=== Results ===
1980 United States Senate election in Hawaii
Party	Candidate	Votes	%	±%
Democratic	Daniel Inouye (Incumbent)	224,485	77.95%	▼4.96
Republican	Cooper Brown	53,068	18.43%	N/A
Libertarian	H. E. Shasteen	10,453	3.63%	N/A
Democratic hold		Swing		

=== By county ===
County	Daniel Inouye Democratic		Cooper Brown Republican		H.E. Shasteen Libertarian		Margin		Total votes cast
County	#	%	#	%	#	%	#	%	Total votes cast
Hawaii	26,495	77.4%	6,386	18.7%	1,349	3.9%	20,109	58.7%	34,230
Honolulu	166,634	77.5%	40,681	18.9%	7,764	3.6%	125,953	58.6%	215,079
Kauaʻi	12,808	84.8%	1,898	12.6%	389	2.6%	10,910	76.2%	15,095
Maui	18,513	78.6%	4,091	17.4%	946	4.0%	14,422	61.2%	23,550
Totals	224,485	77.9%	53,068	18.4%	10,453	3.6%	171,417	58.5%	288,006

== See also ==
- 1980 United States Senate elections
