= USS Oliver H. Lee =

Gunboat of the United States Navy

History

United States
- Acquired: 27 August 1861
- Commissioned: 4 February 1862
- Decommissioned: 14 June 1862
- In service: 23 August 1862
- Out of service: 19 July 1865
- Fate: Sold, 10 August 1865

General characteristics
- Displacement: 199 tons
- Length: 100 ft 9 in (30.71 m)
- Beam: 28 ft 4 in (8.64 m)
- Depth of hold: 8 ft (2.4 m)
- Propulsion: sail
- Speed: 11 knots (20 km/h; 13 mph)
- Complement: 37
- Armament: 2 × 32-pounder guns; 1 × 13 in (330 mm) mortar; 2 × heavy 12-pounder smoothbores

USS Oliver H. Lee was a schooner acquired by the Union Navy during the American Civil War. She was used by the Navy to patrol navigable waterways of the Confederacy to prevent the South from trading with other countries as part of the Union blockade.

== Service history ==
Oliver H. Lee was purchased by the Navy at New York City 27 August 1861 from Charles Clark; and commissioned at New York Navy Yard 4 February 1862; Acting Master Washington Godfrey in command. One of 21 schooners fitted out with mortars for a bomb flotilla organized by Comdr. David Dixon Porter to support Flag Officer David Farragut's deep draft ships in their attack on New Orleans, Louisiana, Oliver H. Lee, sailed down the Atlantic coast, across the Gulf of Mexico and into the Mississippi River through Pass a l' Outre. In position below Fort St. Philip and Fort Jackson, 18 April 1862, Oliver H. Lee and her sister schooners opened fire and maintained the barrage on the Confederate fortifications until the 24th when Farragut's salt water ships had raced passed the forts. The next day New Orleans surrendered.

The schooner subsequently supported operations on the Mississippi River especially against Vicksburg and served in the Gulf of Mexico. Sailing north for repairs, she nearly foundered from leaks through old shot holes but was saved by assistance from Vicksburg and steamed to Beaufort, North Carolina. She later decommissioned at New York City 14 June. Recommissioned 23 August, the schooner served in Florida waters for the remainder of the Civil War. She captured cotton laden schooner Sort flying English colors near Anclote Keys 10 December and participated in operations near St. Marks, Florida, in February and March 1865. After hostilities ceased, Oliver H. Lee decommissioned at Philadelphia, Pennsylvania, 19 July 1865 and was sold at public auction there 10 August 1865.
