= List of United States senators from Hawaii =

Current delegation

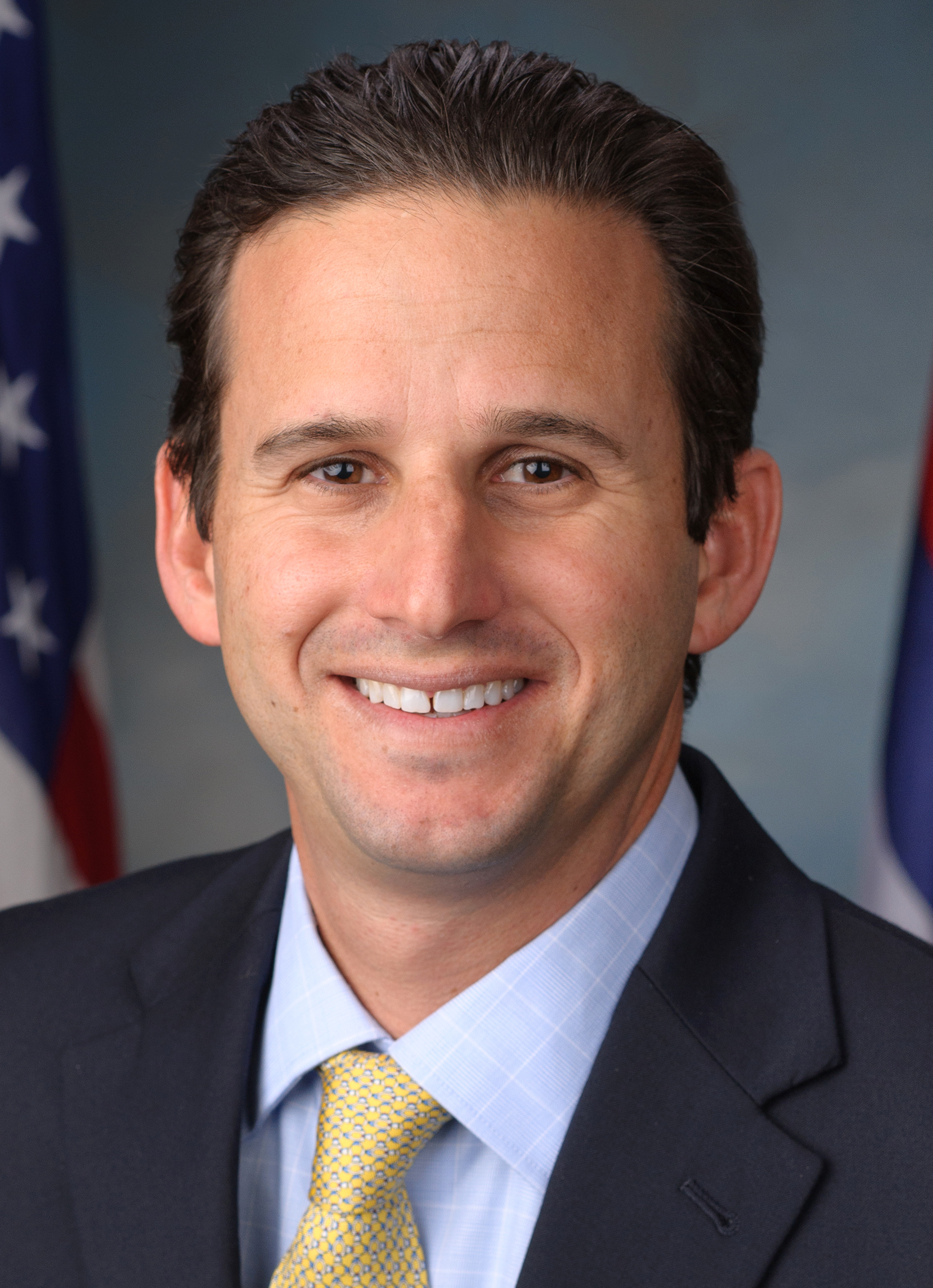
Brian Schatz (D)

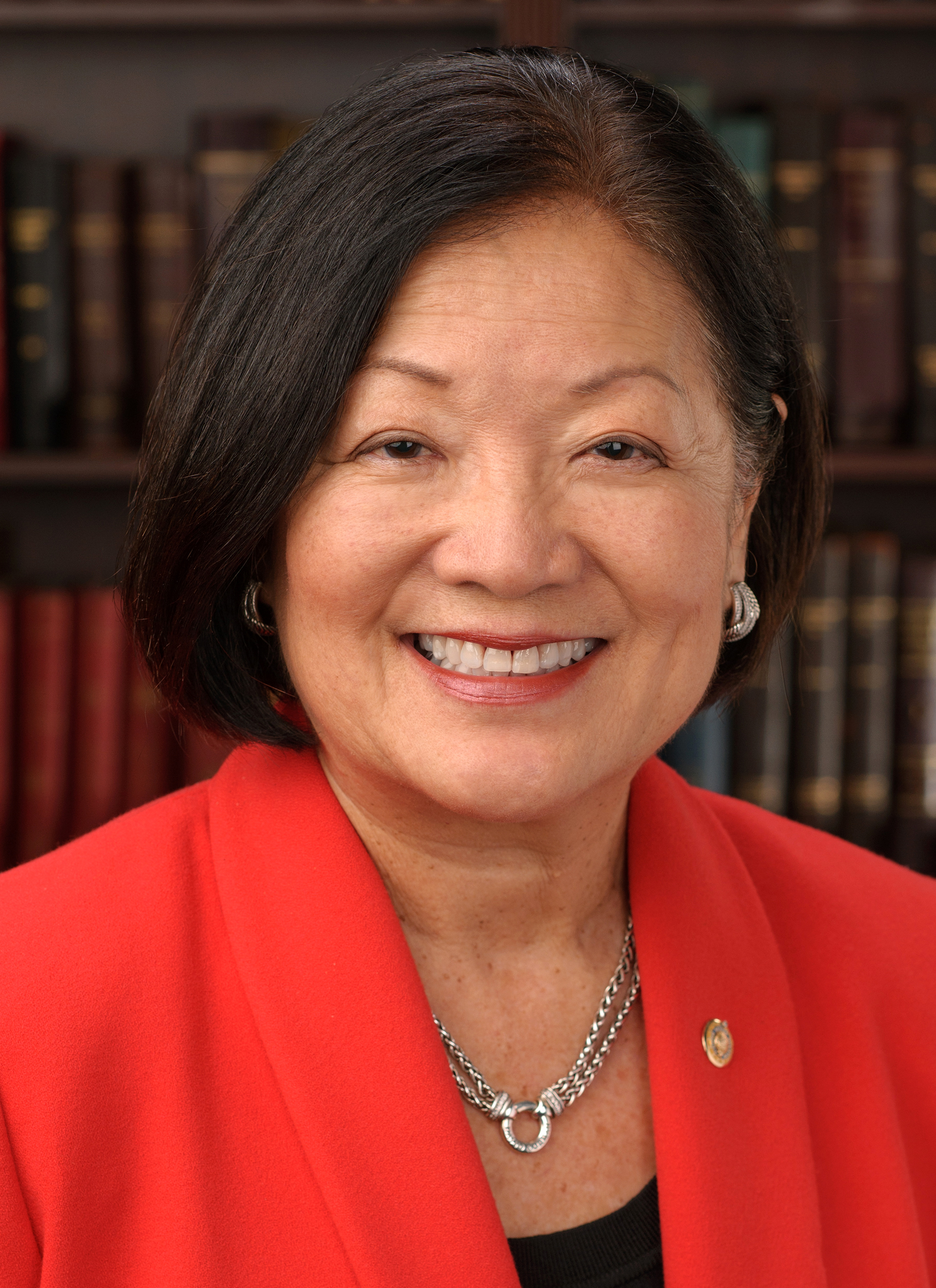
Mazie Hirono (D)

(ordered by seniority)

Hawaii was admitted to the Union on August 21, 1959, and elects U.S. senators to classes 1 and 3. Seven people including only one Republican have served as a U.S. senator from Hawaii. The state's current U.S. senators are Democrats Brian Schatz and Mazie Hirono. Hawaii's class 1 seat is the only one in the United States that has always been held by an ethnic minority. Its class 3 seat is the only one in the United States that has always been held by a member of the Democratic Party.

Hawaii last elected a Republican in 1970, which has resulted in the longest streak in the nation for a state's having all-Democratic senators. Daniel K. Inouye was Hawaii's longest-serving senator, from 1963 to 2012. Hawaii is the only U.S. state that has never defeated an incumbent senator in either a primary or general election.

== List of senators ==
Class 1 Class 1 senators belong to the electoral cycle that most recently had regular elections in 2006, 2012, 2018, and 2024. The next election will be in 2030.						C	Class 3 Class 3 senators belong to the electoral cycle that most recently had regular elections in 2004, 2010, 2016, and 2022. The next election will be in 2028.					
#	Senator	Party	Dates in office	Electoral history	T	C	T	Electoral history	Dates in office	Party	Senator	#
1	Hiram Fong (Honolulu)	Republican	Aug 21, 1959 – Jan 3, 1977	Elected in 1959.	1	86th	1	Elected in 1959. Retired.	Aug 21, 1959 – Jan 3, 1963	Democratic	Oren E. Long (Honolulu)	1
1	Hiram Fong (Honolulu)	Republican	Aug 21, 1959 – Jan 3, 1977	Elected in 1959.	1	87th	1	Elected in 1959. Retired.	Aug 21, 1959 – Jan 3, 1963	Democratic	Oren E. Long (Honolulu)	1
1	Hiram Fong (Honolulu)	Republican	Aug 21, 1959 – Jan 3, 1977	Elected in 1959.	1	88th	2	Elected in 1962.	Jan 3, 1963 – Dec 17, 2012	Democratic	Daniel Inouye (Honolulu)	2
1	Hiram Fong (Honolulu)	Republican	Aug 21, 1959 – Jan 3, 1977	Re-elected in 1964.	2	89th	2	Elected in 1962.	Jan 3, 1963 – Dec 17, 2012	Democratic	Daniel Inouye (Honolulu)	2
1	Hiram Fong (Honolulu)	Republican	Aug 21, 1959 – Jan 3, 1977	Re-elected in 1964.	2	90th	2	Elected in 1962.	Jan 3, 1963 – Dec 17, 2012	Democratic	Daniel Inouye (Honolulu)	2
1	Hiram Fong (Honolulu)	Republican	Aug 21, 1959 – Jan 3, 1977	Re-elected in 1964.	2	91st	3	Re-elected in 1968.	Jan 3, 1963 – Dec 17, 2012	Democratic	Daniel Inouye (Honolulu)	2
1	Hiram Fong (Honolulu)	Republican	Aug 21, 1959 – Jan 3, 1977	Re-elected in 1970. Retired.	3	92nd	3	Re-elected in 1968.	Jan 3, 1963 – Dec 17, 2012	Democratic	Daniel Inouye (Honolulu)	2
1	Hiram Fong (Honolulu)	Republican	Aug 21, 1959 – Jan 3, 1977	Re-elected in 1970. Retired.	3	93rd	3	Re-elected in 1968.	Jan 3, 1963 – Dec 17, 2012	Democratic	Daniel Inouye (Honolulu)	2
1	Hiram Fong (Honolulu)	Republican	Aug 21, 1959 – Jan 3, 1977	Re-elected in 1970. Retired.	3	94th	4	Re-elected in 1974.	Jan 3, 1963 – Dec 17, 2012	Democratic	Daniel Inouye (Honolulu)	2
2	Spark Matsunaga (Honolulu)	Democratic	Jan 3, 1977 – Apr 15, 1990	Elected in 1976.	4	95th	4	Re-elected in 1974.	Jan 3, 1963 – Dec 17, 2012	Democratic	Daniel Inouye (Honolulu)	2
2	Spark Matsunaga (Honolulu)	Democratic	Jan 3, 1977 – Apr 15, 1990	Elected in 1976.	4	96th	4	Re-elected in 1974.	Jan 3, 1963 – Dec 17, 2012	Democratic	Daniel Inouye (Honolulu)	2
2	Spark Matsunaga (Honolulu)	Democratic	Jan 3, 1977 – Apr 15, 1990	Elected in 1976.	4	97th	5	Re-elected in 1980.	Jan 3, 1963 – Dec 17, 2012	Democratic	Daniel Inouye (Honolulu)	2
2	Spark Matsunaga (Honolulu)	Democratic	Jan 3, 1977 – Apr 15, 1990	Re-elected in 1982.	5	98th	5	Re-elected in 1980.	Jan 3, 1963 – Dec 17, 2012	Democratic	Daniel Inouye (Honolulu)	2
2	Spark Matsunaga (Honolulu)	Democratic	Jan 3, 1977 – Apr 15, 1990	Re-elected in 1982.	5	99th	5	Re-elected in 1980.	Jan 3, 1963 – Dec 17, 2012	Democratic	Daniel Inouye (Honolulu)	2
2	Spark Matsunaga (Honolulu)	Democratic	Jan 3, 1977 – Apr 15, 1990	Re-elected in 1982.	5	100th	6	Re-elected in 1986.	Jan 3, 1963 – Dec 17, 2012	Democratic	Daniel Inouye (Honolulu)	2
2	Spark Matsunaga (Honolulu)	Democratic	Jan 3, 1977 – Apr 15, 1990	Re-elected in 1988. Died.	6	101st	6	Re-elected in 1986.	Jan 3, 1963 – Dec 17, 2012	Democratic	Daniel Inouye (Honolulu)	2
Vacant			Apr 15, 1990 – May 16, 1990		6	101st	6	Re-elected in 1986.	Jan 3, 1963 – Dec 17, 2012	Democratic	Daniel Inouye (Honolulu)	2
3	Daniel Akaka (Honolulu)	Democratic	May 16, 1990 – Jan 3, 2013	Appointed to continue Matsunaga's term. Elected in 1990 to finish Matsunaga's term.	6	101st	6	Re-elected in 1986.	Jan 3, 1963 – Dec 17, 2012	Democratic	Daniel Inouye (Honolulu)	2
3	Daniel Akaka (Honolulu)	Democratic	May 16, 1990 – Jan 3, 2013	Appointed to continue Matsunaga's term. Elected in 1990 to finish Matsunaga's term.	6	102nd	6	Re-elected in 1986.	Jan 3, 1963 – Dec 17, 2012	Democratic	Daniel Inouye (Honolulu)	2
3	Daniel Akaka (Honolulu)	Democratic	May 16, 1990 – Jan 3, 2013	Appointed to continue Matsunaga's term. Elected in 1990 to finish Matsunaga's term.	6	103rd	7	Re-elected in 1992.	Jan 3, 1963 – Dec 17, 2012	Democratic	Daniel Inouye (Honolulu)	2
3	Daniel Akaka (Honolulu)	Democratic	May 16, 1990 – Jan 3, 2013	Re-elected in 1994.	7	104th	7	Re-elected in 1992.	Jan 3, 1963 – Dec 17, 2012	Democratic	Daniel Inouye (Honolulu)	2
3	Daniel Akaka (Honolulu)	Democratic	May 16, 1990 – Jan 3, 2013	Re-elected in 1994.	7	105th	7	Re-elected in 1992.	Jan 3, 1963 – Dec 17, 2012	Democratic	Daniel Inouye (Honolulu)	2
3	Daniel Akaka (Honolulu)	Democratic	May 16, 1990 – Jan 3, 2013	Re-elected in 1994.	7	106th	8	Re-elected in 1998.	Jan 3, 1963 – Dec 17, 2012	Democratic	Daniel Inouye (Honolulu)	2
3	Daniel Akaka (Honolulu)	Democratic	May 16, 1990 – Jan 3, 2013	Re-elected in 2000.	8	107th	8	Re-elected in 1998.	Jan 3, 1963 – Dec 17, 2012	Democratic	Daniel Inouye (Honolulu)	2
3	Daniel Akaka (Honolulu)	Democratic	May 16, 1990 – Jan 3, 2013	Re-elected in 2000.	8	108th	8	Re-elected in 1998.	Jan 3, 1963 – Dec 17, 2012	Democratic	Daniel Inouye (Honolulu)	2
3	Daniel Akaka (Honolulu)	Democratic	May 16, 1990 – Jan 3, 2013	Re-elected in 2000.	8	109th	9	Re-elected in 2004.	Jan 3, 1963 – Dec 17, 2012	Democratic	Daniel Inouye (Honolulu)	2
3	Daniel Akaka (Honolulu)	Democratic	May 16, 1990 – Jan 3, 2013	Re-elected in 2006. Retired.	9	110th	9	Re-elected in 2004.	Jan 3, 1963 – Dec 17, 2012	Democratic	Daniel Inouye (Honolulu)	2
3	Daniel Akaka (Honolulu)	Democratic	May 16, 1990 – Jan 3, 2013	Re-elected in 2006. Retired.	9	111th	9	Re-elected in 2004.	Jan 3, 1963 – Dec 17, 2012	Democratic	Daniel Inouye (Honolulu)	2
3	Daniel Akaka (Honolulu)	Democratic	May 16, 1990 – Jan 3, 2013	Re-elected in 2006. Retired.	9	112th	10	Re-elected in 2010. Died.	Jan 3, 1963 – Dec 17, 2012	Democratic	Daniel Inouye (Honolulu)	2
3	Daniel Akaka (Honolulu)	Democratic	May 16, 1990 – Jan 3, 2013	Re-elected in 2006. Retired.	9	112th	10		Dec 17, 2012 – Dec 26, 2012	Vacant		
3	Daniel Akaka (Honolulu)	Democratic	May 16, 1990 – Jan 3, 2013	Re-elected in 2006. Retired.	9	112th	10	Appointed to continue Inouye's term. Elected in 2014 to finish Inouye's term.	Dec 26, 2012 – present	Democratic	Brian Schatz (Honolulu)	3
4	Mazie Hirono (Honolulu)	Democratic	Jan 3, 2013 – present	Elected in 2012.	10	113th	10	Appointed to continue Inouye's term. Elected in 2014 to finish Inouye's term.	Dec 26, 2012 – present	Democratic	Brian Schatz (Honolulu)	3
4	Mazie Hirono (Honolulu)	Democratic	Jan 3, 2013 – present	Elected in 2012.	10	114th	10	Appointed to continue Inouye's term. Elected in 2014 to finish Inouye's term.	Dec 26, 2012 – present	Democratic	Brian Schatz (Honolulu)	3
4	Mazie Hirono (Honolulu)	Democratic	Jan 3, 2013 – present	Elected in 2012.	10	115th	11	Re-elected in 2016.	Dec 26, 2012 – present	Democratic	Brian Schatz (Honolulu)	3
4	Mazie Hirono (Honolulu)	Democratic	Jan 3, 2013 – present	Re-elected in 2018.	11	116th	11	Re-elected in 2016.	Dec 26, 2012 – present	Democratic	Brian Schatz (Honolulu)	3
4	Mazie Hirono (Honolulu)	Democratic	Jan 3, 2013 – present	Re-elected in 2018.	11	117th	11	Re-elected in 2016.	Dec 26, 2012 – present	Democratic	Brian Schatz (Honolulu)	3
4	Mazie Hirono (Honolulu)	Democratic	Jan 3, 2013 – present	Re-elected in 2018.	11	118th	12	Re-elected in 2022.	Dec 26, 2012 – present	Democratic	Brian Schatz (Honolulu)	3
4	Mazie Hirono (Honolulu)	Democratic	Jan 3, 2013 – present	Re-elected in 2024.	12	119th	12	Re-elected in 2022.	Dec 26, 2012 – present	Democratic	Brian Schatz (Honolulu)	3
4	Mazie Hirono (Honolulu)	Democratic	Jan 3, 2013 – present	Re-elected in 2024.	12	120th	12	Re-elected in 2022.	Dec 26, 2012 – present	Democratic	Brian Schatz (Honolulu)	3
4	Mazie Hirono (Honolulu)	Democratic	Jan 3, 2013 – present	Re-elected in 2024.	12	121st	13	To be determined in the 2028 election.				
To be determined in the 2030 election.					13	122nd	13	To be determined in the 2028 election.				

== See also ==
- Elections in Hawaii
- Hawaii's congressional delegations
- List of United States representatives from Hawaii
