= 1962 United States Senate election in Hawaii =

- November 6, 1962
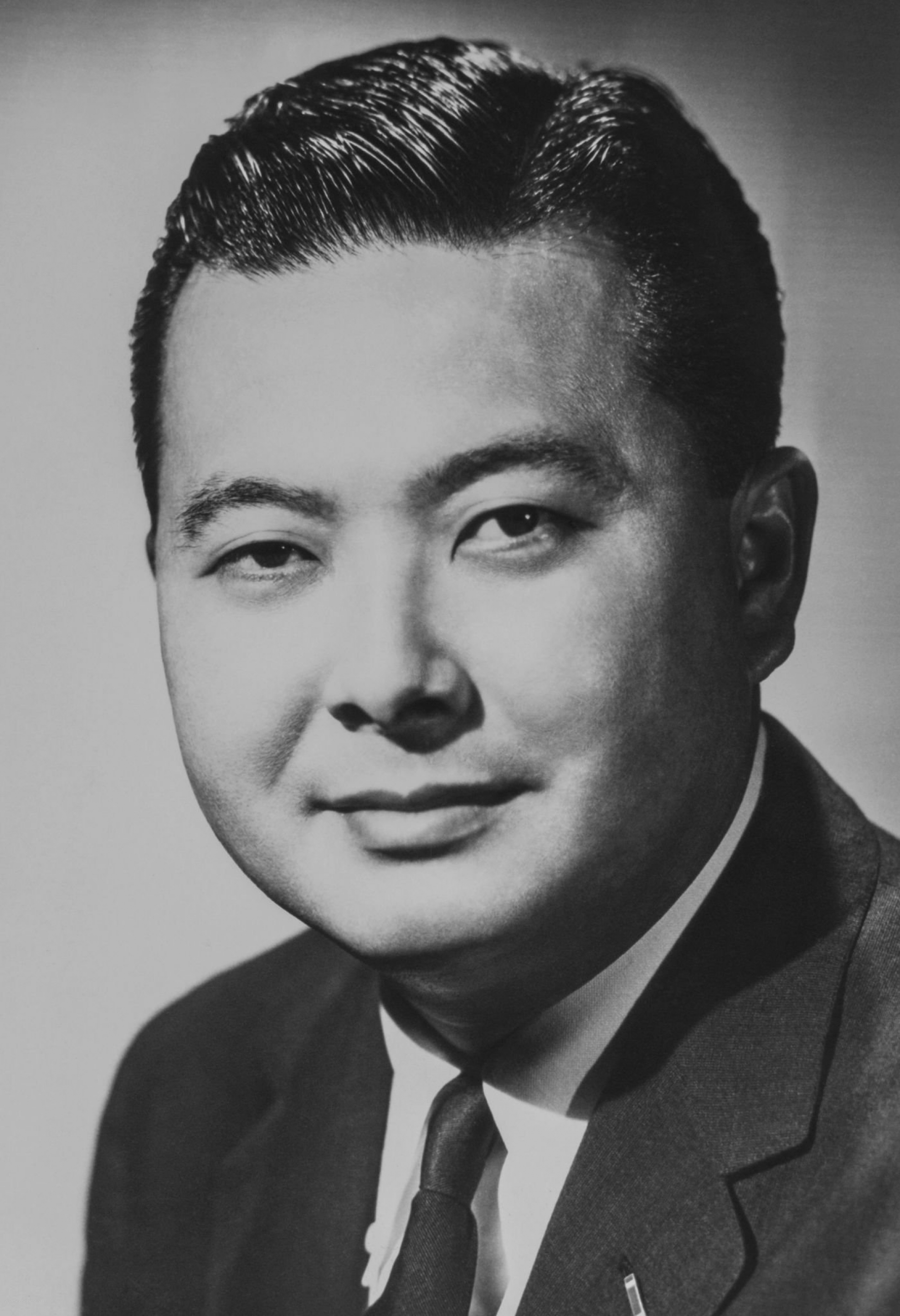

Nominee	Daniel Inouye	Ben Dillingham II
Party	Democratic	Republican
Popular vote	136,294	60,067
Percentage	69.41%	30.59%
- County results Inouye: 60–70% 70–80%
U.S. senator before election
Oren Long
Democratic
Elected U.S. Senator
Daniel Inouye
Democratic

The 1962 United States Senate election in Hawaii took place on November 6, 1962. Incumbent Democratic Senator Oren Long decided to retire rather than serving a full term in office, after an abbreviated three-year term. Democratic U.S. Representative Dan Inouye was elected to succeed Long, defeating Republican Ben Dillingham II, the heir to the massive Dillingham industrial fortune.

Inouye would continue to hold the seat with little trouble for nearly fifty years, until his death in 2012.

== Democratic primary ==
=== Candidates ===
- Daniel Inouye, at-large U.S. Representative
- Frank Troy

=== Results ===
1962 Democratic U.S. Senate primary
Party	Candidate	Votes	%
Democratic	Daniel Inouye	80,707	93.65%
Democratic	Frank Troy	5,476	6.35%
Total votes		126,961	100.00%

== General election ==
=== Results ===
1962 United States Senate election in Hawaii
Party	Candidate	Votes	%	±%
Democratic	Daniel Inouye	136,294	69.41%	▲18.33
Republican	Ben Dillingham II	60,067	30.59%	▼17.69
Total votes		196,361	100.00%	
Democratic hold		Swing		

== See also ==
- 1962 United States Senate elections
