= 1968 United States Senate election in Hawaii =

- November 5, 1968
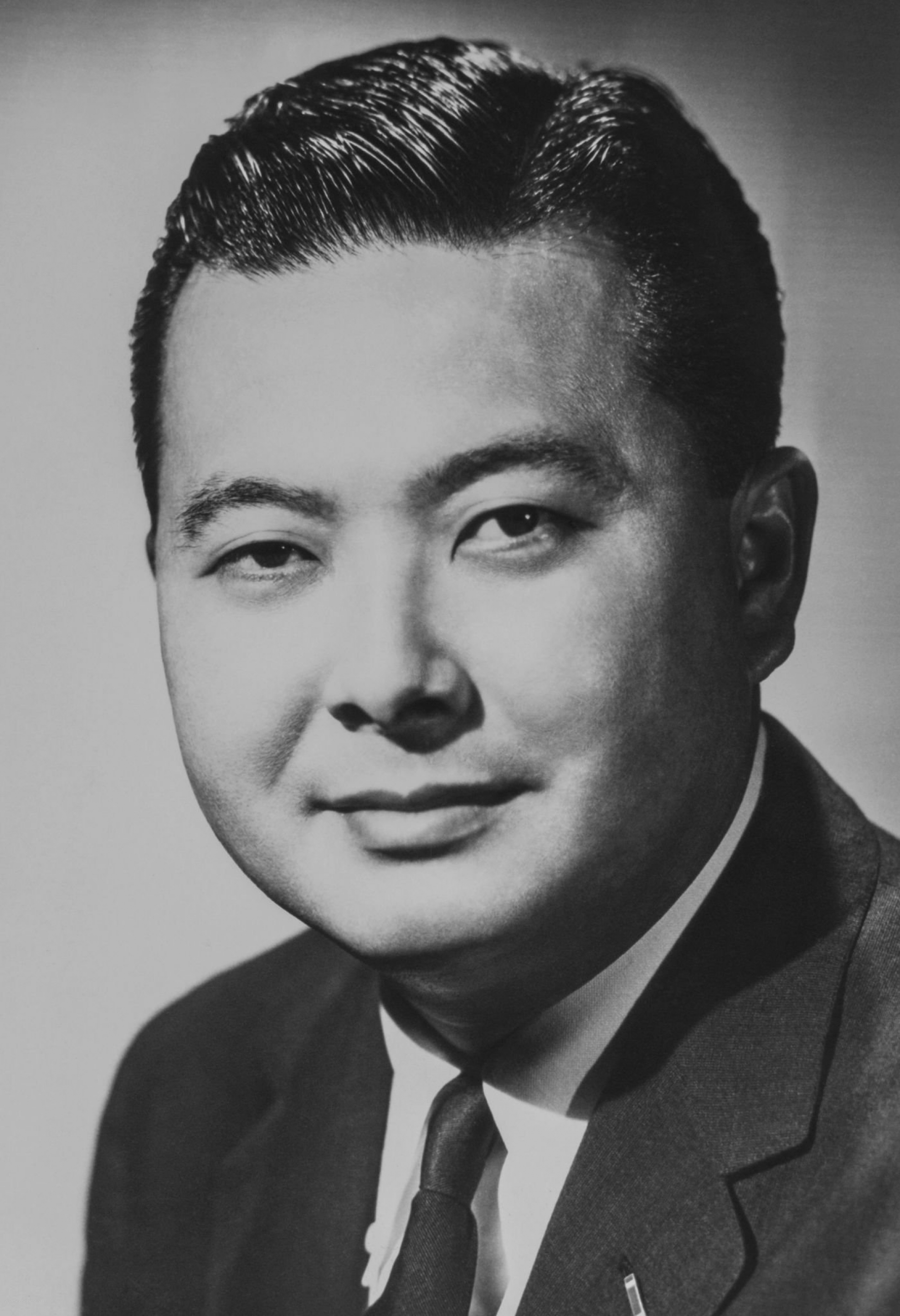

Nominee	Daniel Inouye	Wayne Thiessen
Party	Democratic	Republican
Popular vote	189,248	34,008
Percentage	83.40%	14.99%
- County results Inouye: 80–90%
U.S. senator before election
Daniel Inouye
Democratic
Elected U.S. Senator
Daniel Inouye
Democratic

The 1968 United States Senate election in Hawaii took place on November 5, 1968. Incumbent Democratic U.S. Senator Daniel Inouye was re-elected to a second term in office, easily defeating Republican nominee Wayne Thiessen.

== Democratic primary ==
=== Candidates ===
- Daniel Inouye, incumbent Senator
- William Lampard
- Joseph Petrowski, candidate for Senate in 1962 and U.S. Representative in 1964

=== Results ===
1968 Democratic U.S. Senate primary
Party	Candidate	Votes	%
Democratic	Daniel Inouye (inc.)	111,135	87.54%
Democratic	William Lampard	14,357	11.31%
Democratic	Joseph Petrowski	1,469	1.16%
Total votes		126,961	100.00%

== General election ==
=== Results ===
1968 United States Senate election in Hawaii
Party	Candidate	Votes	%	±%
Democratic	Daniel Inouye (inc.)	189,248	83.40%	▲13.99
Republican	Wayne C. Thiessen	34,008	14.99%	▼15.60
Peace and Freedom	Oliver M. Lee	3,671	1.62%	N/A
Total votes		235,686	100.00%	
Democratic hold		Swing		

== See also ==
- 1968 United States Senate elections
