= 2024 United States House of Representatives elections in Hawaii =

- November 5, 2024

Both Hawaii seats to the United States House of Representatives
	Majority party	Minority party
Party	Democratic	Republican
Last election	2	0
Seats won	2	0
Seat change	Steady	Steady
Popular vote	330,488	139,844
Percentage	69.03%	29.21%
Swing	▲1.24%	▼1.72%

Democratic
60–70%
70–80%

The 2024 United States House of Representatives elections in Hawaii were held on November 5, 2024, to elect the two U.S. representatives from the State of Hawaii, one from each of the state's two congressional districts. The elections coincided with the 2024 U.S. presidential election, as well as other elections to the House of Representatives, elections to the United States Senate, and various state and local elections. The primary elections were held on August 10, 2024.

== Overview ==
=== Statewide ===
Party	Candi- dates	Votes		Seats		
Party	Candi- dates	No.	%	No.	+/–	%
Democratic Party	2	330,488	69.03%	2	Steady	100%
Republican Party	2	139,844	29.21%	0	Steady	0%
Libertarian Party	1	4,497	0.94%	0	Steady	0%
Independent	1	3,937	0.82%	0	Steady	0%
Total	6	478,766	100%	2	Steady	100%

Popular vote
Democratic	69.03%
Republican	29.21%
Other	1.76%

House seats
Democratic	100.0%

=== District ===
District	Democratic		Republican		Others		Total		Result
District	Votes	%	Votes	%	Votes	%	Votes	%	Result
District 1	164,237	71.84%	64,373	28.16%	0	0.00%	228,610	100.0%	Democratic hold
District 2	166,251	66.46%	75,471	30.17%	8,434	3.37%	250,156	100.0%	Democratic hold
Total	330,488	69.03%	139,844	29.21%	8,434	1.76%	478,766	100.0%	

== District 1 ==
2024 Hawaii's 1st congressional district election
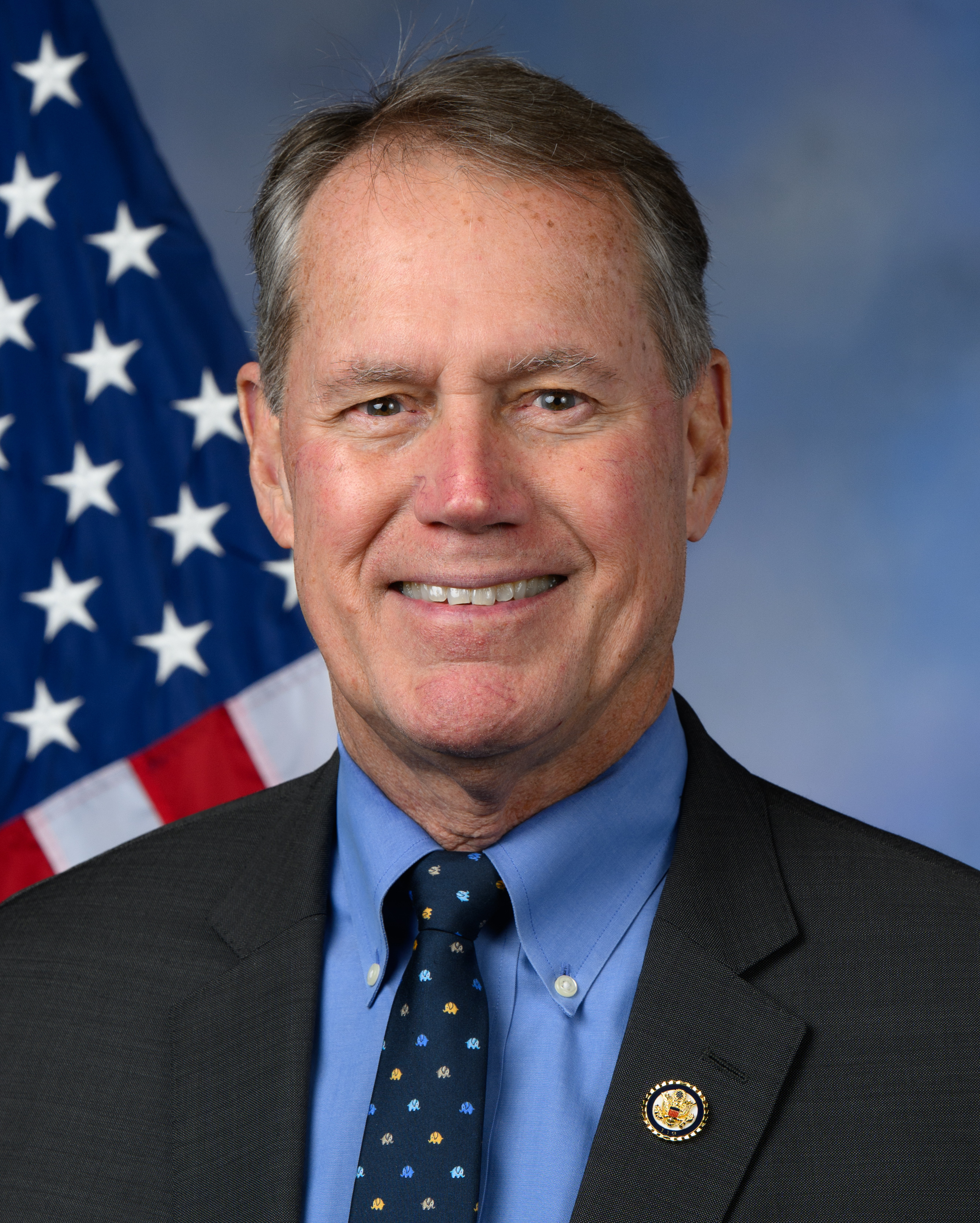

Nominee	Ed Case	Patrick Largey
Party	Democratic	Republican
Popular vote	164,237	64,373
Percentage	71.8%	28.2%
- Precinct results Case: 50–60% 60–70% 70–80% 80–90% No votes
U.S. Representative before election
Ed Case
Democratic
Elected U.S. Representative
Ed Case
Democratic

The 1st district is located entirely on the island of Oahu, centering on Honolulu and the towns of Aiea, Mililani, Pearl City, Waipahu, and Waimalu. The incumbent was Democrat Ed Case, who was re-elected with 73.7% of the vote in 2022.

=== Democratic primary ===
==== Candidates ====
===== Nominee =====
- Ed Case, incumbent U.S. representative

===== Eliminated in primary =====
- Cecil Hale, online clothing seller

==== Endorsements ====
Ed Case

Organizations

- AIPAC
- U.S. Chamber of Commerce

==== Fundraising ====
Campaign finance reports as of March 31, 2024
Candidate	Raised	Spent	Cash on hand
Ed Case (D)	$423,257	$169,090	$761,697
Source: Federal Election Commission

==== Results ====
Democratic primary results
Party	Candidate	Votes	%
Democratic	Ed Case (incumbent)	84,114	92.0
Democratic	Cecil Hale	7,308	8.0
Total votes		91,422	100.0

=== Republican primary ===
==== Candidates ====
===== Nominee =====
- Patrick Largey, maintenance professional and candidate for this district in 2022

==== Results ====
Republican primary results
Party	Candidate	Votes	%
Republican	Patrick Largey	17,368	100.0
Total votes		17,368	100.0

=== Nonpartisan primary ===
==== Candidates ====
===== Nominee =====
- Calvin Griffin, radio host and perennial candidate

==== Results ====
Nonpartisan primary results
Party	Candidate	Votes	%
Independent	Calvin Griffin	409	100.0
Total votes		409	100.0

=== General election ===
==== Predictions ====
Source	Ranking	As of
The Cook Political Report	Safe D	December 30, 2023
Inside Elections	Safe D	October 23, 2023
Sabato's Crystal Ball	Safe D	January 10, 2024
Decision Desk HQ	Solid D	June 1, 2024

==== Results ====
2024 Hawaii's 1st congressional district election
Party	Candidate	Votes	%
Democratic	Ed Case (incumbent)	164,237	71.8
Republican	Patrick Largey	64,373	28.2
Total votes		228,610	100.0
Democratic hold			

==== By county ====
County	Ed Case Democratic		Patrick Largey Republican		Margin		Total
County	#	%	#	%	#	%	Total
Honolulu (part)	164,237	71.8%	64,373	28.2%	99,864	43.6%	228,610

== District 2 ==
2024 Hawaii's 2nd congressional district election
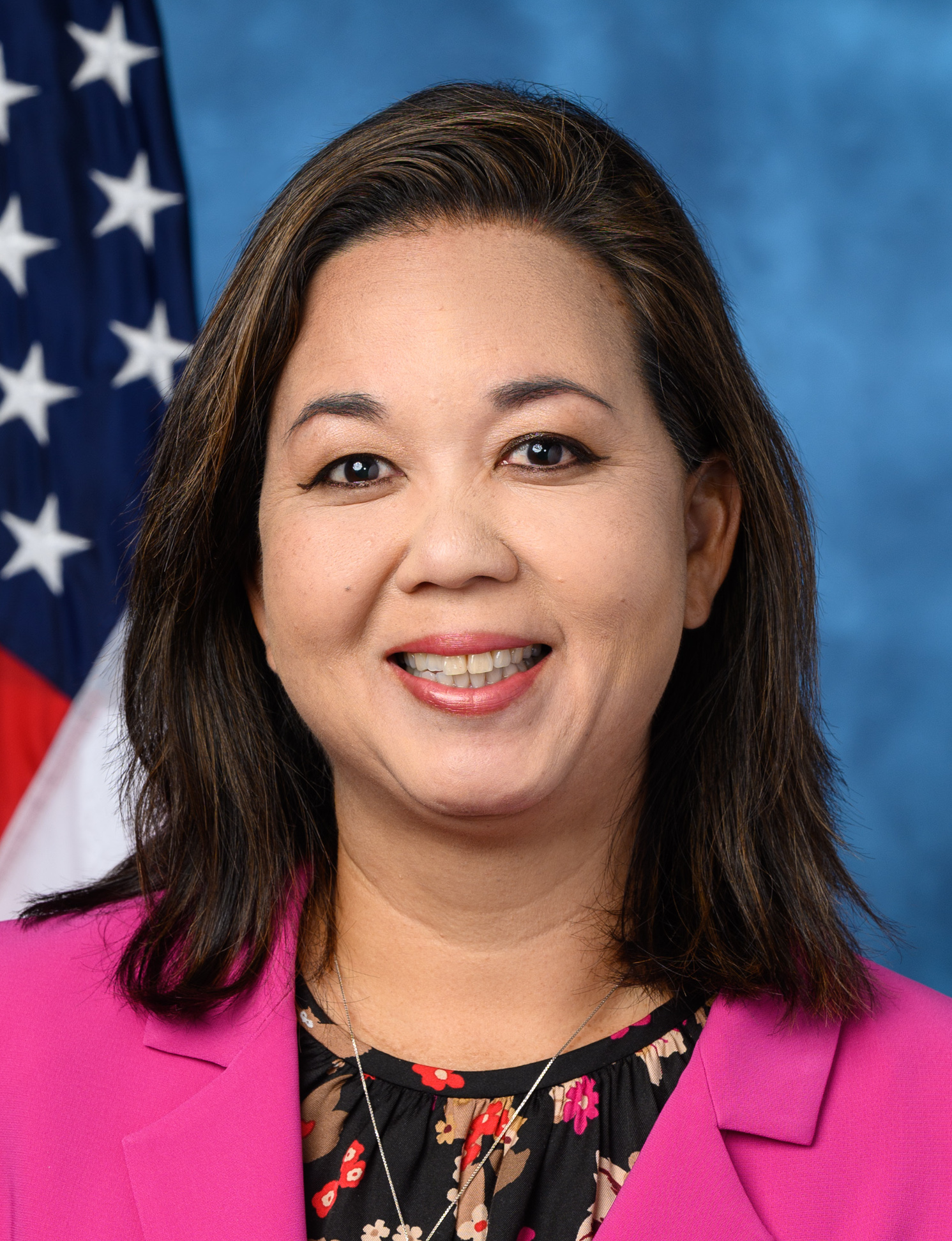

Nominee	Jill Tokuda	Steve Bond
Party	Democratic	Republican
Popular vote	166,251	75,471
Percentage	66.5%	30.2%
- Tokuda: 40–50% 50–60% 60–70% 70–80% Bond: 50–60% 60–70% 80–90% Tie: 40–50% No votes
U.S. Representative before election
Jill Tokuda
Democratic
Elected U.S. Representative
Jill Tokuda
Democratic

The 2nd district takes in rural and suburban Oahu, including Waimanalo Beach, Kailua, Kaneohe, Kahuku, Makaha, Nanakuli, as well as encompassing all the other islands of Hawaii, taking in the counties of Hawaii, Kalawao, Kauaʻi, and Maui. The incumbent was Democrat Jill Tokuda, who was elected with 62.2% of the vote in 2022.

=== Democratic primary ===
==== Candidates ====
===== Nominee =====
- Jill Tokuda, incumbent U.S. representative

==== Endorsements ====
Jill Tokuda

Organizations

- Humane Society Legislative Fund
- National Organization for Women PAC
- National Women's Political Caucus
- Vote Mama

Labor unions

- Association of Flight Attendants
- National Education Association

==== Fundraising ====
Campaign finance reports as of March 31, 2024
Candidate	Raised	Spent	Cash on hand
Jill Tokuda (D)	$552,555	$372,489	$380,802
Source: Federal Election Commission

==== Results ====
Democratic primary results
Party	Candidate	Votes	%
Democratic	Jill Tokuda (incumbent)	84,978	100.0
Total votes		84,978	100.0

=== Republican primary ===
==== Candidates ====
===== Nominee =====
- Steve Bond, realtor, candidate for this district in 2020, and candidate for U.S. Senate in 2022

==== Results ====
Republican primary results
Party	Candidate	Votes	%
Republican	Steve Bond	19,627	100.0
Total votes		19,627	100.0

=== Libertarian primary ===
==== Candidates ====
===== Nominee =====
- Aaron Toman, farmer

==== Results ====
Libertarian primary results
Party	Candidate	Votes	%
Libertarian	Aaron Toman	361	100.0
Total votes		361	100.0

=== Nonpartisan primary ===
==== Candidates ====
===== Nominee =====
- Randall Meyer

==== Results ====
Nonpartisan primary results
Party	Candidate	Votes	%
Independent	Randall Meyer	580	100.0
Total votes		580	100.0

=== General election ===
==== Predictions ====
Source	Ranking	As of
The Cook Political Report	Safe D	December 30, 2023
Inside Elections	Safe D	October 23, 2023
Sabato's Crystal Ball	Safe D	January 10, 2024
Decision Desk HQ	Solid D	June 1, 2024

==== Results ====
2024 Hawaii's 2nd congressional district election
Party	Candidate	Votes	%
Democratic	Jill Tokuda (incumbent)	166,251	66.5
Republican	Steve Bond	75,471	30.2
Libertarian	Aaron Toman	4,497	1.8
Independent	Randall Meyer	3,937	1.6
Total votes		250,156	100.0
Democratic hold			

==== By county ====
County	Jill Tokuda Democratic		Steve Bond Republican		Various candidates Other parties		Margin		Total
County	#	%	#	%	#	%	#	%	Total
Hawaii	53,501	69.0%	21,346	27.5%	1,814	3.5%	32,155	41.5%	77,558
Honolulu (part)	54,455	62.4%	29,951	34.3%	2,816	3.3%	24,504	28.1%	87,222
Kauaʻi	18,353	67.9%	7,904	29.2%	788	2.9%	10,449	38.7%	27,045
Maui	39,942	68.5%	16,270	27.9%	2,119	3.7%	23,672	40.6%	58,331
Totals	166,251	66.5%	75,471	30.2%	8,434	3.4%	90,780	35.3%	250,156
