= 1974 United States Senate election in Hawaii =

- November 5, 1974
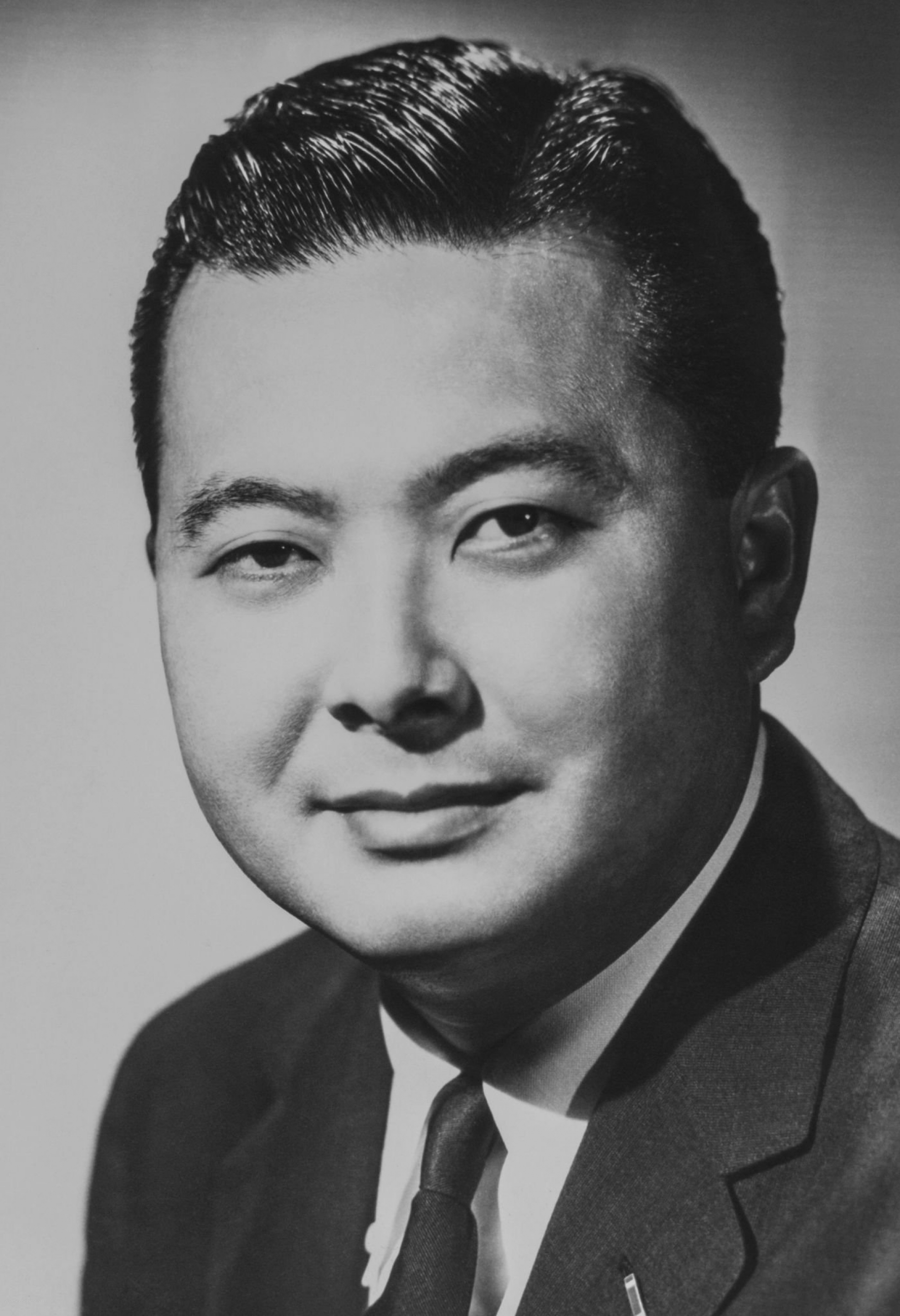

Nominee	Daniel Inouye	James Kimmel
Party	Democratic	People's
Popular vote	207,454	42,767
Percentage	82.91%	17.09%
- County results Inouye: 80–90%
U.S. senator before election
Daniel Inouye
Democratic
Elected U.S. Senator
Daniel Inouye
Democratic

The 1974 United States Senate election in Hawaii took place on November 5, 1974. Incumbent Democratic U.S. Senator Daniel Inouye was re-elected to a third term in office, easily defeating People's Party nominee James Kimmel.

== People's Party primary ==
=== Candidates ===
- Floyd Bernier-Nachtwey
- James D. Kimmel

=== Results ===
People's primary results
Party	Candidate	Votes	%
People's	James D. Kimmel	61	64.89%
People's	Floyd Bernier-Nachtwey	33	35.11%
Total votes		94	100.00%

== General election ==
=== Results ===
1974 United States Senate election in Hawaii
Party	Candidate	Votes	%	±%
Democratic	Daniel Inouye (incumbent)	207,454	82.91%	▼0.49
People's Party (United States, 1971)	James D. Kimmel	42,767	17.09%	N/A
Total votes		250,221	100.00%	
Democratic hold		Swing		

== See also ==
- 1974 United States Senate elections
