= 2022 United States Senate election in Hawaii =

- November 8, 2022
- Turnout: 48.4%
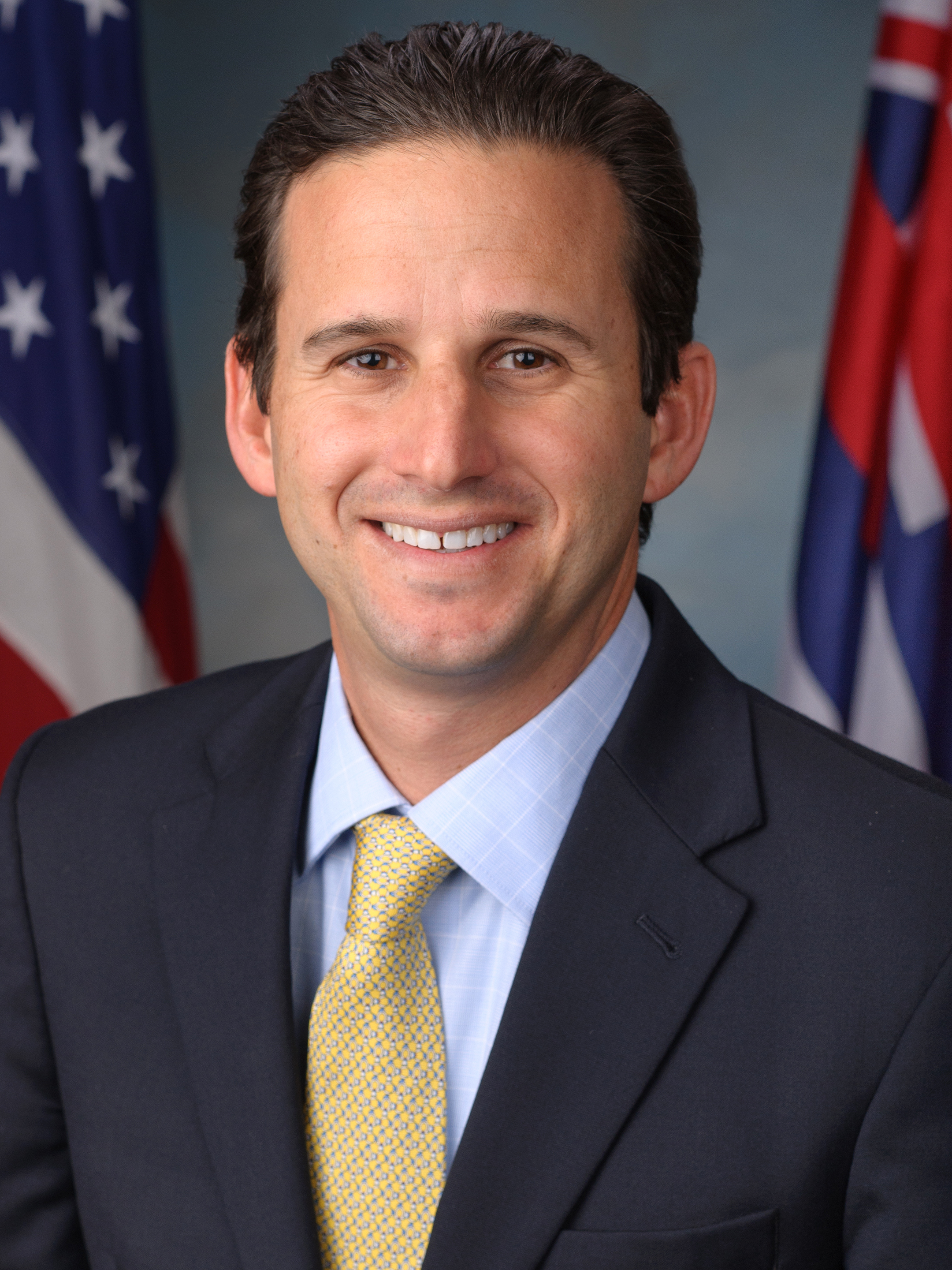

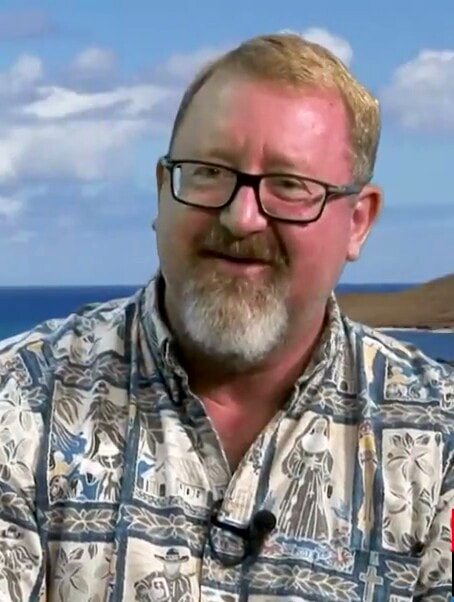
Nominee	Brian Schatz	Bob McDermott
Party	Democratic	Republican
Popular vote	290,894	106,358
Percentage	71.21%	26.04%
- Schatz: 40–50% 50–60% 60–70% 70–80% 80–90% >90% McDermott: 50–60% 60–70% 70–80% No votes
U.S. senator before election
Brian Schatz
Democratic
Elected U.S. senator
Brian Schatz
Democratic

The 2022 United States Senate election in Hawaii was held on November 8, 2022, to elect a member of the United States Senate to represent the state of Hawaii. The primary took place on August 13.

Incumbent Democrat Brian Schatz won re-election to a second full term in a landslide, winning 71.2% of the vote to Republican state representative Bob McDermott's 26%. The results were a slightly lower margin of victory for Schatz compared to his previous victory in 2016.

Schatz was first appointed to the Senate in 2012 after the death of incumbent Daniel Inouye. He won a 2014 special election to finish Inouye's term, won his first full term in 2016, and ran for reelection for his second full term in 2022.

== Democratic primary ==
=== Candidates ===
==== Nominee ====
- Brian Schatz, incumbent U.S. Senator

==== Eliminated in primary ====
- Steve Tataii, teacher and perennial candidate

=== Endorsements ===
Brian Schatz

Organizations

- Feminist Majority PAC
- Giffords
- Jewish Democratic Council of America
- League of Conservation Voters
- Natural Resources Defense Council
- Population Connection Action Fund
- Sierra Club

Results by county: Schatz: 90–100%

=== Results ===
Democratic primary results
Party	Candidate	Votes	%
Democratic	Brian Schatz (incumbent)	228,595	93.56%
Democratic	Steve Tataii	15,725	6.44%
Total votes		244,320	100.0%

== Republican primary ==
=== Candidates ===
==== Nominee ====
- Bob McDermott, state representative, nominee for Hawaii's 2nd congressional district in 2002, and candidate for Governor of Hawaii in 2018

==== Eliminated in primary ====
- Steven Bond, realtor, farmer and candidate for Hawaii's 2nd congressional district in 2020
- Wallyn Kanoelani Christian, realtor
- Timothy Dalhouse, retired Army veteran
- Asia Lavonne, pastor

=== Results ===
Results by county: McDermott: 40–50%; Dalhouse: 20–30%; 30–40%

Republican primary results
Party	Candidate	Votes	%
Republican	Bob McDermott	25,686	39.56%
Republican	Timothy Dalhouse	17,158	26.42%
Republican	Wallyn Kanoelani Christian	9,497	14.62%
Republican	Steven Bond	6,407	9.87%
Republican	Asia Lavonne	6,187	9.53%
Total votes		64,935	100.0%

== Libertarian primary ==
=== Candidates ===
==== Nominee ====
- Feena Bonoan, U.S. Navy veteran, filmmaker, and candidate for Hawaii Senate in 2020

===== Disqualified =====
- Michael Kokoski, nominee for this seat in 2014

=== Results ===
Libertarian primary results
Party	Candidate	Votes	%
Libertarian	Feena Bonoan	515	100.0
Total votes		515	100.0%

== Green primary ==
=== Candidates ===
==== Nominee ====
- Emma Jane Pohlman, attorney

=== Results ===
Green primary results
Party	Candidate	Votes	%
Green	Emma Jane Pohlman	1,245	100.0
Total votes		1,245	100.0%

== Aloha ʻĀina primary ==
=== Candidates ===
==== Nominee ====
- Dan Decker, former chair of the Aloha ʻĀina

=== Results ===
Aloha ʻĀina primary results
Party	Candidate	Votes	%
Aloha ʻĀina	Dan Decker	987	100.0
Total votes		987	100.0%

== Nonpartisan primary ==
=== Candidates ===
==== Disqualified ====
- Dennis Miller
- Steve Tataii

== General election ==
=== Predictions ===
Source	Ranking	As of
The Cook Political Report	Solid D	March 4, 2022
Inside Elections	Solid D	April 1, 2022
Sabato's Crystal Ball	Safe D	March 1, 2022
Politico	Solid D	April 1, 2022
RCP	Safe D	February 24, 2022
Fox News	Solid D	May 12, 2022
DDHQ	Solid D	July 20, 2022
538	Solid D	June 30, 2022
The Economist	Safe D	September 7, 2022

=== Post-primary endorsements ===
Brian Schatz (D)

Newspapers

- Honolulu Star-Advertiser

Organizations

- Brady Campaign
- Hawaii AFL–CIO
- Hawaii Fire Fighters Association
- Hawaii Government Employees Association
- Human Rights Campaign
- Humane Society Legislative Fund
- International Federation of Professional and Technical Engineers
- International Longshore and Warehouse Union
- J Street PAC
- National Committee to Preserve Social Security and Medicare
- National Education Association
- Newtown Action Alliance
- United Association
- United Auto Workers
Bob McDermott (R)

Individuals

- Timothy Dalhouse, retired Army veteran and candidate for the U.S. Senate in 2022

=== Results ===
2022 United States Senate election in Hawaii
Party	Candidate	Votes	%	±%
Democratic	Brian Schatz (incumbent)	290,894	71.21%	–2.40%
Republican	Bob McDermott	106,358	26.04%	+3.80%
Libertarian	Feena Bonoan	4,915	1.20%	–0.43%
Green	Emma Jane Pohlman	4,142	1.01%	N/A
Aloha ʻĀina	Dan Decker	2,208	0.54%	N/A
Total votes		408,517	100.0%	
Democratic hold				

==== By county ====
By county

County	Brian Schatz Democratic		Bob McDermott Republican		Feena Bonoan Libertarian		Emma Pohlman Green		Dan Decker Aloha ʻĀina		Margin		Total votes
County	#	%	#	%	#	%	#	%	#	%	#	%	Total votes
Hawaii	46,096	72.90	15,156	23.97	798	1.26	792	1.25	392	0.62	30,940	48.93	63,234
Honolulu	190,178	70.18	74,265	27.40	2,991	1.10	2,334	0.86	1,223	0.45	115,913	42.77	270,991
Kauaʻi	16,891	72.50	5,658	24.28	306	1.31	306	1.31	138	0.59	11,233	48.21	23,299
Maui	37,565	74.04	11,202	22.08	813	1.60	703	1.39	450	0.89	26,363	51.96	50,733
Totals	289,585	71.25	105,704	26.01	4,870	1.20	4,102	1.01	2,189	0.54	183,881	45.24	406,450

==== By congressional district ====
Schatz won both congressional districts.

District	Schatz	McDermott	Representative
1st	72%	26%	Ed Case
2nd	71%	26%	Kai Kahele (117th Congress)
2nd	71%	26%	Jill Tokuda (118th Congress)

== See also ==
- 2022 United States Senate elections
