= List of minority governors and lieutenant governors in the United States =

This is a list of minority governors and lieutenant state governors in the United States. In the United States, an ethnic minority is anyone who has at least one parent who is not of non-Hispanic white descent (such as African Americans, Asian Americans, Pacific Islands Americans, Hispanic and Latino Americans, or Native Americans). Ethnic minorities currently constitute around 38.9% of the total population. United States governors are included but lieutenant governor-equivalent roles (positions next in the line of succession absent an office of the lieutenant governor, such as secretary of state or senate president) are not currently included.

== List of ethnic-minority governors ==
Denotes incumbent governor
- Italics denotes acting governor

Name	Ethnicity	Party	State	Start	End	Notes
Oscar Dunn (Note: Elevated from lieutenant governor. Dunn served as acting governor twice in 1871 due to an injury suffered by Gov. Henry C. Warmoth that required him to recuperate out of state.) (1822–1871)	African American	Republican	Louisiana	May 5, 1871	July 18, 1871	Term ended
P. B. S. Pinchback (Note: Elevated from lieutenant governor.) (1837–1921)	African American	Republican	Louisiana	December 9, 1872	January 13, 1873	Term ended
Romualdo Pacheco (Note: Pacheco was elevated from lieutenant governor. Pacheco later served as U.S. Representative from California's 4th congressional district.) (1831–1899)	Californio	Republican	California	February 27, 1875	December 9, 1875	Term ended
C. C. Antoine (Note: Elevated from lieutenant governor. Antoine served as acting governor 1876 due to Gov. William Pitt Kellogg being out of state.) (1836–1921)	African American	Republican	Louisiana	June 9, 1876	July 7, 1876	Term ended
Ezequiel Cabeza De Baca (Note: Cabeza De Baca previously served as lieutenant governor.) (1864–1917)	Hispano	Democratic	New Mexico	January 3, 1917	February 18, 1917	Died in office
Octaviano Larrazolo (Note: Larrazolo previously served as U.S. Senator from New Mexico.) (1859–1930)	Mexican American	Republican	New Mexico	January 1, 1919	January 1, 1921	Lost renomination
Johnston Murray (1902–1974)	Native American (Chickasaw)	Democratic	Oklahoma	January 8, 1951	January 10, 1955	Term limited
George Ariyoshi (Note: Ariyoshi had previously been elevated to acting governor from lieutenant governor until elected in his own right.) (1926–2026)	Japanese American	Democratic	Hawaii	October 17, 1973	December 2, 1986	Term limited
Jerry Apodaca (1934–2023)	Mexican American	Democratic	New Mexico	January 1, 1975	January 1, 1979	Term limited
Raúl Castro (Note: Resigned to become United States Ambassador to Argentina) (1916–2015)	Mexican American	Democratic	Arizona	January 6, 1975	October 20, 1977	Resigned to become Ambassador of the United States to Argentina
Toney Anaya (born 1941)	Mexican American	Democratic	New Mexico	January 1, 1983	January 1, 1987	Term limited
John Sununu (Note: Sununu later served as White House Chief of Staff) (born 1939)	Salvadoran American	Republican	New Hampshire	January 6, 1983	January 4, 1989	Retired
John Waihee (Note: Waihee previously served as lieutenant governor.) (born 1946)	Native Hawaiian	Democratic	Hawaii	December 2, 1986	December 2, 1994	Term limited
Bob Martinez (born 1934)	Spanish American	Republican	Florida	January 6, 1987	January 8, 1991	Lost reelection
Douglas Wilder (Note: Wilder previously served as lieutenant governor.) (born 1931)	African American	Democratic	Virginia	January 13, 1990	January 15, 1994	Term limited
Ben Cayetano (born 1939)	Filipino American	Democratic	Hawaii	December 2, 1994	December 2, 2002	Term limited
Gary Locke (Note: Locke later served as United States Secretary of Commerce and United States Ambassador to China.) (born 1950)	Chinese American	Democratic	Washington	January 15, 1997	January 12, 2005	Retired
Bill Richardson (Note: Richardson previously served as United States Secretary of Energy, United States Ambassador to the United Nations and U.S. Representative from New Mexico's 3rd congressional district.) (1947–2023)	Mexican American	Democratic	New Mexico	January 1, 2003	January 1, 2011	Term limited
Deval Patrick (born 1956)	African American	Democratic	Massachusetts	January 4, 2007	January 8, 2015	Retired
Bobby Jindal (Note: Jindal previously served as U.S. Representative from Louisiana's 1st congressional district.) (born 1971)	Indian American	Republican	Louisiana	January 14, 2008	January 11, 2016	Term limited
David Paterson (Note: Elevated to office from lieutenant governor.) (born 1954)	African American	Democratic	New York	March 17, 2008	December 31, 2010	Retired
Susana Martinez (born 1959)	Mexican American	Republican	New Mexico	January 1, 2011	January 1, 2019	Term limited
Brian Sandoval (born 1963)	Mexican American	Republican	Nevada	January 3, 2011	January 7, 2019	Term limited
Nikki Haley (Note: Resigned to become United States Ambassador to the United Nations) (born 1972)	Indian American	Republican	South Carolina	January 12, 2011	January 24, 2017	Resigned to become Ambassador of the United States to the United Nations
David Ige (born 1957)	Okinawan American	Democratic	Hawaii	December 1, 2014	December 5, 2022	Term limited
Michelle Lujan Grisham (Note: Lujan Grisham previously served as U.S. Representative from New Mexico's 1st congressional district.) (born 1959)	Mexican American	Democratic	New Mexico	January 1, 2019	January 1, 2027	Term limited
Kevin Stitt (born 1972)	Native American (Cherokee)	Republican	Oklahoma	January 14, 2019	January 14, 2027	Term limited
Wes Moore (born 1978)	African American, Cuban American	Democratic	Maryland	January 18, 2023	present	
Deb Haaland (Note: Haaland previously served as United States Secretary of the Interior and U.S. Representative from New Mexico's 1st congressional district.) (born 1960)	Native American (Laguna Pueblo)	Democratic	New Mexico	January 1, 2027		Elect
Xavier Becerra (Note: Becerra previously served as United States Secretary of Health and Human Services and U.S. Representative from California.) (born 1958)	Mexican American	Democratic	California	January 4, 2027		Elect
David Crowley (born 1986)	African American	Democratic	Wisconsin	January 4, 2027		Elect
Aaron Ford (born 1972)	African American	Democratic	Nevada	January 4, 2027		Elect
Byron Donalds (Note: Donalds previously served as U.S. Representative from Florida's 19th congressional district.) (born 1978)	African American; Panamanian American	Republican	Florida	January 5, 2027		Elect
Keisha Lance Bottoms (Note: Bottoms preivously served as Senior Advisor to the President and Director of the Office of Public Engagement.) (born 1970)	African American	Democratic	Georgia	January 11, 2027		Elect
Gina Hinojosa (born 1973)	Mexican American	Democratic	Texas	January 19, 2027		Elect

=== Territorial governors ===
Several governors of U.S. territories have been ethnic minorities. Many of these officials were appointed before elections were instituted in these jurisdictions. In each of the five current U.S. territories, Hispanic or non-white ethnic groups make up large majorities: Puerto Rican Hispanic Americans in Puerto Rico, African Americans in the U.S. Virgin Islands, Chamorros in Guam and the Northern Mariana Islands, and Samoans in American Samoa. Elected governors and some appointed governors in these territories that have come from these majority ethnic groups are not listed here; for more details see List of governors of Puerto Rico, List of governors of the United States Virgin Islands, List of governors of Guam, List of governors of the Northern Mariana Islands, and List of governors of American Samoa.

Denotes incumbent governor
- Italics denotes acting governor

Name	Ethnicity	Party	Territory	Start	End	Notes
Miguel Otero (1859–1944)	Mexican American	Republican	New Mexico	July 14, 1897	January 22, 1906	Appointment ended
Frank Portusach (1864–1919)	Spanish American	Independent	Guam	June 22, 1898	December 12, 1898	Deposed (Note: A Spanish Filipino, José Sisto, served from December 12, 1898 – February 1, 1899 in the Spanish government's name, despite tacit acknowledgment by the Americans until the 1898 Treaty of Paris.)
William Coe (1857–1909)	Samoan	Independent	Guam	April 20, 1899	May 9, 1899	Appointment ended
Morris de Castro (Note: Elevated to acting governor from secretary until appointed in his own right) (1902–1966)	Panamanian American	Democratic	U.S. Virgin Islands	October 21, 1949	April 9, 1954	Resigned appointment
Samuel King (1886-1959)	Native Hawaiian	Republican	Hawaii	January 28, 1953	July 26, 1957	Resigned appointment
Juan Luis (Note: Elevated to governor from lieutenant governor. Later elected in his own right.) (1940–2011)	Puerto Rican	Independent Citizens Movement (1978–1979)	U.S. Virgin Islands	January 2, 1978	January 5, 1987	Term limited
Juan Luis (1940–2011)	Puerto Rican	Independent (1979–1987)	U.S. Virgin Islands	January 2, 1978	January 5, 1987	Term limited
Benigno Fitial (born 1945)	Carolinian	Covenant (2006–2011)	Northern Mariana Islands	January 9, 2006	February 20, 2013	Impeached and removed from office

== List of ethnic-minority lieutenant governors ==
Denotes incumbent lieutenant governor
- Italics denotes acting lieutenant governor

Image	Name	Minority ethnicity	Party	State	Term start	Term end	Notes
	Pablo de la Guerra (1819–1874)	Mexican American	Democratic	California	January 7, 1861	January 10, 1862	Retired
	Oscar Dunn (1826–1871)	African American	Republican	Louisiana	June 27, 1868	November 22, 1871	Died
	Alonzo Ransier (Note: Ransier later served as U.S. Representative from South Carolina's 2nd congressional district.) (1834–1882)	African American	Republican	South Carolina	December 3, 1870	December 7, 1872	Retired to run successfully for South Carolina's 2nd congressional district
	Alexander Kelso Davis (-1884)	African American	Republican	Mississippi	November 30, 1871	March 29, 1876	Resigned
	P. B. S. Pinchback (1837–1921)	African American	Republican	Louisiana	December 6, 1871	December 9, 1872	Elevated to governor
	Romualdo Pacheco (1831–1899)	Mexican American	Republican	California	December 8, 1871	February 27, 1875	Elevated to governor
	Richard Howell Gleaves (1819–1907)	African American	Republican	South Carolina	December 7, 1872	December 14, 1876	Lost reelection
	Caesar Antoine (1836–1921)	African American	Republican	Louisiana	May 22, 1873	April 24, 1877	Lost reelection
	Albert Estopinal (Note: Estopinal later served as U.S. Representative from Louisiana's 1st congressional district.) (1845–1919)	Spanish American	Democratic	Louisiana	May 8, 1900	May 10, 1904	Retired
	Ezequiel Cabeza De Baca (1864–1917)	Mexican American	Democratic	New Mexico	January 6, 1912	January 1, 1917	Retired to run successfully for governor
	José Baca (1876–1924)	Mexican American	Democratic	New Mexico	January 1, 1923	May 17, 1924	Died
	Louis Cabeza de Baca (1894–1969)	Mexican American	Democratic	New Mexico	January 1, 1935	January 1, 1937	Retired
	Ceferino Quintana (1894–1977)	Mexican American	Democratic	New Mexico	January 1, 1941	January 1, 1943	Retired
	Joseph Montoya (Note: Montoya later served as U.S. Representative from New Mexico's at-large congressional district and U.S. Senator from New Mexico.) (1915–1978)	Mexican American	Democratic	New Mexico	January 1, 1947	January 1, 1951	Lost reelection
	Joseph Montoya (1915–1978)	Mexican American	Democratic	New Mexico	January 1, 1955	April 9, 1957	Retired to run successfully for New Mexico's at-large congressional district
	Tibo J. Chávez (1912–1991)	Mexican American	Democratic	New Mexico	January 1, 1951	January 1, 1955	Lost reelection
	James Kealoha (1908–1983)	Native Hawaiian, Chinese American	Republican	Hawaii	August 21, 1959	December 2, 1962	Retired to run unsuccessfully for the Republican nomination for governor
	William S. Richardson (1919–2010)	Native Hawaiian, Chinese American	Democratic	Hawaii	December 2, 1962	April 13, 1966	Resigned to become Chief Justice of the Hawaii Supreme Court
	Andrew T. F. Ing (1919–1999)	Chinese American	Democratic	Hawaii	April 13, 1966	December 2, 1966	Returned to previous post as Director of Finance
	Thomas Gill (Note: Gill previously served as U.S. Representative from Hawaii's at-large congressional district.) (1922–2009)	Cuban American	Democratic	Hawaii	December 2, 1966	December 2, 1970	Retired to run unsuccessfully for the Democratic nomination for governor
	George Ariyoshi (1926–2026)	Japanese American	Democratic	Hawaii	December 2, 1970	December 2, 1974	Retired to run successfully for governor
	Roberto Mondragón (born 1940)	Mexican American	Democratic	New Mexico	January 1, 1971	January 1, 1975	Retired
	Roberto Mondragón (born 1940)	Mexican American	Democratic	New Mexico	January 1, 1979	January 1, 1983	Retired
	Nelson Doi (1922–2015)	Japanese American	Democratic	Hawaii	December 2, 1974	December 2, 1978	Retired to run unsuccessfully for the Democratic nomination for Mayor of Honolulu
	Mervyn Dymally (Note: Dymally later served as U.S. Representative from California's 31st congressional district.) (1926–2012)	African American, Indian American	Democratic	California	January 6, 1975	January 8, 1979	Lost reelection
	George L. Brown (1926–2006)	African American	Democratic	Colorado	January 14, 1975	January 10, 1979	Retired
	Jean King (1925–2013)	Japanese American	Democratic	Hawaii	December 2, 1978	December 2, 1982	Retired to run unsuccessfully for the Democratic nomination for governor
	Mike Curb (born 1944)	Mexican American	Republican	California	January 8, 1979	January 3, 1983	Retired to run unsuccessfully for the Republican nomination for governor
	John D. Waiheʻe III (born 1946)	Native Hawaiian	Democratic	Hawaii	December 2, 1982	December 2, 1986	Retired to run successfully for governor
	S. B. Woo (born 1937)	Chinese American	Democratic	Delaware	January 15, 1985	January 20, 1989	Retired to run unsuccessfully for U.S. Senator from Delaware
	Douglas Wilder (born 1931)	African American	Democratic	Virginia	January 18, 1986	January 12, 1990	Retired to run successfully for governor
	Ben Cayetano (born 1939)	Filipino American	Democratic	Hawaii	December 2, 1986	December 2, 1994	Retired to run successfully for governor
	Casey Luna (born 1931)	Mexican American	Democratic	New Mexico	January 1, 1991	January 1, 1995	Retired to run unsuccessfully for the Democratic nomination for governor
	Mazie Hirono (Note: Hirono later served as U.S. Senator from Hawaii.) (born 1947)	Japanese American	Democratic	Hawaii	December 2, 1994	December 2, 2002	Retired to run unsuccessfully for governor
	Cruz Bustamante (born 1953)	Mexican American	Democratic	California	January 4, 1999	January 8, 2007	Retired to run unsuccessfully for California Insurance Commissioner
	Joe Rogers (1964–2013)	African American	Republican	Colorado	January 12, 1999	January 14, 2003	Retired
	Loren Leman (born 1950)	Native Alaskan (Alutiiq)	Republican	Alaska	December 2, 2002	December 4, 2006	Retired
	Duke Aiona (born 1955)	Native Hawaiian, Chinese American	Republican	Hawaii	December 4, 2002	December 6, 2010	Retired to run unsuccessfully for governor
	Jennette Bradley (born 1952)	African American	Republican	Ohio	January 13, 2003	January 5, 2005	Resigned to become Ohio Treasurer
	Michael Steele (Note: Steele later served as Chairman of the Republican National Committee.) (born 1958)	African American	Republican	Maryland	January 15, 2003	January 17, 2007	Retired to run unsuccessfully for U.S. Senator from Maryland
	David Paterson (born 1954)	African American	Democratic	New York	January 1, 2007	March 17, 2008	Elevated to governor
	Anthony Brown (born 1961)	African American	Democratic	Maryland	January 17, 2007	January 21, 2015	Retired to run unsuccessfully for governor
	Malcolm Smith (born 1956)	African American	Democratic	New York	January 7, 2009	June 8, 2009	Resigned and convicted.
	Pedro Espada Jr. (born 1953)	Puerto Rican	Democratic	New York	June 8, 2009	July 8, 2009	Resigned and convicted.
	Mona Pasquil (born 1962)	Filipino American	Democratic	California	November 4, 2009	April 27, 2010	Retired
	Abel Maldonado (born 1967)	Mexican American	Republican	California	April 27, 2010	January 10, 2011	Lost reelection
	John Sanchez (born 1963)	Mexican American	Republican	New Mexico	January 1, 2011	January 1, 2019	Term limited
	Jennifer Carroll (born 1959)	African American	Republican	Florida	January 4, 2011	March 12, 2013	Resigned
	Joseph Garcia (born 1957)	Mexican American	Democratic	Colorado	January 11, 2011	May 12, 2016	Resigned
	Shan Tsutsui (born 1971)	Japanese American	Democratic	Hawaii	December 27, 2012	January 31, 2018	Resigned
	Carlos Lopez-Cantera (born 1973)	Cuban American	Republican	Florida	February 3, 2014	January 8, 2019	Resigned
	Byron Mallott (1943–2020)	Native Alaskan (Tlingit)	Independent	Alaska	December 1, 2014	October 16, 2018	Resigned
	Evelyn Sanguinetti (born 1970)	Cuban American, Ecuadorian American	Republican	Illinois	January 12, 2015	January 14, 2019	Lost reelection
	Jenean Hampton (born 1958)	African American	Republican	Kentucky	December 8, 2015	December 10, 2019	Retired
	Boyd Rutherford (born 1957)	African American	Republican	Maryland	January 21, 2015	January 18, 2023	Term limited
	Cyrus Habib (born 1981)	Iranian American	Democratic	Washington	January 11, 2017	January 13, 2021	Retired to become a Jesuit Priest
	Justin Fairfax (1979–2026)	African American	Democratic	Virginia	January 13, 2018	January 15, 2022	Retired to run unsuccessfully for the Democratic nomination for governor
	Sheila Oliver (1952–2023)	African American	Democratic	New Jersey	January 16, 2018	August 1, 2023	Died
	Doug Chin (born 1971)	Chinese American	Democratic	Hawaii	February 2, 2018	December 3, 2018	Retired to run unsuccessfully for the Democratic nomination for Hawaii's 1st congressional district
	Valerie Davidson (born 1967)	Native Alaskan (Yup'ik)	Independent	Alaska	October 16, 2018	December 3, 2018	Retired
	Garlin Gilchrist (born 1982)	African American	Democratic	Michigan	January 1, 2019	present	
	Howie Morales (born 1973)	Mexican American	Democratic	New Mexico	January 1, 2019	present	
	Mandela Barnes (born 1986)	African American	Democratic	Wisconsin	January 7, 2019	January 3, 2023	Retired to run unsuccessfully for U.S. Senate.
	Peggy Flanagan (born 1979)	Native American (Chippewa)	Democratic (DFL)	Minnesota	January 7, 2019	present	
	Jeanette Nuñez (born 1972)	Cuban American	Republican	Florida	January 8, 2019	February 16, 2025	Resigned to serve as Interim President of Florida International University
	Juliana Stratton (born 1965)	African American	Democratic	Illinois	January 14, 2019	present	
	Mark Robinson (born 1968)	African American	Republican	North Carolina	January 3, 2021	January 1, 2025	Retired to run unsuccessfully for governor.
	Sabina Matos (born 1974)	African American, Dominican American	Democratic	Rhode Island	April 14, 2021	present	
	Andrea Stewart-Cousins (born 1950)	African American	Democratic	New York	August 24, 2021	September 9, 2021	New Lieutenant Governor appointed
	Andrea Stewart-Cousins (born 1950)	African American	Democratic	New York	April 12, 2022	May 25, 2022	New Lieutenant Governor appointed
	Brian Benjamin (born 1976)	African American	Democratic	New York	September 9, 2021	April 12, 2022	Resigned
	Lisa Cano Burkhead (born 1970)	Argentine American, Paraguayan American	Democratic	Nevada	December 16, 2021	January 3, 2023	Lost election to a full term
	Winsome Earle-Sears (born 1964)	African American, Jamaican American	Republican	Virginia	January 15, 2022	January 17, 2026	Retired to run unsuccessfully for governor
	Antonio Delgado (born 1977)	African American, Colombian American, Mexican American, Venezuelan American	Democratic	New York	May 25, 2022	present	
	Sylvia Luke (born 1967)	Korean American	Democratic	Hawaii	December 5, 2022	present	
	Austin Davis (born 1989)	African American	Democratic	Pennsylvania	January 17, 2023	present	
	Aruna Miller (born 1964)	Indian American	Democratic	Maryland	January 18, 2023	present	
	Tahesha Way (born 1971/1972)	African American	Democratic	New Jersey	September 8, 2023	January 20, 2026	Retired
	Ghazala Hashmi (born 1964)	Indian American	Democratic	Virginia	January 17, 2026	present	
	Dale Caldwell (born 1960)	African American	Democratic	New Jersey	January 20, 2026	September 25, 2026	Resigned
	Shirley Emehelu (born 1978/1979)	African American Nigerian American	Democratic	New Jersey	November 9, 2026	present	
	Derek Kawakami (born 1977)	Japanese American	Democratic	Hawaii	December 7, 2026		Elect
	Stephanie Garcia Richard (born 1974/1975)	Mexican American	Democratic	New Mexico	January 1, 2027		Elect
	Sandra Jauregui (born 1983)	Mexican American	Democratic	Nevada	January 4, 2027		Elect
	Fiona Ma (born 1966)	Chinese American	Democratic	California	January 4, 2027		Elect
	Bryan Avila (born 1984)	Cuban American	Republican	Florida	January 5, 2027		Elect
	Christian Mitchell (born 1986/1987)	African American	Democratic	Illinois	January 11, 2027		Elect
	Mike Reichenbach (born 1971)	African American	Republican	South Carolina	January 13, 2027		Elect
	T. W. Shannon (born 1978)	African American, Native American (Chickasaw)	Republican	Oklahoma	January 14, 2027		Elect
	KC Ohaebosim (born 1978)	African American, Nigerian American	Democratic	Kansas	January 11, 2027		Elect
	Adrienne Adams (born 1960)	African American	Democratic	New York	January 1, 2027		Elect

=== Territorial lieutenant governors ===
In each of the four current U.S. territories that have the office of lieutenant governor, non-white ethnic groups make up large majorities: African Americans in the U.S. Virgin Islands, Chamorros in Guam and the Northern Mariana Islands, and Samoans in American Samoa. Elected governors and some appointed governors in these territories that have come from these majority ethnic groups are not listed here; for more details see Lieutenant Governor of the United States Virgin Islands, Lieutenant Governor of Guam, Lieutenant Governor of the Northern Mariana Islands, and Lieutenant Governor of American Samoa.

Image	Name	Minority ethnicity	Party	Territory	Term start	Term end	Notes
	Morris de Castro (1902–1966)	Panamanian American	Democratic	U.S. Virgin Islands	1945	March 4, 1950	Elevated to Acting Governor from October 21, 1949; Later appointed in his own right
	Kurt Moylan (born 1939)	Native Hawaiian, Chinese American	Republican	Guam	July 20, 1969	January 6, 1975	Appointed Secretary before being elected lieutenant governor in his own right from January 4, 1971; Lost reelection
	Kaleo Moylan (born 1966)	Native Hawaiian, Chinese American	Republican	Guam	January 6, 2003	January 1, 2007	Retired to run unsuccessfully for nomination to governor

== See also ==
- Governor (United States)
- List of current United States governors
- List of female governors in the United States
- List of United States governors born outside the United States
