= 1986 Hawaii gubernatorial election =

- November 4, 1986
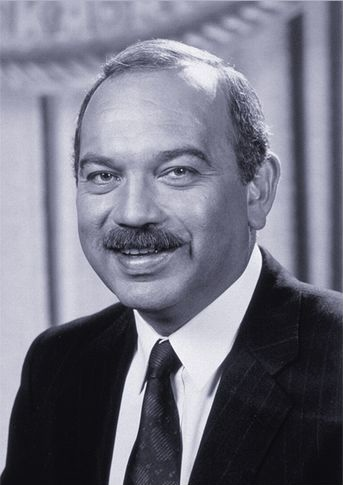

Nominee	John D. Waiheʻe III	D. G. Anderson
Party	Democratic	Republican
Running mate	Ben Cayetano	John Henry Felix
Popular vote	173,655	160,460
Percentage	51.98%	48.02%
- County results Waiheʻe: 50–60%
Governor before election
George Ariyoshi
Democratic
Elected Governor
John D. Waiheʻe III
Democratic

The 1986 Hawaii gubernatorial election was Hawaii's eighth gubernatorial election. The election was held on November 4, 1986, and resulted in a victory for the Democratic candidate, Lt. Gov. John D. Waiheʻe III over the Republican candidate, State Senator D. G. Anderson. Waihee received more votes than Anderson in every county in the state.

This was Anderson's second loss for the position of governor, having previously lost the 1982 election.

== Primaries ==
Primary elections were held on September 20, 1986.

=== Democratic primary ===
Candidates and primary votes:

- John D. Waihee III, lieutenant governor: 45.60%
- Cecil Heftel, United States representative: 36.25%
- Patsy Mink, former United States representative: 16.41%
- Anthony N. Hodges: 0.75%
- Billy Kuaiwa: 0.40%
- Paul H. Snider: 0.32%
- John P. Fritz: 0.28%

=== Republican primary ===
Candidates and primary votes:

- D. G. Anderson, state senator: 94.61%
- Wayne C. Thiessen: 3.12%
- Charles Hirayasu: 1.30%
- Jack J. Mahakian: 0.98%

== General election ==
Hawaii gubernatorial election, 1986
Party	Candidate	Votes	%	±%
Democratic	John D. Waihe'e III	173,655	51.98	+6.75
Republican	D. G. Anderson	160,460	48.02	+21.88
Majority		13,195	3.95	−12.64
Turnout		334,115	34.63	+2.30
Democratic hold		Swing		

=== By county ===
County	John Waihee Democratic		Andy Anderson Republican		Margin		Total votes cast
County	#	%	#	%	#	%	Total votes cast
Hawaii	21,153	54.1%	17,954	45.9%	3,199	8.2%	39,107
Honolulu	124,920	50.7%	121,327	49.3%	3,593	1.4%	39,107
Kauaʻi	11,088	58.9%	7,723	41.1%	3,365	17.8%	18,811
Maui	16,494	55.1%	13,456	44.9%	3,038	10.2%	29,950
Totals	173,655	51.98%	160,460	48.02%	13,195	3.96%	334,115
