= Nelson Doi =

American politician (1922–2015)

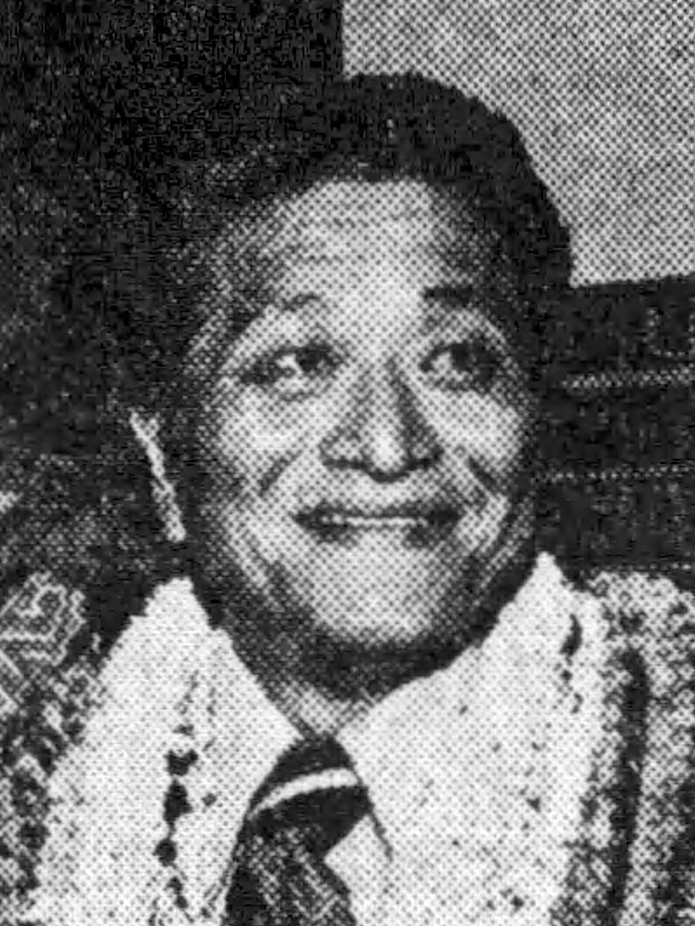

6th Lieutenant Governor of Hawaii
- In office December 2, 1974 – December 2, 1978
- Governor: George Ariyoshi
- Preceded by: George Ariyoshi
- Succeeded by: Jean King

Personal details
- Born: Nelson Kiyoshi Doi; January 1, 1922 Pahoa, Territory of Hawaii
- Died: May 16, 2015 (aged 93) Waimea, Hawaii
- Party: Democratic
- Spouse: Eiko Doi
- Children: 2
- Profession: Judge, Politician

Nelson Kiyoshi Doi (Japanese: 土井 清, romanized: Doi Kiyoshi, January 1, 1922 – May 16, 2015), was the sixth lieutenant governor of Hawaii from 1974 to 1978 in the first elected administration of Governor George Ariyoshi. Doi was a member of the Hawaii Democratic Party.

== Early and legislative years ==
Doi grew up in Hilo and Kawaihae on the island of Hawai'i and attended Honoka'a High School. He went on to attend the University of Hawaiʻi at Mānoa, where he was president of the Associated Students of the University of Hawaii from December 1944 to June 1945.

Doi began his political career at the 1950 Hawaiʻi State Constitutional Convention that drafted the first state laws for Hawaiʻi that went into effect in 1959. During that Convention, Doi noted "a frustration that began to ferment" amongst the delegates. In the 1954 election, that frustration led to a huge victory for the Democrats, who seized control of what had been a territory dominated by Republicans. Doi, representing Hawaii Island, was one of the victorious Democrats. Other Democrats first elected in 1954 included the late U.S. Senator Dan Inouye, former Governor George Ariyoshi, the late U.S. Senator Spark Matsunaga.

After that victory in 1954, Doi then served in the Hawaii Territorial Senate in 1955–1959 and then in the Hawaiʻi State Senate from 1959 to 1969, including as Senate President from 1963 to 1964. During his tenure in the Senate, Doi was frequently at odds with Governor John A. Burns and Senate Democratic leaders.

In 1968, Doi was one of 82 delegates to the Hawaii Constitutional Convention held at McKinley High School. Among the issues addressed at the Convention were reapportioning legislative districts, mandating an annual 60-day legislative session, lengthening the terms of judges, authorizing collective bargaining for public employees, strengthening privacy rights for individuals, enhancing county home rule, and creating the Office of Hawaiian Affairs. Other prominent political figures who were among the delegates were George Ariyoshi, Frank Fasi, and Patricia Saiki.

== Judiciary and lieutenant governor ==
In 1970, Doi left the Hawaiʻi State Legislature, after being appointed to the Hawaii State Judiciary as a circuit court judge where he served for five years. Also in 1970, Doi entered the race for Lieutenant Governor of Hawaii, at first aligning himself with fellow Democrat and gubernatorial candidate Thomas Gill. After disagreements with Gill on commitments on political appointments, Doi decided to run independently. Ultimately, both Gill and Doi were defeated by John A. Burns and George Ariyoshi, respectively.

In 1974, Doi was chosen as the running mate for George Ariyoshi. Fourteen months earlier, Ariyoshi, the previous Lieutenant Governor, became Acting Governor upon the incapacitating illness of longtime Governor John A. Burns. Ariyoshi and Doi emerged victorious, becoming the first-ever Japanese Americans to hold simultaneously the Governor and Lieutenant Governor posts of any state in the U.S. Doi was the second Japanese American to hold the position of state Lieutenant Governor.

== Later years ==
After his service as Lieutenant Governor, Doi ran for Mayor of Honolulu and was defeated by Frank Fasi. Doi also ran in the 1977 Honolulu Marathon, finishing in 4 hours, 30 minutes, and "besting his wife by just one minute". In 1977, he also was appointed to then-territorial High Court of the Marshall Islands. Doi was appointed as Chief Justice of the court in 1985. Upon his retirement from that court, Doi taught at various schools in Japan. Doi returned to Waimea on the Big Island of Hawaiʻi where he helped build the North Hawaiʻi Community Hospital.

== See also ==
- List of Asian American jurists
- List of minority governors and lieutenant governors in the United States

Party political offices
Preceded by George Ariyoshi	Democratic nominee for Lieutenant Governor of Hawaii; 1974	Succeeded by Jean King
Political offices
Preceded by George Ariyoshi	Lieutenant Governor of Hawaii; 1974 - 1978	Succeeded by Jean King
