= D. G. Anderson =

American politician from Hawaii

Andy Anderson

Personal details
- Born: February 10, 1930 (age 96) Honolulu, Hawaii, U.S.
- Party: Republican (Before 2002); Democratic (2002–present)

Dominis Garrida Anderson (born February 10, 1930), also popularly known as D.G. Anderson and Andy Anderson, is an American politician, real estate developer and businessman from Honolulu, Hawai'i. His ethnic background is diverse with Hawaiian, Norwegian, English, Scottish, and Portuguese ancestries.

Anderson previously owned John Dominis Restaurant in Kaka'ako, which he built in 1974 and sold in 2005 to Japan-based owner Ocean Investments, LLC. He built and later sold a second John Dominis Restaurant in Newport Beach, California. In the earlier points of his life, he owned the largest camera shop in Hawai'i (Waterhouse Photo), the largest hi-fi store (Gems in Hawaii), the largest record store in both Hawai'i and Phoenix, Arizona, a toy company called Anekona Toys and a ranching supply store in Kona, Hawai'i. Anderson currently owns Michel's at The Colony Surf, a premier oceanfront restaurant in Waikīkī, dubbed as the "Most Romantic Restaurant" by the TV series Lifestyle of the Rich and Famous. He also owns commercial real estate properties both in Hawai'i and mainland USA.

Anderson's real estate development projects include The Bluffs in Waimea, consisting of 23 lots on a lush hillside overlooking the ocean between Waimea bay and Hale'iwa, and Sunset Beach Colony, consisting of 29 subdivided parcels on beachfront 19.1 acre property fronting Velzyland and Kauna'oa Bay. Both projects are located on the North Shore on the island of Oahu. Anderson also owned Waimea Country Club, an 18-hole, 6,646-yard, par-72 course, 239 acre land on the Island of Hawai'i, until it was sold in 2012.

Anderson was a member of the Hawai'i State House of Representatives from 1962 to 1966. He was a member of the Hawai'i State Senate from 1967 to 1983. In 1968 and 1972, Anderson ran unsuccessfully to become the Republican Mayor of Honolulu. Anderson served as managing director of Honolulu (under Mayor Frank Fasi) from January 2, 1985, to July 3, 1986. In 1982 and 1986, as Chairman of the Hawai'i Republican Party, he ran for Governor of Hawai'i, losing to incumbent George Ariyoshi and John D. Waiheʻe respectively. In 2002, Anderson joined the Hawai'i Democratic Party and ran for the party's nomination for governor, losing to incumbent Lieutenant Governor Mazie K. Hirono.

Party political offices
Preceded by John R. Leopold	Republican nominee for Governor of Hawaii; 1982, 1986	Succeeded by Fred Hemmings
