= James Kealoha =

American politician

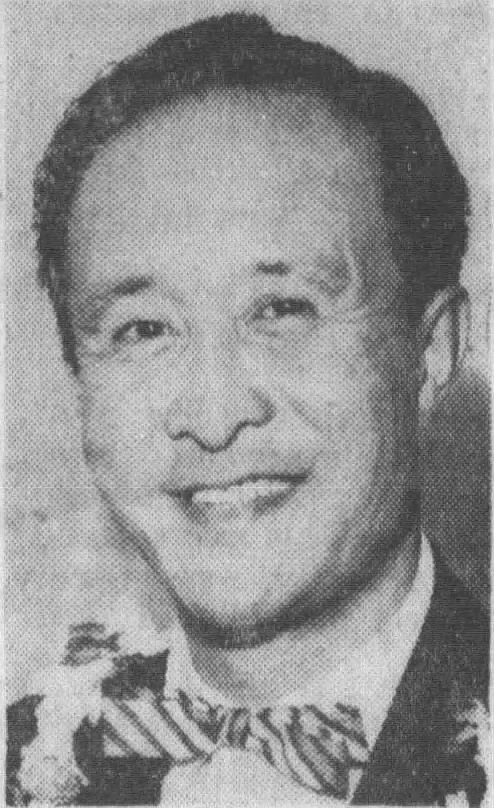
- Kealoha in 1959

1st Lieutenant Governor of Hawaii
- In office August 21, 1959 – December 3, 1962
- Governor: William F. Quinn
- Preceded by: Position established
- Succeeded by: William S. Richardson

Personal details
- Born: James Kimo Kealoha; April 29, 1908 Pahoa, Territory of Hawaii
- Died: August 24, 1983 (aged 75) Honolulu, Hawaii, U.S.
- Party: Republican
- Profession: Politician

James Kimo Kealoha (April 29, 1908 – August 24, 1983) was an American politician who served as the first lieutenant governor of Hawaii in the administration of Governor of Hawaiʻi William F. Quinn. Prior to his election as Lieutenant Governor, Kealoha served a number of years as a legislator on Hawaii island (the "Big Island"), distinguishing himself as a respected leader.

== Early years ==
James Kealoha was born on April 29, 1908, in Pahoa on Hawaii island to Lee Chau and Alice Makanui Kealoha. His father was a Cantonese immigrant who had come to Hawaii as a plantation laborer. While growing up James was raised by his grandparents, whose name he assumed. Later he decided to add Kimo as his middle name. In the Chinese community in Hawaii, he was commonly known as Lee Yat Wo.

He graduated from Hilo High School in 1926 and started working as a clerk for Kwong See Wo, a grocery store in Hilo. In 1929 he married Miulan Young, and together they had two daughters, Leihulu Emma and Leiohu Lillie. In the next year he opened his own grocery, which he operated until 1948.

== Legislative career ==
In 1934, Kealoha was elected to the Hawaii Territorial House of Representatives, serving as speaker pro tem. He was elected for a second term two years later. In 1938, he successfully ran as a Democrat for a seat in the Territorial Senate, where he served as president pro tem. That same year, he switched to the Republican Party, expressing his unhappiness with the in-fighting amongst island Democrats. People often referred to Kealoha as the "Wonder Boy of Hawaiian politics" because he consistently won elections by sizable margins.

In 1940 Kealoha was elected to the Hawaii County Board of Supervisors, where he won re-election for three successive terms. In 1946, he suffered his first-ever defeat in his political career, losing in a bid for Hawaii County Chairman. In 1948, he ran again, winning the first of six consecutive terms as Hawaii County Chairman.

== Lieutenant governor ==
Kealoha served for years as Hawaii County Chairman, because of his popularity and leadership, was selected in 1959 by the Republican Party as its candidate for lieutenant governor in the state of Hawaii's first gubernatorial election, running alongside William F. Quinn, the party's candidate for governor. The pairing worked well, as Quinn and Kealoha defeated their Democratic opponents John A. Burns and Mitsuyuki Kido. Kealoha was the first Chinese American and Native Hawaiian to be elected as a lieutenant governor in the United States.

Kealoha's term as lieutenant governor was described as "unpleasant" for him. Governor Quinn was not confident in allowing a Native Hawaiian, even a friend like Kealoha, to make important decisions on his behalf. Kealoha found himself relegated to presiding at ceremonial functions. He also had disagreements with Governor Quinn about the issue of political patronage.

Kealoha gained national attention during the close 1960 United States presidential election, in which John F. Kennedy defeated Richard Nixon both nationally and in Hawaii. Errors in the official tabulation resulted in Nixon being declared the winner of Hawaii's electoral votes by 141 votes, despite inconsistencies in the tabulation sheets. After ordering two audits of the tabulation sheets (but being unable to inspect the actual ballots cast), Kealoha certified the vote total in favor of his fellow Republican Nixon, resulting in the call of national Democrats for a recount. The recount extended past the Constitutionally-required December 19 date for casting electoral votes; as a result, both "unofficial" Democratic and "official" Republican electoral slates met at the ʻIolani Palace and submitted competing certificates of ascertainment for Hawaii's three electoral votes. The result was finally resolved on the floor of the United States Senate during the electoral college certification process.

== 1962 election for Governor ==
After growing tensions between Kealoha and Quinn, especially on the role of the Lieutenant Governor, Kealoha challenged Quinn in the Republican gubernatorial primary in 1962, characterizing himself as a "native son" and a "local boy" in what was described as "a bitter contest". Quinn prevailed, garnering 44,095 votes to 33,277 for Kealoha (Boylan). Quinn, in a quest for reconciliation, appointed Kealoha as the executive officer for the Hawaii exhibit at the New York World's Fair.

Later in the general election of that year, Quinn was soundly defeated by his Democratic opponent, John A. Burns. Some analysts have said that the decision by Kealoha to challenge Governor Quinn in the primary cost the Republicans the election. For many voters the primary was another triumph of the Haole over the Hawaiian, a recurring theme with the Republican Party, causing voters to defect to the Democrats or refused to vote.

== Comeback attempts ==
After losing in 1962, Kealoha still had political aspirations but failed to win an election again. In 1966 he ran for a seat in the U.S. House of Representatives against incumbent Democrat Spark Matsunaga and was defeated. Of note in that campaign was Kealoha's vocal opposition to the war in Vietnam which shocked fellow Republicans and enthused Democrats in their election efforts (Harada). In 1968 he unsuccessfully ran for Mayor of Hawaii County, losing to Shunichi Kimura.

== Business difficulties and later years ==
In addition to his defeats at the polls, Kealoha endured two business setbacks. In 1967, he filed bankruptcy in connection with his involvement in a restaurant and show concession at the Montreal Expo in Canada (Cavaliero and Sherman). In 1977, he and his wife were victimized in a hotel and condominium scam that also resulted in bankruptcy. In his later years Kealoha grew papayas in Hawaii and owned a farm in Salem, Oregon. He died on August 24, 1983, in Honolulu with interment at Homelani Cemetery in Hilo.

== James Kealoha Park ==
In 1963, James Kealoha Beach Park on Hawaii Island was named in his honor. Also known to residents as "4-Miles," the park is located four miles from the Hilo Post Office, which has been historically considered the starting point for all mileage markers originating from Hilo (Clark 25). James Kealoha Beach Park is featured in a song on the 1979 album Na Pana Kaulana o Keaukaha by Edith Kanakaʻole.

== See also ==
- List of minority governors and lieutenant governors in the United States

== Resources ==
- Black, Forrest. "Kealoha Campaigns for Governor as 'Native Son.'" Honolulu Star-Bulletin, August 31, 1962.
- Borg, Jim. "James Kealoha Dead at 75." Honolulu Advertiser, July 25, 1983.
- Boylan, Dan and T. Michael Holmes. John A. Burns: The Man and His Times. University of Hawaii Press, 2000.
- Casey, Brian. "Mr. Kealoha's 'Sunny Jim.'" Honolulu Advertiser, December 13, 1959.
- Cavaliero, Eric, and Eddie Sherman. "Kealoha Files Bankruptcy for Exhibition." Honolulu Advertiser, September 11, 1967.
- Clark, John R.K. Beaches of the Big Island. University of Hawaii Press, 1985.
- Goodfader, Al. "Quinn for Governor; Suggests Kealoha for 'No. 2' Post." Honolulu Advertiser, April 5, 1959.
- Harada, Wayne. "Kealoha Stand Surprises Spark." Honolulu Advertiser, October 8, 1966.
- Kim, Hyung-Chan S.(Editor). Distinguished Asian Americans : A Biographical Dictionary. Westport, CT, USA: Greenwood Publishing Group, Incorporated, 1999. p 173
- McManus, Larry. "Kealoha's Speech Cheers Democrats." Honolulu Advertiser, October 8, 1966.

Party political offices
First	Republican nominee for Lieutenant Governor of Hawaii; 1959	Succeeded by Calvin McGregor
Political offices
Preceded by Position established	Lieutenant Governor of Hawaii; 1959–1962	Succeeded by William S. Richardson
