= 1974 Hawaii gubernatorial election =

- November 5, 1974
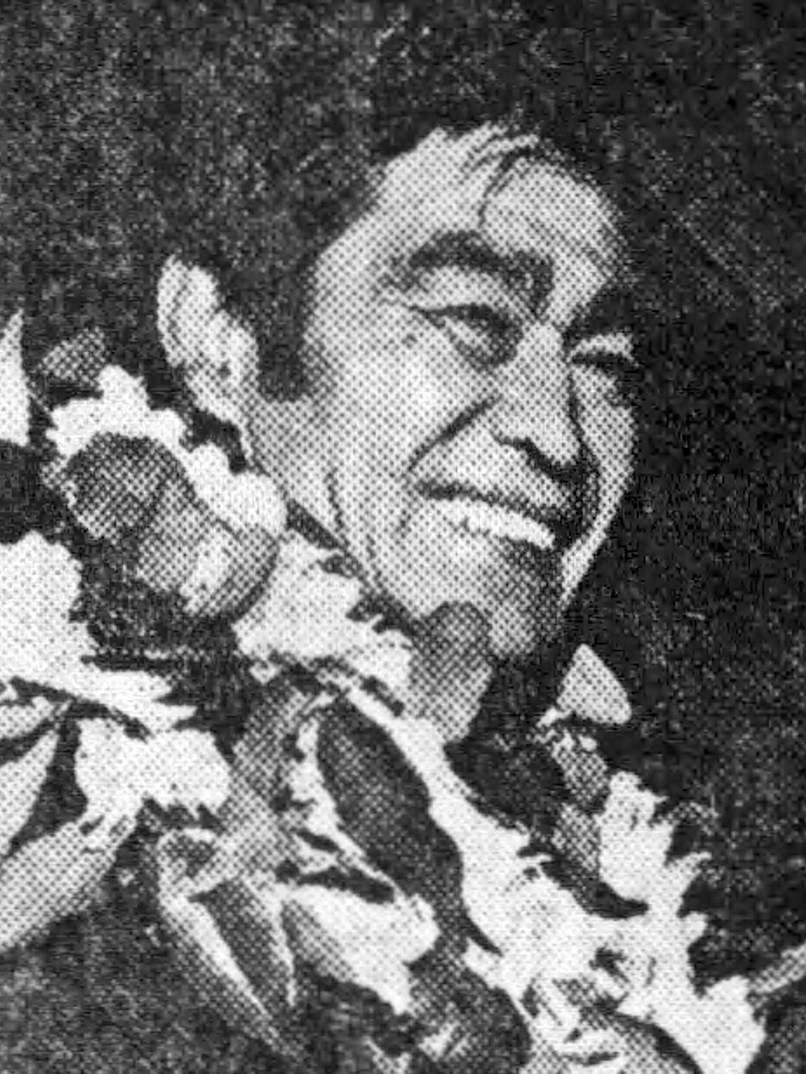

| Nominee | George Ariyoshi | Randolph Crossley |
| Party | Democratic | Republican |
| Running mate | Nelson Doi | Benjamin F. Dillingham II |
| Popular vote | 136,262 | 113,388 |
| Percentage | 54.58% | 45.42% |
- County results Ariyoshi: 50–60% 60–70%
Governor before election
John A. Burns
Democratic
Elected Governor
George Ariyoshi
Democratic

The 1974 Hawaii gubernatorial election was Hawaii's fifth gubernatorial election. The election was held on November 5, 1974, and resulted in a victory for the Democratic candidate, Lt. Gov. George Ariyoshi, over Republican candidate, former State Senator Randolph Crossley. Ariyoshi received more votes than Crossley in every county in the state.

Although he was by law lieutenant governor of Hawaii at the time of this election, George Ariyoshi had had all the power and responsibility of the governorship since October 26, 1973, when Governor John A. Burns was incapacitated due to illness and Ariyoshi was made acting governor.

This was Crossley's second failed attempt to win the governorship, having previously lost the 1966 election.

== Primaries ==
Both the Democratic and Republican were held on October 5, 1974, with the Democratic primary strongly contested.

=== Democratic primary ===
Candidates and primary votes:

- George Ariyoshi, lieutenant governor: 36.18%
- Frank Fasi, mayor of Honolulu: 31.47%
- Thomas Gill, former lieutenant governor: 30.08%
- David C. McClung, senate president: 1.79%
- Henry deFries: 0.49%

=== Republican primary ===
Candidates and primary votes:

- Randolph Crossley, former state senator: 82.47%
- Joseph K. Hao: 17.53%

== General election ==
=== Results ===
Hawaii gubernatorial election, 1974
| Party | Candidate | Votes | % | ±% |
|---|---|---|---|---|
| Democratic | George Ariyoshi | 136,262 | 54.58 | −3.07 |
| Republican | Randolph Crossley | 113,388 | 45.42 | +3.07 |
| Majority | | 22,874 | 9.16 | −6.13 |
| Turnout | | 249,650 | 32.43 | +1.38 |
| Democratic hold | | Swing | | |

==== By county ====
| County | George Ariyoshi Democratic | | Randolph Crossley Republican | | Margin | | Total votes cast |
| County | # | % | # | % | # | % | Total votes cast |
|---|---|---|---|---|---|---|---|
| Hawaii | 18,179 | 63.9% | 10,261 | 36.1% | 7,918 | 27.8% | 28,440 |
| Honolulu | 99,108 | 52.3% | 90,317 | 47.7% | 8,791 | 4.6% | 189,425 |
| Kauaʻi | 8,315 | 63.2% | 4,843 | 36.8% | 3,472 | 26.4% | 13,158 |
| Maui | 10,660 | 57.2% | 7,967 | 42.8% | 2,693 | 14.4% | 18,627 |
| Totals | 136,262 | 54.6% | 113,388 | 45.4% | 22,874 | 9.2% | 249,650 |
