= 1982 Hawaii gubernatorial election =

- November 2, 1982
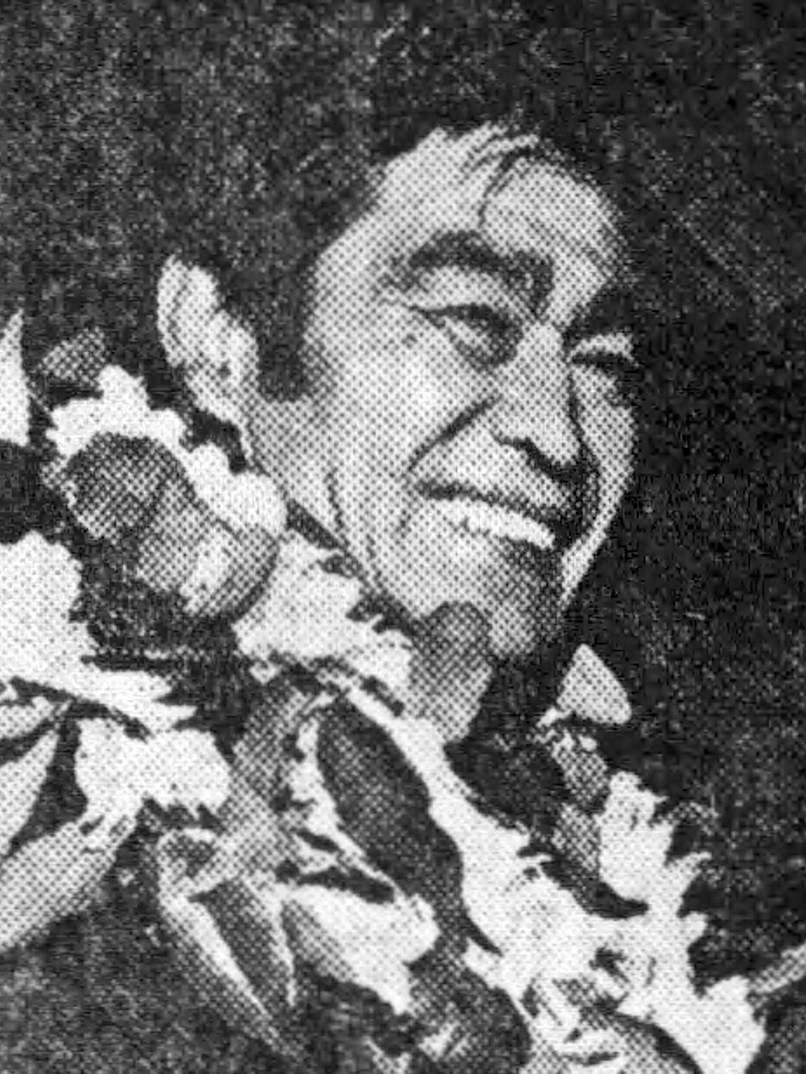

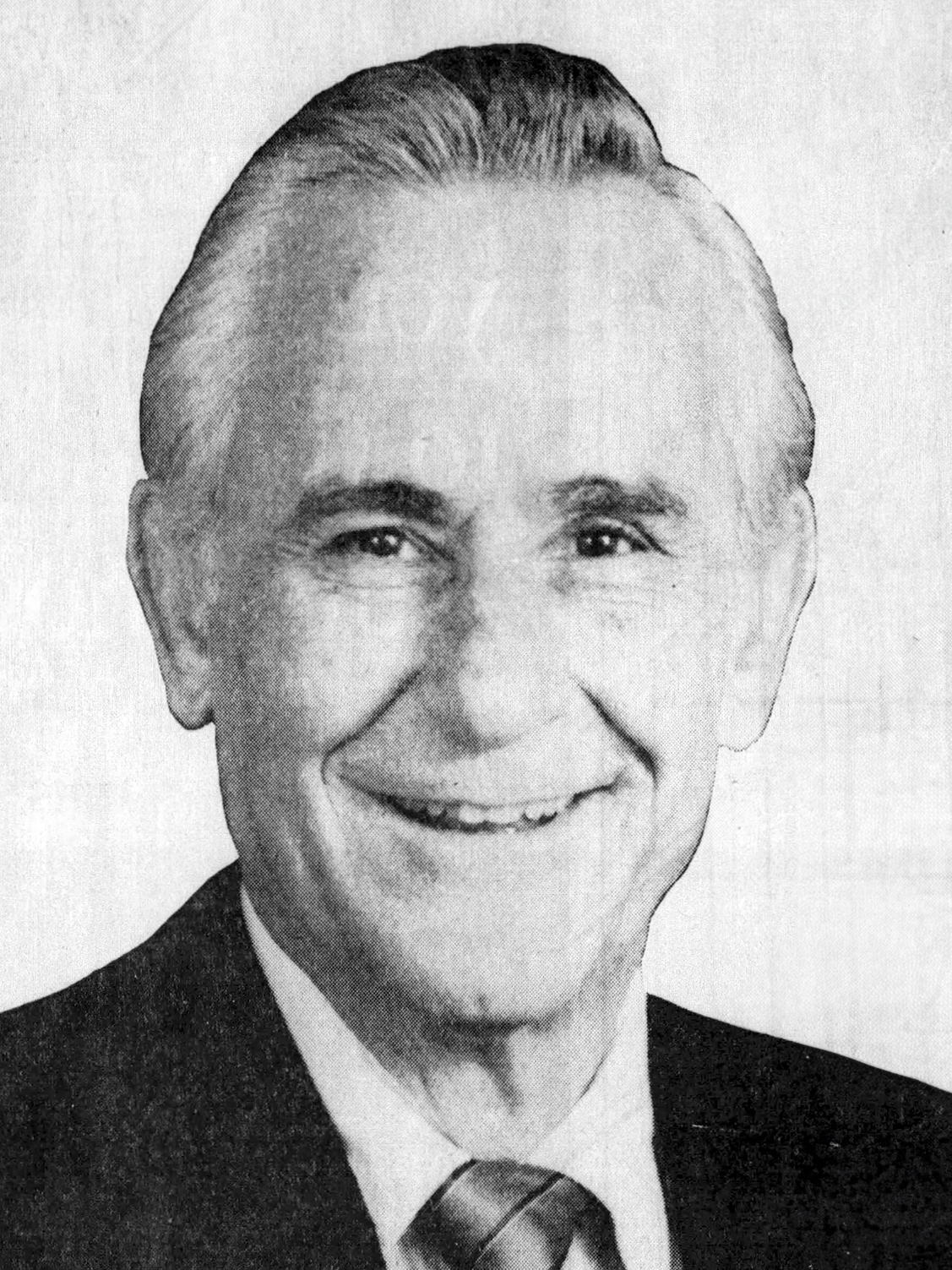

| Nominee | George Ariyoshi | Frank Fasi | D. G. Anderson |
| Party | Democratic | Independent Democrat | Republican |
| Running mate | John D. Waihee III | Randy A. K. Piltz | Pat Saiki |
| Popular vote | 141,043 | 89,303 | 81,507 |
| Percentage | 45.23% | 28.64% | 26.14% |
- County results Ariyoshi: 40–50% 50–60%
Governor before election
George Ariyoshi
Democratic
Elected Governor
George Ariyoshi
Democratic

The 1982 Hawaii gubernatorial election was Hawaii's seventh gubernatorial election. The election was held on November 2, 1982, and resulted in a victory for the Democratic candidate, governor George Ariyoshi, over Frank Fasi, running as an Independent Democrat, and the Republican candidate, state senator D. G. Anderson. Ariyoshi received more votes than any other candidate in every county in the state.

== Primaries ==
Primary elections were held on September 18, 1982.

=== Democratic primary ===
Candidates and primary votes:

- George Ariyoshi, governor: 53.87%
- Jean Sadako King, lieutenant governor: 44.66%
- Billy Kuaiwa: 0.57%
- Frank DeCambra: 0.32%
- John P. Fritz: 0.23%
- Joseph Johns: 0.20%
- Arthur F. Stebbing: 0.15%

=== Republican primary ===
Candidates and primary votes:

- D. G. Anderson, state senator: 96.79%
- Jack J. Mahakian: 1.66%
- Gabriel Juarez: 1.55%

== General election ==
=== Results ===
Fasi finished second statewide and in Honolulu County.

Hawaii gubernatorial election, 1982
| Party | Candidate | Votes | % | ±% |
|---|---|---|---|---|
| Democratic | George Ariyoshi (incumbent) | 141,043 | 45.23 | −9.25 |
| Independent Democrat | Frank Fasi | 89,303 | 28.64 | +28.64 |
| Republican | D. G. Anderson | 81,507 | 26.14 | −18.11 |
| Majority | | 51,740 | 16.59 | +6.37 |
| Turnout | | 311,853 | 32.33 | −4.24 |
| Democratic hold | | Swing | | |

==== By county ====
| County | George Ariyoshi Democratic | | Frank Fasi Independent Democrat | | Andy Anderson Republican | | Margin | | Total votes cast |
| County | # | % | # | % | # | % | # | % | Total votes cast |
|---|---|---|---|---|---|---|---|---|---|
| Hawaii | 18,853 | 51.8% | 6,798 | 18.7% | 10,767 | 29.6% | 8,086 | 22.2% (Note: Compares margin over Anderson.) | 36,418 |
| Honolulu | 97,848 | 42.5% | 72,334 | 31.4% | 59,893 | 26.0% | 25,514 | 11.1% | 230,075 |
| Kauaʻi | 10,474 | 59.9% | 3,248 | 18.6% | 3,764 | 21.5% | 6,710 | 38.4% | 17,486 |
| Maui | 13,868 | 49.8% | 6,923 | 24.8% | 7,083 | 25.4% | 6,785 | 24.4% | 37,874 |
| Totals | 141,043 | 45.2% | 89,303 | 28.6% | 81,507 | 26.1% | 51,740 | 18.6% | 311,853 |
