= 1970 Hawaii gubernatorial election =

- November 3, 1970
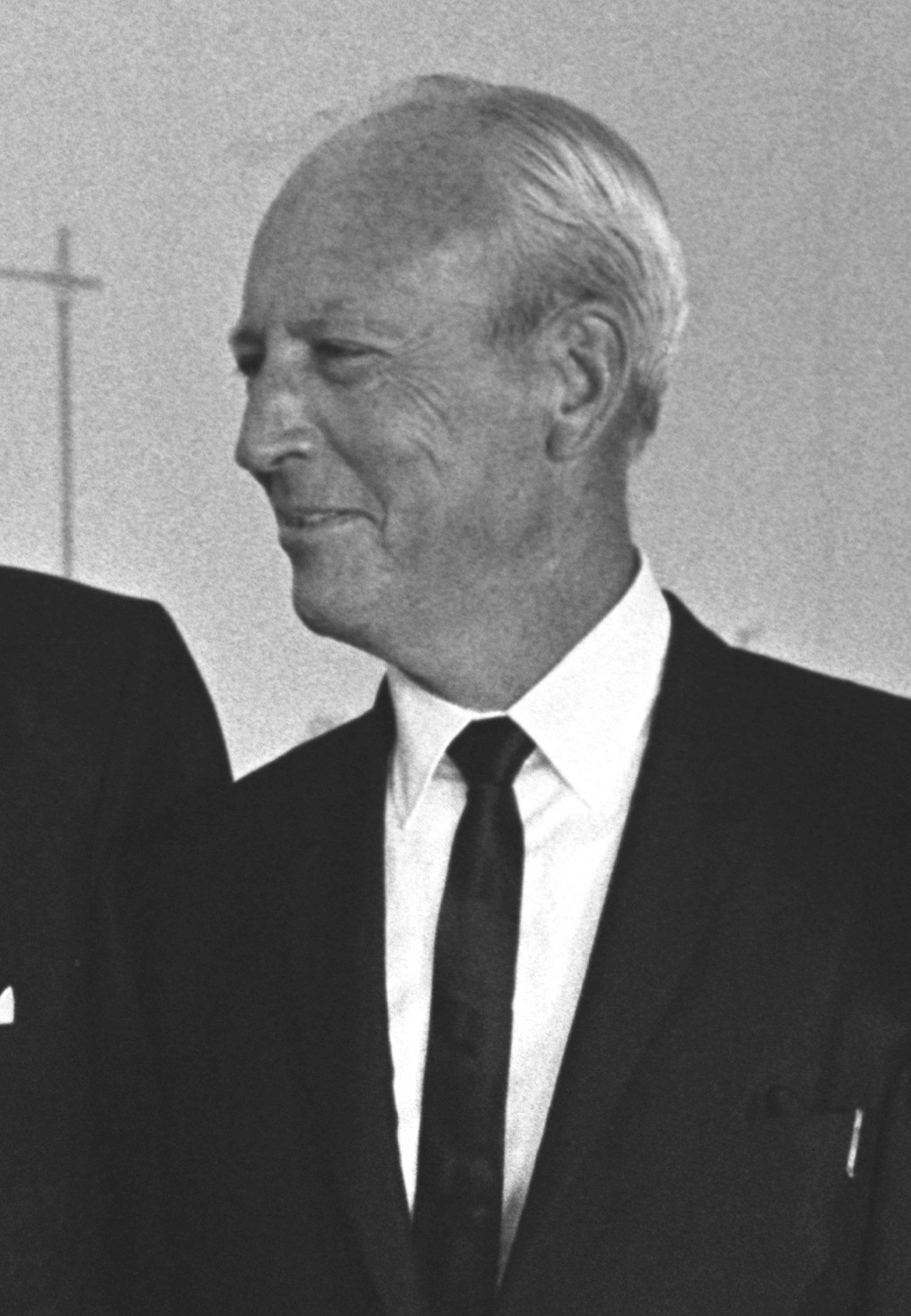

Nominee	John A. Burns	Samuel King
Party	Democratic	Republican
Running mate	George Ariyoshi	Ralph Kiyosaki
Popular vote	137,812	101,249
Percentage	57.65%	42.35%
- County results Burns: 50–60% 60–70%
Governor before election
John A. Burns
Democratic
Elected Governor
John A. Burns
Democratic

The 1970 Hawaii gubernatorial election was Hawaii's fourth gubernatorial election. The election was held on November 3, 1970, and resulted in a victory for the Democratic candidate, incumbent Governor of Hawaii John A. Burns over Republican candidate, Judge Samuel Pailthorpe King. Burns received more votes than King in every county in the state.

Both the Democratic and Republican primaries were contested, with the primary votes held on October 3, 1970.

Governor Burns became ill to the point of incapacitation for the last year of this term, and although he remained the governor in name, Lt. Gov. George Ariyoshi took the role of acting governor from October 26, 1973 until the end of this term on December 2, 1974.

== Democratic primary ==
=== Candidates ===
==== Declared ====
- John A. Burns, incumbent Governor
- G.J. Fontes
- Thomas Gill, Lieutenant Governor

=== Results ===
Democratic primary results
Party	Candidate	Votes	%
Democratic	John A. Burns	82,441	53.23
Democratic	Thomas Gill	69,209	44.69
Democratic	G.J. Fontes	3,232	2.09
Total votes		154,882	100.00

== Republican primary ==
=== Candidates ===
==== Declared ====
- Samuel Pailthorpe King, First Circuit Court and Family Court Judge
- Hebden Porteus, State Senator
- David Watumull

=== Results ===
Republican primary results
Party	Candidate	Votes	%
Republican	Samuel Pailthorpe King	20,605	49.29
Republican	Hebden Porteus	17,880	42.77
Republican	David Watumull	3,318	7.94
Total votes		41,803	100

== General election ==
=== Results ===
Hawaii gubernatorial election, 1970
Party	Candidate	Votes	%	±%
Democratic	John A. Burns (incumbent)	137,812	57.65	+6.59
Republican	Samuel Pailthorpe King	101,249	42.35	−6.59
Majority		36,563	15.29	+13.17
Turnout		239,061	31.05	−2.64
Democratic hold		Swing		

==== By county ====
County	John Burns Democratic		Sam King Republican		Margin		Total votes cast
County	#	%	#	%	#	%	Total votes cast
Hawaii	15,981	61.1%	10,191	38.9%	5,790	22.2%	26,172
Honolulu	102,607	55.9%	80,908	44.1%	21,699	11.8%	183,515
Kauaʻi	7,854	67.7%	3,754	32.3%	4,100	35.4%	11,608
Maui	11,370	64.0%	6,396	36.0%	4,974	28.0%	17,766
Totals	137,812	57.6%	101,249	42.4%	36,563	15.2%	239,061

Counties that flipped from Republican to Democratic

- Honolulu
