= William S. Richardson =

American judge

16th Chief Justice of the Hawaii Supreme Court
- In office 1966–1982
- Preceded by: Wilfred Chomatsu Tsukiyama
- Succeeded by: Herman T. F. Lum

2nd Lieutenant Governor of Hawaii
- In office December 3, 1962 – April 13, 1966
- Governor: John A. Burns
- Preceded by: James Kealoha
- Succeeded by: Andrew T. F. Ing

Chief Clerk for the Territorial Senate of Hawaii
- In office 1955–1959

Chair of the Democratic Party of Hawaii
- In office 1956–1962

Delegate to the Democratic National Convention from Hawaii
- In office 1956, 1960

President of the Hawaii State Bar Association
- In office 1961–1962

Trustee, Kamehameha Schools
- In office 1983–1992 Serving with Matsuo Takabuki, Myron B. Thompson, Henry H. Peters, and Oswald K. Stender
- Preceded by: Hung Wo Ching
- Succeeded by: Richard S. H. Wong

Personal details
- Born: William Shaw Richardson; December 22, 1919 Honolulu, Territory of Hawaii, United States
- Died: June 21, 2010 (aged 90) Honolulu, Hawaii
- Party: Democratic
- Spouse: Amy Corinne Ching
- Children: 3
- Education: University of Hawaiʻi at Mānoa and University of Cincinnati College of Law
- Profession: Judge, Politician
- Awards: Infantry Officer Candidate School Hall of Fame

Military service
- Branch/service: U.S. Army
- Years of service: 1942–1946
- Rank: Captain
- Unit: 1st Filipino Infantry Regiment; Judge Advocate General Corps

William Shaw Richardson (December 22, 1919 – June 21, 2010) was an American attorney, political figure, and chief justice of the Hawaii State Supreme Court from 1966 to 1982. Prior to his service as the top jurist in Hawaii, Richardson was lieutenant governor under John A. Burns. Previous to that tenure from 1956 to 1962 he was chairman of the Democratic Party of Hawaii.

== Early years ==
Richardson was born in Honolulu and was the son of Wilfred Kelelani Kānekoa Alapaʻi Richardson and Amy Lan Kyau Wung. He was of Chinese, Native Hawaiian, and Euro-American ancestry. His grandfather Colonel John Keone Likikine Richardson was a leading supporter of Queen Liliuokalani and the opposition to the overthrow of the Kingdom of Hawaii. Richardson referred to himself as "just a local boy from Hawaii." He was a graduate of Roosevelt High School, University of Hawaiʻi at Mānoa, and University of Cincinnati College of Law. Richardson served in World War II with the 1st Filipino Infantry Regiment as a platoon leader with a rank of Captain in the U.S. Army. After returning to Hawaii, he continued his military service in the Judge Advocate General Corps.

== Political career ==
Richardson was the Chief Clerk for the Senate of the Territory of Hawaii during the 1955 and 1957 terms. He chaired the Democratic Party of Hawaii from 1956 until 1962 and oversaw its transition from a territorial to a state party. Richardson attended the 1956 and 1960 Democratic National Conventions as a delegate representing Hawaii. In 1962, he successfully ran for Lieutenant Governor of Hawaii as a Democrat. In March 1966, Governor John A. Burns nominated Richardson as the 16th Chief Justice of the Supreme Court of Hawaii. The Senate confirmed him, and Richardson served as the chief justice from 1966 until 1982.

== Tenure as Chief Justice ==
Richardson's tenure as chief justice of the Supreme Court of Hawaii was marked by landmark decisions that recognized the precedent of the state's unique cultural and legal history; specifically the public's interests in the environment, and the rights of the indigenous Hawaiian people. Under Richardson, the court held that the public's interest in the natural environment may limit or prohibit commercial development of sensitive areas, particularly coastlines and beaches; that the public has the right to access Hawaii's beaches, and that land created by lava flows belonged to the state, not to nearby property owners. Richardson declared, "The western concept of exclusivity is not universally applicable in Hawaii." When two sugarcane plantations each sought the right to a water source, Richardson cited precedent from the court of the Kingdom of Hawai'i, and declared that the water belonged to neither of them, but to the state. The Richardson court recognized previously ignored claims of the indigenous Hawaiian people.

== Kamehameha Schools Bishop Estate ==
After retiring from the Chief Justice position, the Hawaii State Supreme Court appointed Richardson as a trustee of the Kamehameha Schools Bishop Estate, a position he held from 1983 until 1992.

== Legacy ==
Before his retirement from the bar, Richardson was honored with the naming of the state's only law school in his honor. The William S. Richardson School of Law was his crowning achievement, as he fought for its establishment for decades. Richardson, who is fondly referred to as "CJ" (for Chief Justice), was still involved with the development of the law school and regularly attended school functions up until his death in June 2010.

== See also ==
- List of minority governors and lieutenant governors in the United States

Party political offices
Preceded by Mitsuyuki Kido	Democratic nominee for Lieutenant Governor of Hawaii; 1962	Succeeded by Thomas Gill
Political offices
Preceded by James Kealoha	Lieutenant Governor of Hawaii; 1962–1966	Succeeded by Andrew T. F. Ing
