= 1978 Hawaii gubernatorial election =

- November 7, 1978
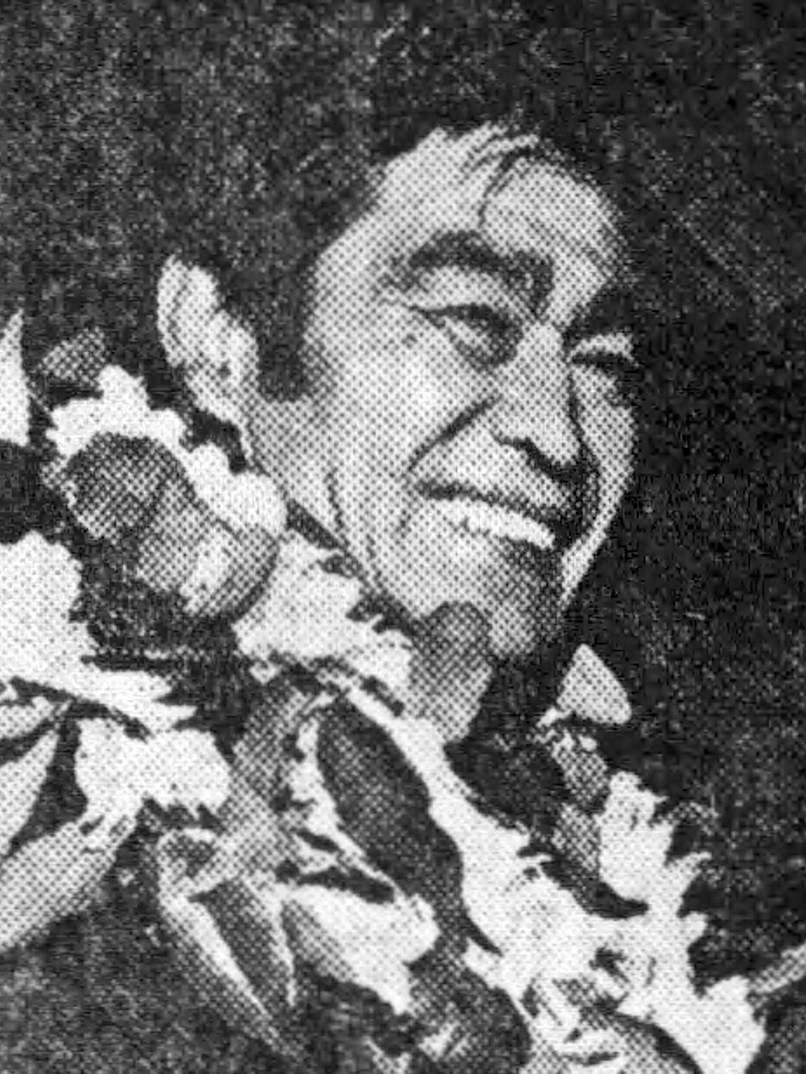

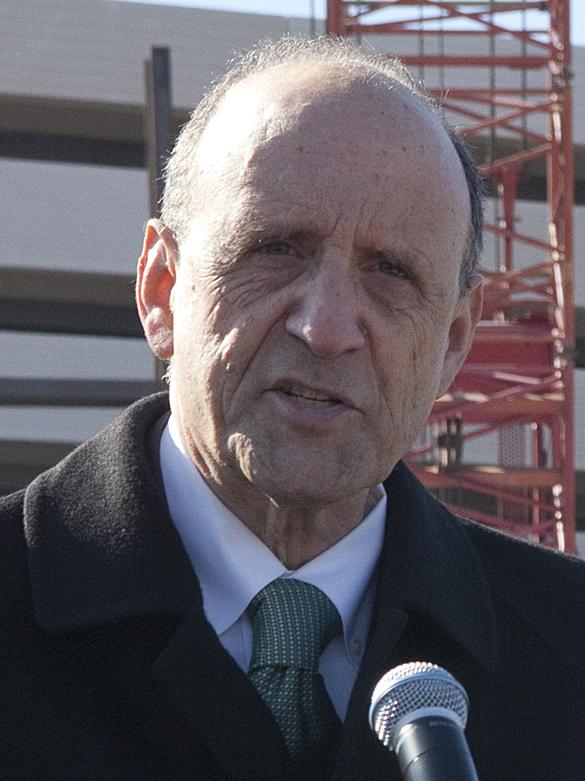
Nominee	George Ariyoshi	John Leopold
Party	Democratic	Republican
Running mate	Jean King	Virginia Isbell
Popular vote	153,394	124,610
Percentage	54.48%	44.25%
- County results Ariyoshi: 50–60% 60–70% 70–80%
Governor before election
George Ariyoshi
Democratic
Elected Governor
George Ariyoshi
Democratic

The 1978 Hawaii gubernatorial election was Hawaii's sixth gubernatorial election. The election was held on November 7, 1978, and resulted in a victory for the Democratic candidate, Governor George Ariyoshi, over Republican candidate, State Senator John R. Leopold and three other candidates. Ariyoshi received more votes than any other candidate in every county in the state.

== Primaries ==
Primary elections were held on October 7, 1978.

=== Democratic primary ===
Candidates and primary votes:

- George Ariyoshi, governor: 50.30%
- Frank Fasi, mayor of Honolulu: 48.91%
- Billy Kuaiwa: 0.53%
- Valentine Huihui: 0.26%

=== Republican primary ===
Candidates and primary votes:

- John R. Leopold, state senator: 91.56%
- Valentine K. Wessel: 4.88%
- Gabriel Juarez: 3.56%

=== Nonpartisan primary ===
Candidates and primary votes:

- Alema Leota: 58.85%
- Frank Pore: 41.15%

== General election ==
=== Results ===
Hawaii gubernatorial election, 1978
Party	Candidate	Votes	%	±%
Democratic	George Ariyoshi (incumbent)	153,394	54.48	−0.10
Republican	John R. Leopold	124,610	44.25	−1.17
Nonpartisan	Alema Leota	1,982	0.70	+0.70
Libertarian	Gregory Reeser	1,059	0.38	+0.38
Aloha Democratic	John Moore	542	0.19	+0.19
Majority		28,784	10.22	+1.06
Turnout		281,587	36.57	+4.14
Democratic hold		Swing		

==== By county ====
County	George Aroyoshi Democratic		John Lepold Republican		Various candidates Other parties		Margin		Total votes cast
County	#	%	#	%	#	%	#	%	Total votes cast
Hawaii	19,068	61.2%	11,821	37.9%	272	0.9%	7,247	23.3%	31,161
Honolulu	110,766	52.1%	98,853	46.5%	2,878	1.4%	11,913	6.6%	212,497
Kauaʻi	10,515	69.7%	4,434	29.4%	146	1.0%	6,081	40.3%	15,095
Maui	13,045	57.1%	9,502	41.6%	287	1.3%	3,543	15.5%	22,834
Totals	153,394	54.5%	124,610	44.3%	3,583	1.3%	28,784	10.2%	281,587
