= John D. Waiheʻe III =

Governor of Hawaii from 1986 to 1994

John Waiheʻe
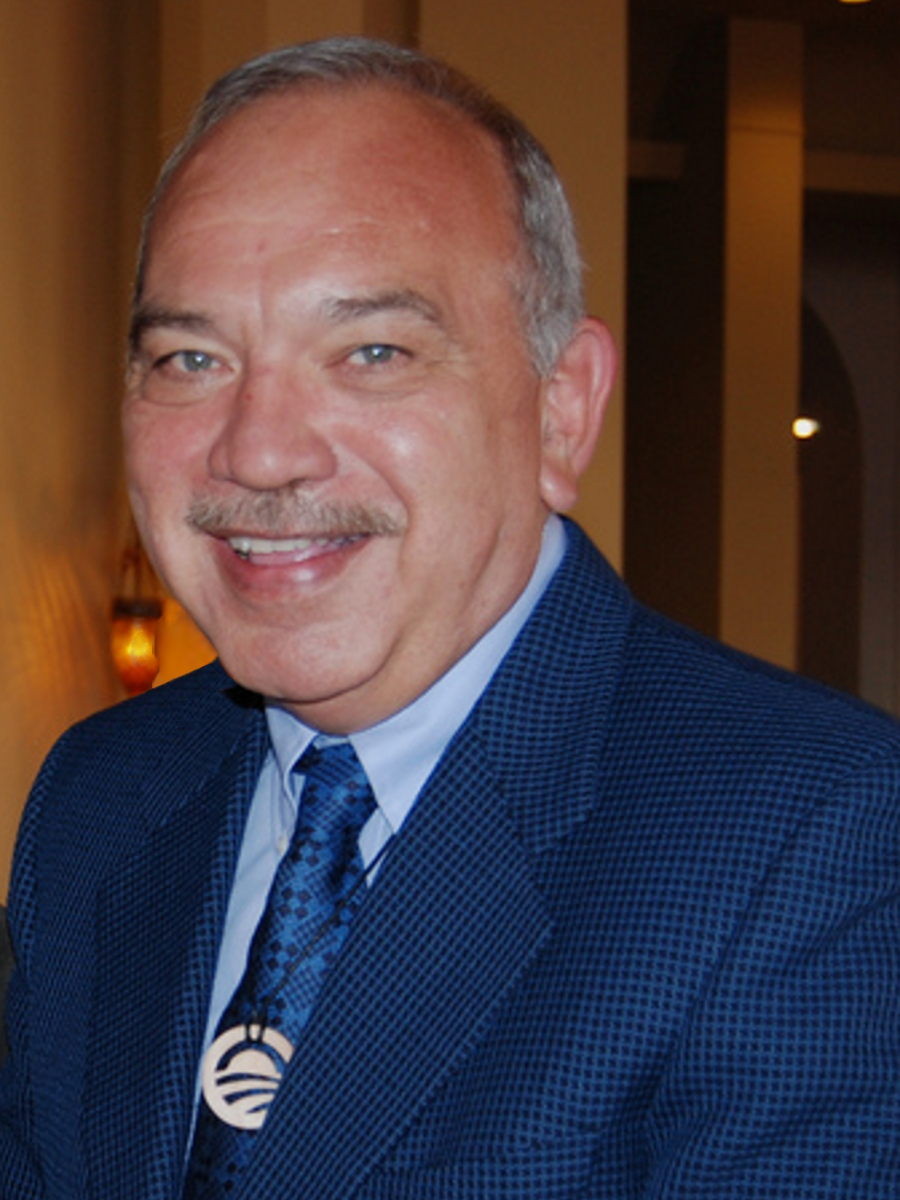

4th Governor of Hawaii
- In office December 2, 1986 – December 2, 1994
- Lieutenant: Ben Cayetano
- Preceded by: George Ariyoshi
- Succeeded by: Ben Cayetano

8th Lieutenant Governor of Hawaii
- In office December 2, 1982 – December 2, 1986
- Governor: George Ariyoshi
- Preceded by: Jean King
- Succeeded by: Ben Cayetano

Personal details
- Born: John David Waiheʻe III; May 19, 1946 (age 80) Honokaa, Hawaii Territory, U.S.
- Party: Democratic
- Spouse: Lynne Kobashigawa
- Children: 2, including John Waihee IV
- Education: Andrews University (BA); University of Hawaii, Manoa (JD)

John David Waiheʻe III (born May 19, 1946) is an American politician who served as the fourth governor of Hawaii from 1986 to 1994. He was the first American of Native Hawaiian descent to be elected to the office from any state of the United States. After his tenure in the governor's office, Waiheʻe became a nationally prominent attorney and lobbyist.

== Personal life and education ==
Waiheʻe was born in Honokaʻa on the Island of Hawaii. Upon graduating from Hawaiian Mission Academy, Waiheʻe attended classes at Andrews University in Michigan. There he obtained his Bachelor of Arts degrees in both business and history. He moved to Honolulu to attend the newly established William S. Richardson School of Law at the University of Hawaiʻi at Mānoa. He obtained his Juris Doctor degree in 1976. Waiheʻe is an Eagle Scout and recipient of the Distinguished Eagle Scout Award. He married Lynne Kobashigawa and one of his sons, John D. Waiheʻe IV, was a statewide elected official on the Office of Hawaiian Affairs Board of Trustees serving from 2000 to 2026.

== Politics ==
Waiheʻe started his political career as a delegate to the 1978 Hawaiʻi State Constitutional Convention where he was instrumental in the creation of the Office of Hawaiian Affairs and the adoption of the Hawaiian language as an official language of the state. He later served one term as a Democratic member of the Hawaiʻi State House of Representatives from 1981 to 1983. Waiheʻe was elected lieutenant governor of Hawaii under Governor George Ariyoshi, serving in that capacity until 1986. In 2008 Waiheʻe served as a delegate to the Democratic National Convention.

In 2011, Waiheʻe was appointed by Governor Neil Abercrombie to the Native Hawaiian Roll Commission, established by Act 195. Waiheʻe sits as the only Commissioner At-Large. In the following year, the Native Hawaiian Roll Commission actively began working on fulfilling its mandate to bring the Native Hawaiian people together by enrolling with the commission. This effort is now referred to as Kanaʻiolowalu.

Commissioner Waiheʻe is featured in an 11-part series of Frequently Asked Questions videos about Kanaʻiolowalu. The video footage was recorded on the campus of the William S. Richardson School of Law in the presence of a live audience composed primarily of law school students and faculty.

He pushed the state of Hawaii to adopt Hawaiian as an official language. He is proud of helping build Kapolei as Oahu's second city.

== Governorship ==
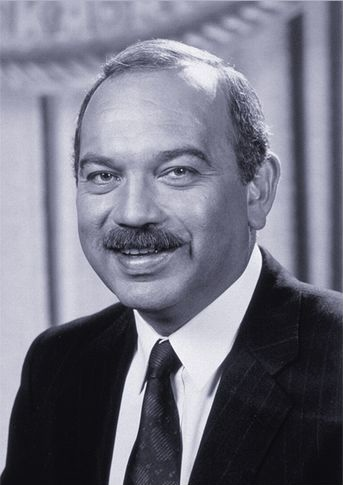
Waihe'e as governor.

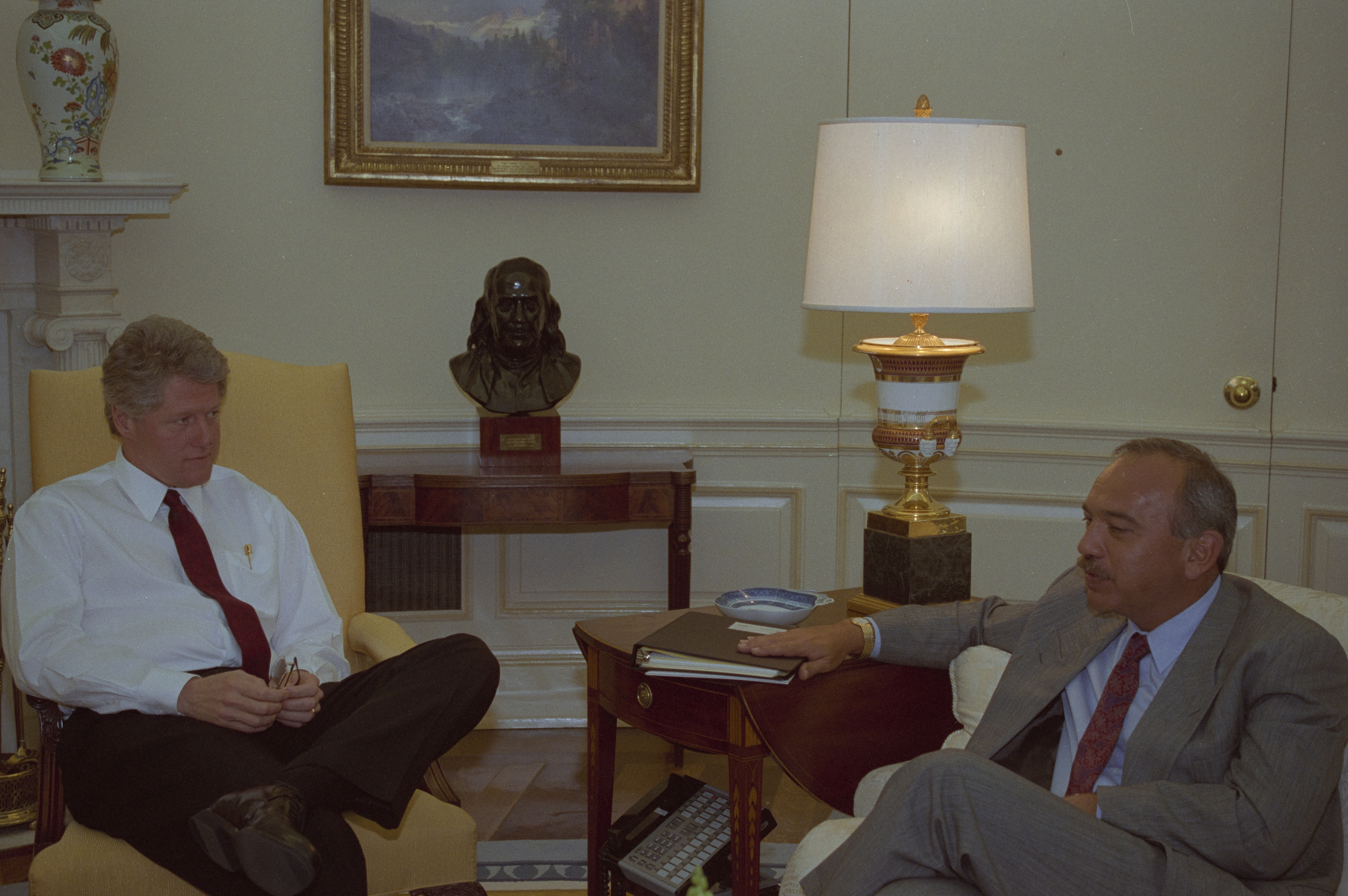
Waiheʻe with President Bill Clinton in April 1993

Waiheʻe successfully ran for the governor's office sharing a ticket with state senator Ben Cayetano. Cayetano became Waiheʻe's lieutenant governor for two terms; both were re-elected in 1990. During much of his term, Hawaiʻi experienced a boom in the tourism industry and increased foreign investment, especially from Japan. The issue of Hawaiian sovereignty also took on increased importance as the centennial anniversary of the overthrow of the Kingdom of Hawaiʻi (when Queen Liliʻuokalani was deposed) occurred. Waiheʻe left office in 1994, having served the maximum two terms in office as permitted by the Constitution of Hawaiʻi that he had helped to author. His lieutenant governor won the election to succeed Waiheʻe.

== Retirement ==
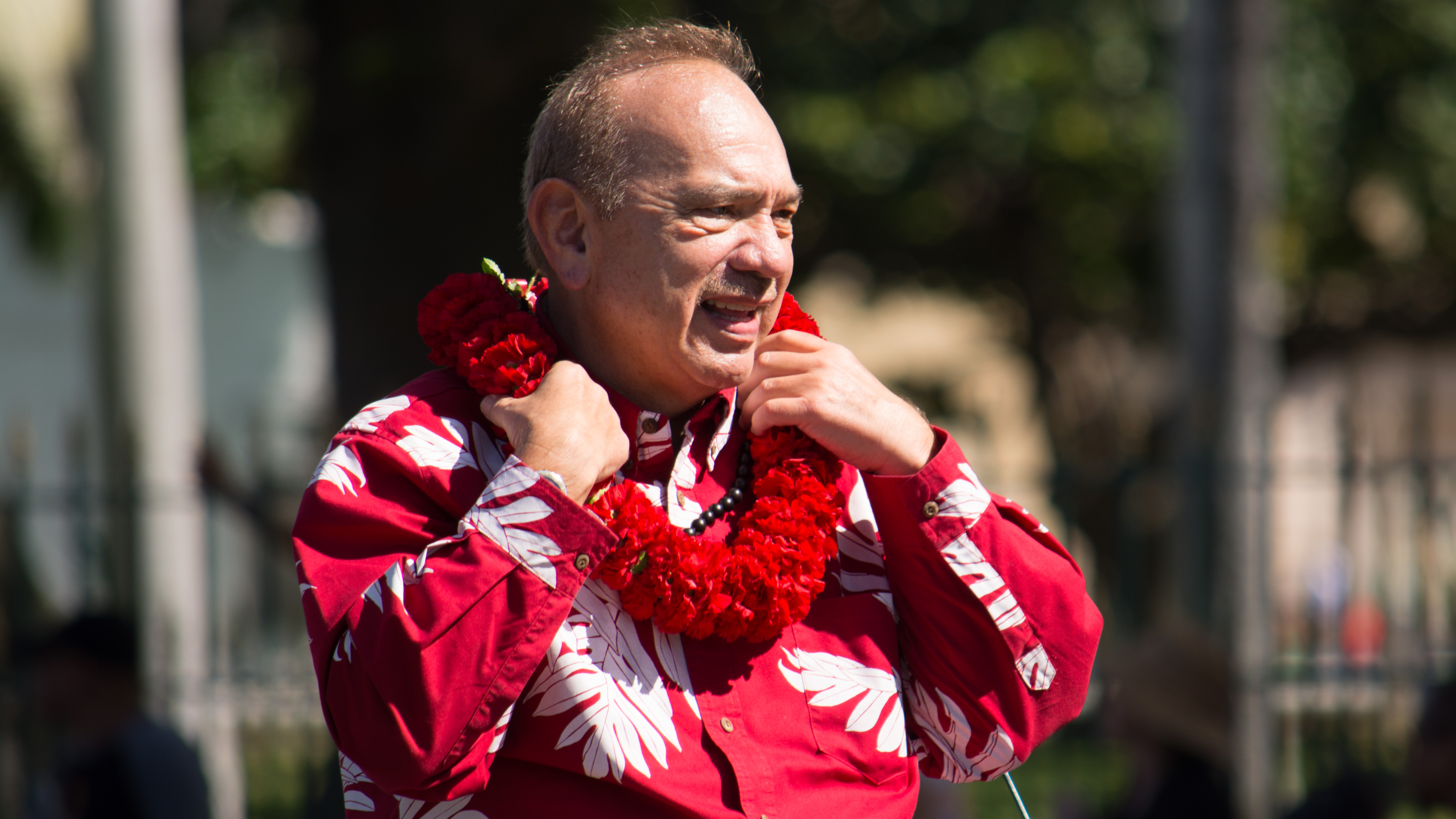
Waiheʻe in June 2016

After leaving the governor's office, Waiheʻe worked for various national-scope law firms based in Washington, DC. He also opened a private law practice and lobbying firm. In two special elections held in November 2002 and January 2003, Waiheʻe considered running for the United States House of Representatives seat left open by the death of Patsy Mink on September 28, 2002. Under Hawaiian election law, it was too late to remove the name of Patsy Mink from the November 2002 general election ballot, and consequently Mink was posthumously re-elected. Waiheʻe dropped out of both special election contests and endorsed the candidacy of Mink's widower.

== See also ==
- List of first minority male lawyers and judges in Hawaii
- List of minority governors and lieutenant governors in the United States

Party political offices
Preceded by Jean King	Democratic nominee for Lieutenant Governor of Hawaii; 1982	Succeeded by Ben Cayetano
Preceded by George Ariyoshi	Democratic nominee for Governor of Hawaii; 1986, 1990	Succeeded by Ben Cayetano
Preceded by Roy Romer	Chair of the Democratic Governors Association; 1991–1992	Succeeded by David Walters
Political offices
Preceded by Jean King	Lieutenant Governor of Hawaii; 1982–1986	Succeeded by Ben Cayetano
Preceded by George Ariyoshi	Governor of Hawaii; 1986–1994	Succeeded by Ben Cayetano
U.S. order of precedence (ceremonial)
Preceded by Martha McSally as Former U.S. Senator	Order of precedence of the United States; Within Hawaii	Succeeded by Ben Cayetano as Former Governor
Preceded by Bill Walker as Former Governor	Order of precedence of the United States; Outside Hawaii	Succeeded by Ben Cayetano as Former Governor
