= Thomas Gill (politician) =

American politician (1922–2009)

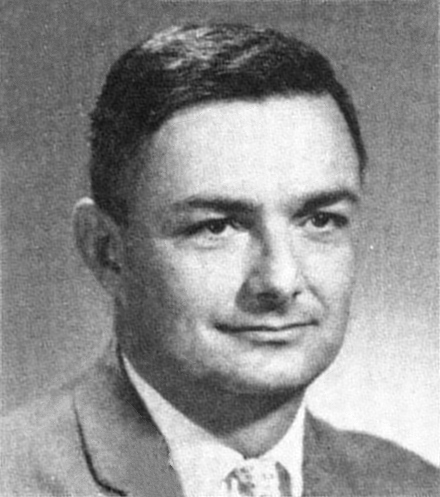

4th Lieutenant Governor of Hawaii
- In office December 2, 1966 – December 2, 1970
- Governor: John A. Burns
- Preceded by: Andrew T. F. Ing
- Succeeded by: George Ariyoshi

Member of the U.S. House of Representatives from Hawaii's at-large district
- In office January 3, 1963 – January 3, 1965
- Preceded by: Daniel Inouye
- Succeeded by: Patsy Mink

Personal details
- Born: Thomas Ponce Gill; April 21, 1922 Honolulu, Hawaii Territory, U.S.
- Died: June 3, 2009 (aged 87) Honolulu, Hawaii, U.S.
- Resting place: National Memorial Cemetery of the Pacific
- Party: Democratic
- Spouse: Lois Hanawalt
- Children: 6, including Gary
- Education: University of Hawaii, Manoa (attended); University of California, Berkeley (BA, LLB)

Military service
- Allegiance: United States
- Branch/service: United States Army
- Years of service: 1942–1945
- Rank: Technical Sergeant
- Unit: Hawaii Territorial Guard; 24th Infantry
- Battles/wars: New Guinea Campaign; Philippines Campaign
- Awards: Bronze Star; Purple Heart

Thomas Ponce Gill (April 21, 1922 – June 3, 2009) was a Hawaii politician. A member of the Democratic party, he served in the United States Congress from 1963 to 1965 and was the fourth lieutenant governor of Hawaii from 1966 to 1970. He unsuccessfully ran for governor twice, in 1970 and 1974.

== Early life ==
Born in Honolulu, Hawaii, Gill attended public schools (Lincoln Elementary and Roosevelt High School). He was a decorated infantryman in the Pacific Theatre during World War II, earning a Bronze Star and a Purple Heart.

After the war, he attended law school at Boalt Hall at UC-Berkeley and began practicing law in Hawaii.

== Career ==
Gill served in Hawaii's territorial legislature and, after statehood in 1959, became a member of the first state house delegation, representing the 15th district until his time in Congress. He was elected to one of his state's two Congressional seats in 1962 and served one term. In Congress, he was a staunch supporter of liberal causes, including civil rights. He then worked as the director of Hawaii's Office of Economic Opportunity. In 1964, Gill chose not to seek reelection and instead ran unsuccessfully for U.S. Senator, losing to Republican incumbent Hiram Fong. In 1966, he was elected Lieutenant Governor with incumbent Governor John A. Burns.

During his term as Lieutenant Governor, Gill, considered outspoken and acerbic, developed differences with Burns, and was never shy about criticizing the incumbent, despite being part of his administration. In 1970, Gill challenged Burns in the Democratic primary. Gill ran as a reformer, campaigning against what he described as an entrenched, corrupt political machine. He narrowly lost, even though Burns significantly outspent him in a savvy campaign that included sophisticated use of expensive image-building television spots. Most in the state's large Japanese population remained loyal to Burns, who had spearheaded their rise to political power during the 1950s. Before Governor Neil Abercrombie lost in 2014 this race stood as the closest anyone came to a primary defeat of an incumbent governor of Hawaii. Gill ran in the primary for governor again in 1974, but lost again in the primary to George Ariyoshi, who had succeeded him as lieutenant governor. After failing both campaigns, he resumed his career as a lawyer.

== Papers ==
Thomas P. Gill donated 86 record center boxes of material to the University of Hawaii at Manoa Library in May 2001. The bulk of the papers cover Gill's two years in Congress and four years in the Hawaii Lt. Governor's office. The collection is rich in material documenting his enthusiastic political life and his concerns about nuclear power; the environment; land development, especially on the Big Island of Hawaii; social and economic justice; and the high cost of living in Hawaii. There is a smaller amount of material from his pre- and post-Congressional life.

The papers are arranged in five series: Political Offices (held by Gill), 1955–1970; Politics (Democratic Party, Hawaii and National), 1952–1972; Personal (election campaigns and biographical material), 1939–2001; Memorabilia (mostly election campaigns), 1940–2005 and bulk 1958–1980; Audiovisual (audiotapes, films, photographs; primarily election campaigns and Big Island development), 1958–1974.

The papers were arranged and described from July 2005 through March 2006 by archivist Ellen Chapman, and are available to researchers in the Library's Archives & Manuscripts Department by appointment. A Finding Aid, which provides a timeline, series descriptions, and list of specific topics covered in the collection is available at The Thomas P. Gill Papers web site.

== Personal life ==
Gill was the son of Thomas Gill (born in New York in 1870) and Lorin Johnston Tarr (born in Kansas in 1889), and the grandson of Dr. Charles Robert Gill (born in New York in 1821) and María Dolores Ponce de León (born in Cuba in 1834 to Cuban parents). His brother was Lorin Tarr Gill, founder of the Hawaii Chapter of the Sierra Club.

Gill married Lois Hanawalt in 1947 and had six children, including three sons who have been involved in Hawaii politics. His son Gary served on the Honolulu City Council, his son Tony is a labor lawyer who considered seeking the governorship in 2006, and his son Eric serves as an elected officer of UNITE HERE Local 5, representing workers at hotels and Kaiser Permanente.

Gill died in 2009 in Honolulu, aged 87.

== See also ==
- List of minority governors and lieutenant governors in the United States
- List of Hispanic and Latino Americans in the United States Congress

U.S. House of Representatives
Preceded by Daniel Inouye	Member of the U.S. House of Representatives from Hawaii's at-large congressional district 1963–1965	Succeeded by Patsy Mink
Party political offices
Preceded by Frank Fasi	Democratic nominee for U.S. Senator from Hawaii (Class 1); 1964	Succeeded by Cecil Heftel
Preceded by William S. Richardson	Democratic nominee for Lieutenant Governor of Hawaii; 1966	Succeeded by George Ariyoshi
Political offices
Preceded by Andrew T. F. Ing	Lieutenant Governor of Hawaii; 1966–1970	Succeeded by George Ariyoshi
