= Jean King =

American politician (1925–2013)

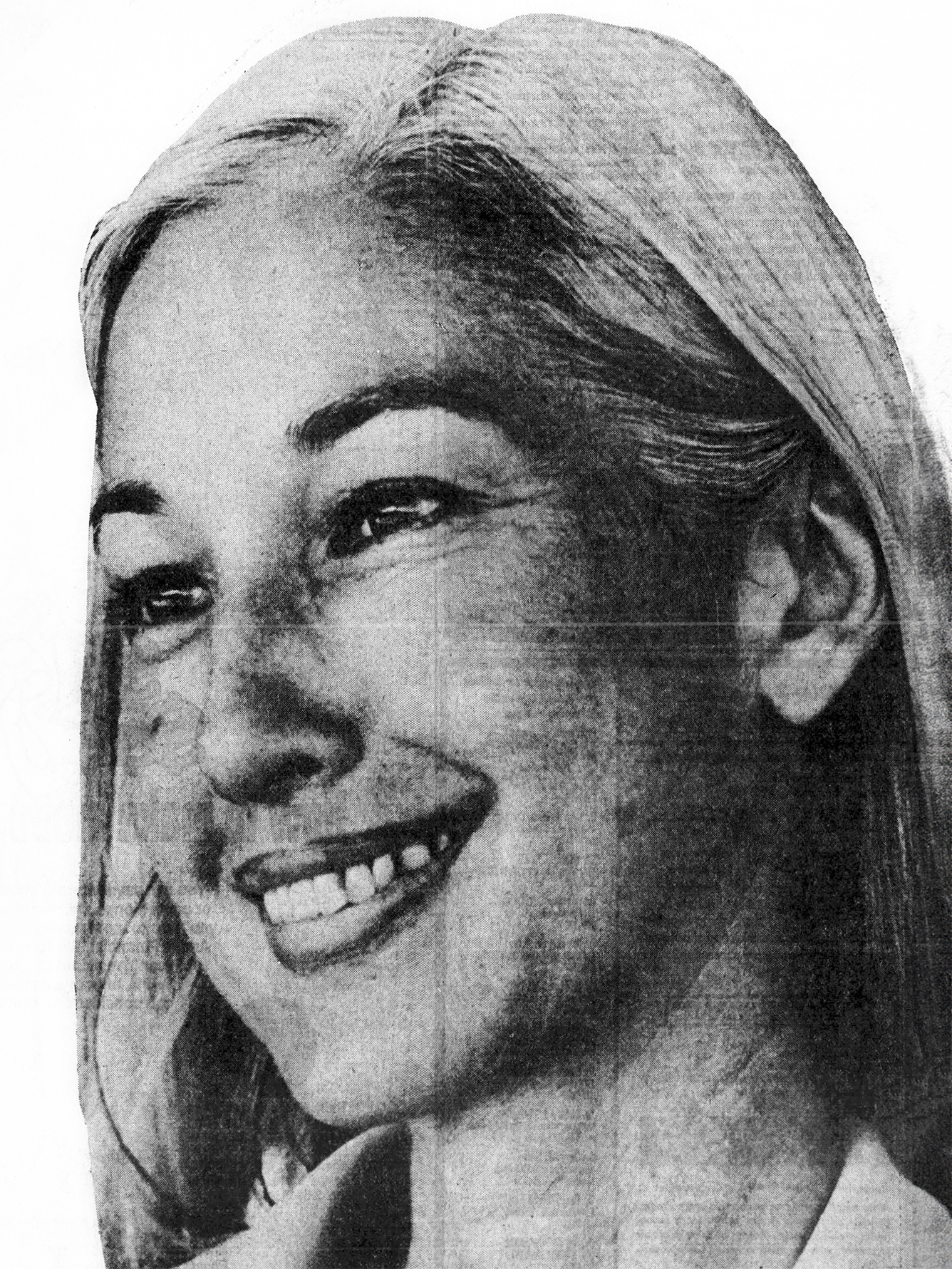
- King in 1978

7th Lieutenant Governor of Hawaii
- In office December 2, 1978 – December 2, 1982
- Governor: George Ariyoshi
- Preceded by: Nelson Doi
- Succeeded by: John D. Waiheʻe III

Member of the Hawaii Senate
- In office 1974–1978

Member of the Hawaii House of Representatives
- In office 1972–1974

Personal details
- Born: Jean Sadako McKillop; December 6, 1925 Honolulu, Territory of Hawaii, U.S.
- Died: November 24, 2013 (aged 87) Honolulu, Hawaii, U.S.
- Party: Democratic
- Spouse: James Aldrich King
- Children: 2

Jean Sadako King (née McKillop; born December 6, 1925 – November 24, 2013) was the seventh lieutenant governor of Hawaii, the state's first woman to be elected as such, from 1978 to 1982 in the administration of Governor George Ariyoshi.

== Family ==
Jean Sadako King was the daughter of William Donald McKillop and Chiyo Murakami McKillop. They married in the early 1920s. Her father, William Donald McKillop, was a postmaster of Scottish descent, whereas her mother, Chiyo Murakami Mckillop, was Japanese. Chiyo came from a family of coffee farmers in Kona. King's parents' interracial relationship was not common during that era. The couple settled in an area near Piikoi and Beretania in Honolulu, where King was born and raised. Later, King married James A. King and had a son and a daughter.

== Education ==
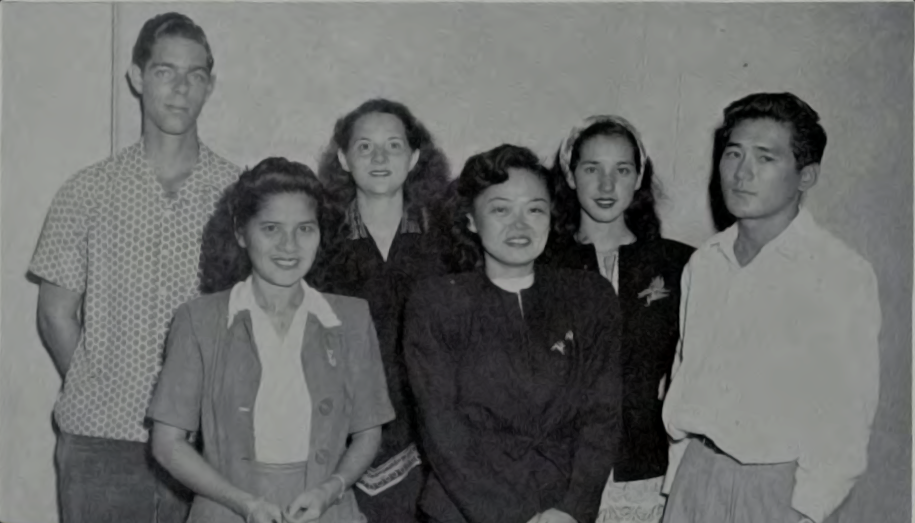
University of Hawaiʻi Oratorical Contest Winners 1948 – L-R: front, Esther Belarmino, 3rd place; Patsy Takemoto, 1st place; Eichi Oki, finalist; back, Barry Rubin, finalist; Alice Mayo, finalist; and Jean McKillop, 2nd place

King moved around throughout her years in primary school, having attended Likelike School, Aliiolani School, and the English Standard School. During her years in high school, she graduated as valedictorian at the Sacred Hearts Academy. King participated in various after-school activities while attending the Sacred Hearts Academy and was involved in Japanese dancing, tap, hula, and typing and shorthand lessons.

For her years in college, King was enrolled in the University of Hawaiʻi, graduating with a Bachelor of Arts in English by 1948. As an undergraduate student, she worked as a class assistant in a psychology lab, tutored English for a sports team, and served as a class officer. She was the co-editor for Ka Leo, which was the school newspaper in the University of Hawaii. Aside from King's academic strides, she won two pageants, taking the crown for Ka Palalpala Cosmopolitan Beauty Queen and Relay Rainbow Queen. After obtaining her Bachelor of Arts, King went for an Master of Arts in history at New York University. Then years later, King went back to the University of Hawaiʻi for another master's. By 1968, King obtained her Master of Fine Arts in theatre and drama. Her second master's thesis was putting together a production for a play, and she chose to base it on a play by Miyamato Ken about the Japanese anti-war.

== Political career ==
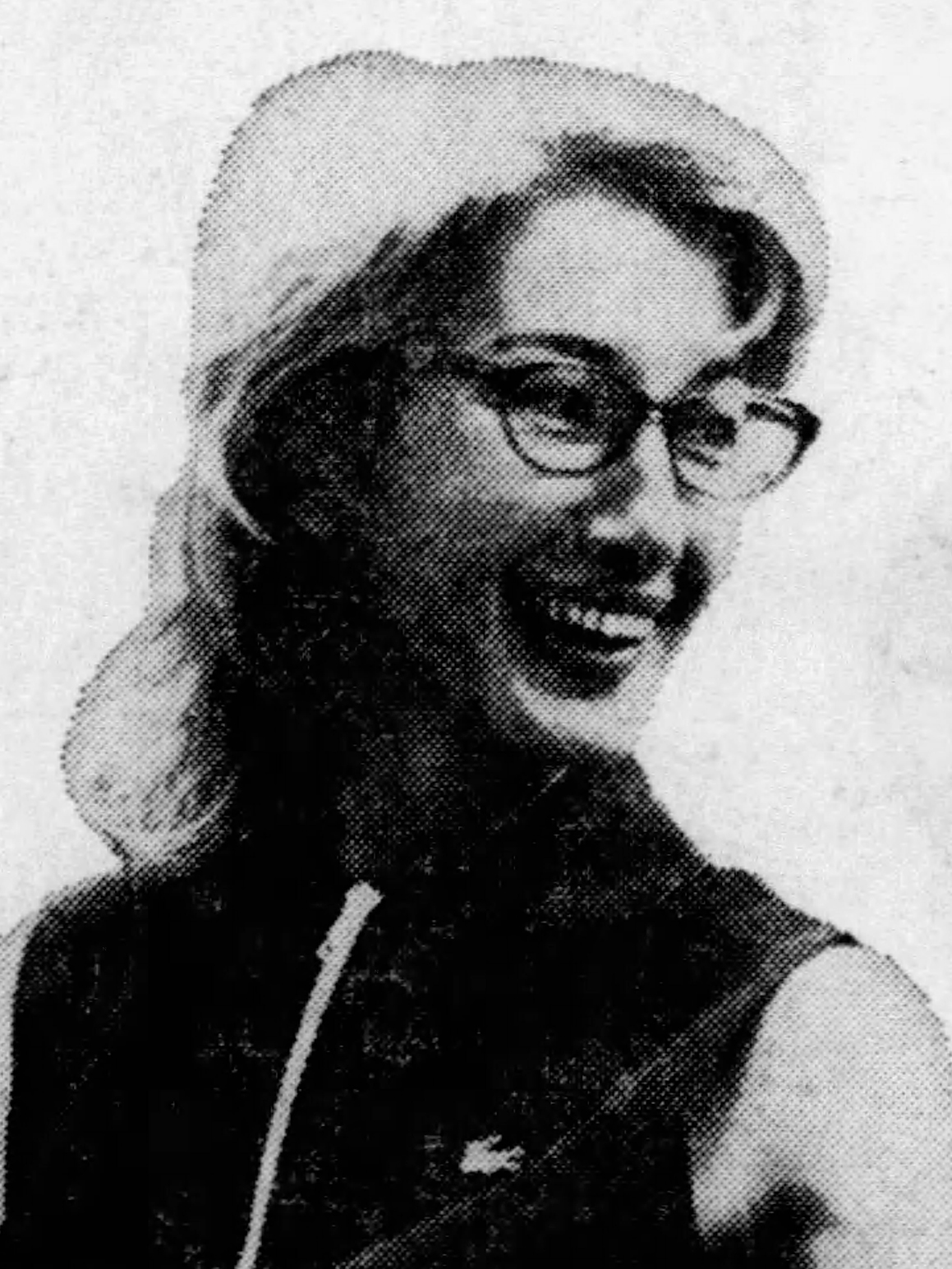
King in 1972 while running for Hawaii House of Representatives.

=== Hawaii State Legislature ===
Before King served in the Hawaii House of Representatives from 1972 to 1974 and the Hawaii Senate from 1974 to 1978, she was a candidate in the Hawaiʻi Constitutional Convention of 1950. King's parents supported the Republican Party, but King wanted to push for more people to join the Democratic Party. She felt that the philosophy of the Democratic Party would be of more interest in Hawaii's population of diverse ethnic backgrounds. While strongly encouraging the public to be more involved with the politics, King was able to pass laws that allowed the public to attend the meetings of government officials.

=== Lieutenant Governor of Hawaii (1978–1982) ===
In 1978, King pursued the position of Lieutenant Governor of Hawaiʻi after Nelson Doi left the office to run for Mayor of Honolulu. King won the election and served with Governor George Ariyoshi in his second term from 1978 to 1982.

=== 1982 Hawaii gubernatorial campaign ===
After one term as Lieutenant Governor, King challenged Ariyoshi in the 1982 Democratic primary election for Governor. She lost with 105,969 votes to 127,906 votes for Ariyoshi, or 44.6 percent to 53.3 percent. After the election, King chose to retire from electoral politics.

== Death and legacy ==
According to her granddaughter, King died at age 87 from pancreatic cancer on November 24, 2013. With the effort and strides that King made, she had been an influence for more women to run for political positions in Hawaii. Senator Mazie Hirono was one of the women who admired King and remembered her with "As the first person elected to the office of lieutenant governor, Jean helped paved the way for women, such as myself." Colleen Hanabusa recognized King as a female role model. In March 2016, Hawaiʻi Magazine ranked King in a list of the most influential women in Hawaiian history.

== See also ==
- List of female lieutenant governors in the United States
- List of minority governors and lieutenant governors in the United States

Party political offices
Preceded by Nelson Doi	Democratic nominee for Lieutenant Governor of Hawaii; 1978	Succeeded by John D. Waiheʻe III
Political offices
Preceded by Nelson Doi	Lieutenant Governor of Hawaii; 1978 - 1982	Succeeded by John D. Waiheʻe III
