= George Ariyoshi =

Governor of Hawaii from 1974 to 1986

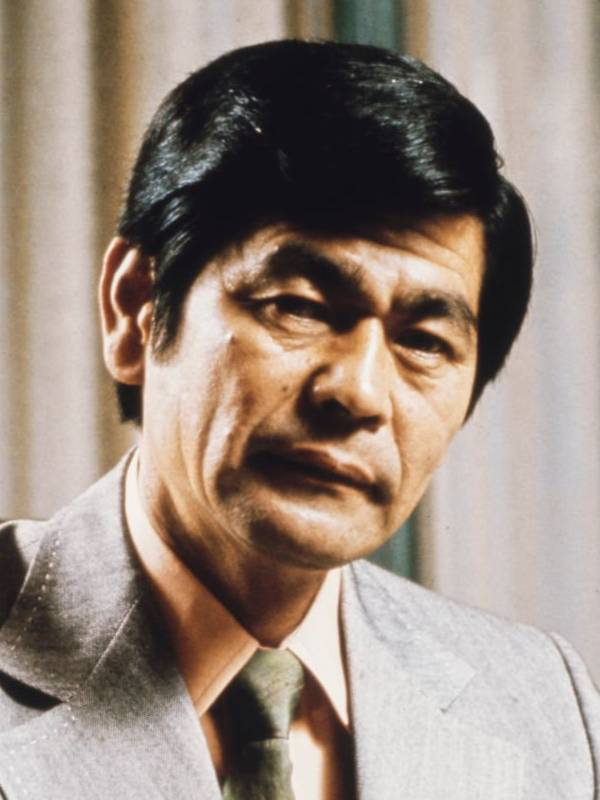
- Ariyoshi in 1974

3rd Governor of Hawaii
- In office October 17, 1973 – December 1, 1986; Acting: October 17, 1973 – December 2, 1974
- Lieutenant: Nelson Doi; Jean King; John Waihee
- Preceded by: John A. Burns
- Succeeded by: John Waihee

5th Lieutenant Governor of Hawaii
- In office December 2, 1970 – December 2, 1974
- Governor: John A. Burns
- Preceded by: Thomas Gill
- Succeeded by: Nelson Doi

Personal details
- Born: George Ryoichi Ariyoshi; March 12, 1926 Honolulu, Hawaii Territory, U.S.
- Died: April 19, 2026 (aged 100) Honolulu, Hawaii, U.S.
- Party: Democratic
- Spouse: Jean Hayashi (m. 1955)
- Children: 3
- Education: University of Hawaii, Manoa (attended); Michigan State University (BA); University of Michigan (JD)
- Civilian awards: Order of the Sacred Treasure (Grand Cordon, Japan)

Military service
- Branch: United States Army
- Unit: Military Intelligence Service
- Conflict: World War II
- Military awards: Nisei Soldiers of World War II Congressional Gold Medal

George Ryoichi Ariyoshi (Japanese: 有吉 良一, romanized: Ariyoshi Ryōichi, March 12, 1926 – April 19, 2026) was an American lawyer and politician who served as the third governor of Hawaii from 1974 to 1986. A Democrat, he was Hawaii's longest-serving governor and the first American of Asian descent to serve as governor of a U.S. state. He assumed gubernatorial powers and duties when Governor John A. Burns was declared incapacitated in October 1973 and was elected in 1974 (assuming governorship December 1974), becoming the first Asian-American to be elected governor of a U.S. state or territory. His lengthy tenure of over 13 years is a record likely to remain unbroken due to term limits enacted after he left office.

== Early life ==
Ariyoshi was born on March 12, 1926, in Honolulu, then in the Territory of Hawaii, to Japanese immigrant parents, who named him after George Washington. Ariyoshi graduated in 1944 from McKinley High School. As World War II drew to a close, he served as an interpreter with the U.S. Army Military Intelligence Service in Japan. Upon returning stateside, he first attended the University of Hawaiʻi at Mānoa, then transferred to Michigan State University, where he graduated with a Bachelor of Arts degree in 1949. He then went on to receive his J.D. degree from the University of Michigan Law School in 1952.

== Early political career ==
Ariyoshi's political career began in 1954 when he was elected to the Hawaii Territorial House of Representatives. He was later elected to the Hawaii Territorial Senate in 1958, then to the Hawaii State Senate in 1959. He served in the senate until 1970 when he ran for and was elected lieutenant governor of Hawaii in 1970 with Governor John A. Burns. When Governor Burns fell ill in October 1973, Ariyoshi assumed his constitutional role as acting governor.

== Governor of Hawaii ==
=== First term ===
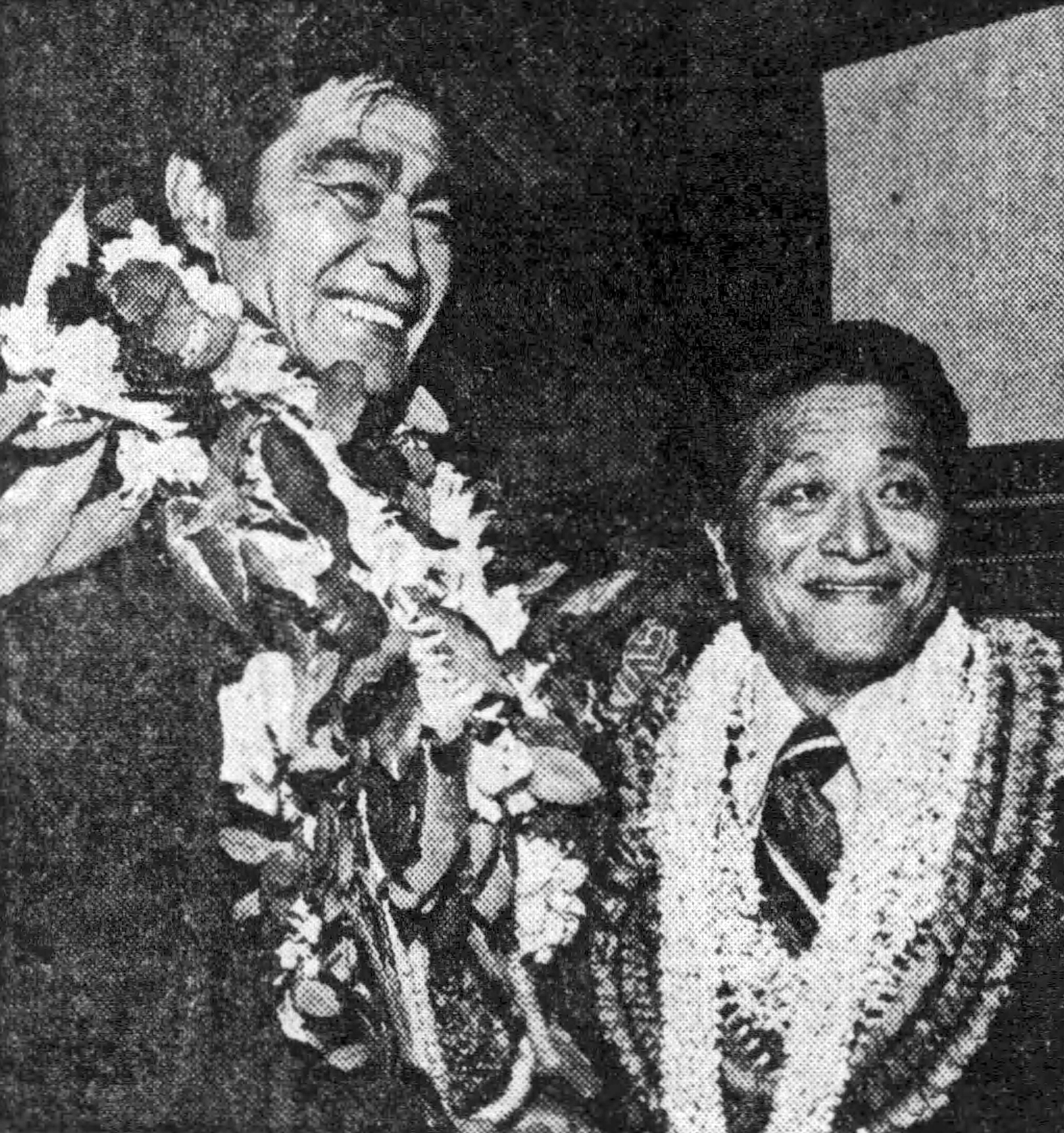
Ariyoshi with his first lieutenant governor Nelson Doi in a 1974 campaign advertisement

In the election of 1974, Ariyoshi was elected governor in his own right, with Nelson Doi as his lieutenant governor. Ariyoshi received 54.6% of the vote against his Republican challenger, former state senator Randolph Crossley with 45.4%.

He guided the state through its first economic recession.

Ariyoshi helped to develop the Kakaako Waterfront during his term amid the development of Downtown Honolulu. In 1976, Ariyoshi created the Hawaii Community Development Authority which established long-term planning for the Kakaako District. The HCDA would identify districts that were underdeveloped and deteriorating while coordinating the future development of these districts.

==== Kukui Plaza corruption case ====
Amid the upcoming 1978 Hawaii Democratic Primary, Ariyoshi was involved in a political feud with Honolulu Mayor and Democratic challenger for the nomination, Frank Fasi, who was involved in a corruption investigation. Around late 1976, Fasi was indicted under suspicions of collecting $500,000 from real-estate developer, Hal J. Hansen, during the development of Kukui Plaza. Hawaii Attorney General, Ron Amemiya, who was appointed by Ariyoshi, was unable to push the case further as Hansen refused to testify as a witness for the prosecution.

Fasi claimed that the investigation was an attempt by Ariyoshi to discredit his campaign and remove him as a strong challenger for the Democratic nomination; Ariyoshi denied any role in directing the investigation. Ariyoshi would go on to be the Democratic nominee for the 1978 Hawaii gubernatorial election, winning 50.30% against Fasi's 48.91% of the vote in the primary election.

=== Second term ===
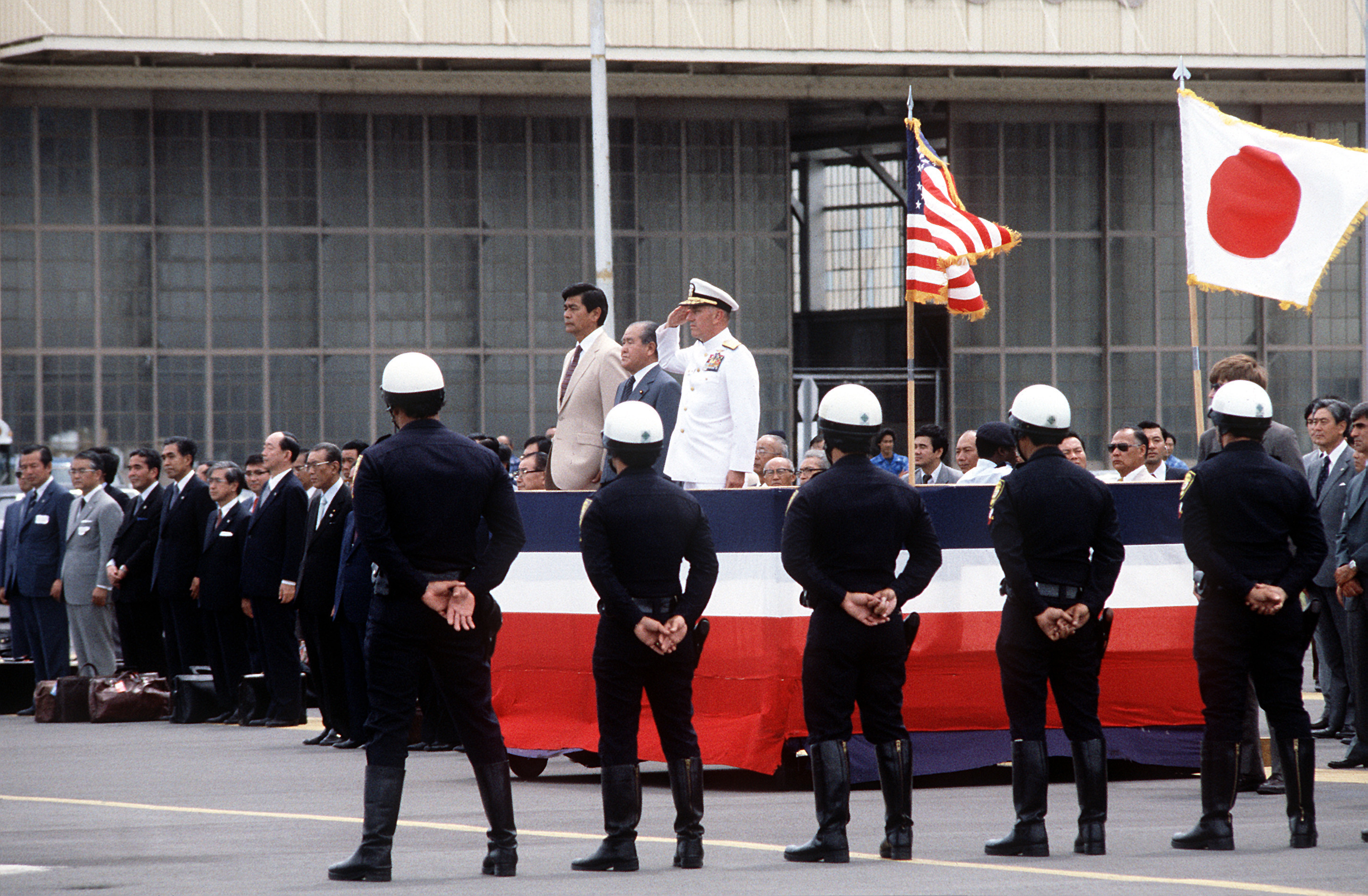
Governor Ariyoshi, Japanese Prime Minister Zenkō Suzuki, and Commander, U.S. Pacific Fleet Admiral Sylvester R. Foley Jr. at a ceremony at Hickam Air Force Base in 1982

In the election of 1978, Ariyoshi was re-elected governor, with Jean King as his lieutenant governor. Ariyoshi received 54.5% of the vote against his Republican challenger, state senator John R. Leopold with 44.3%.

==== Overpopulation concerns ====
Ariyoshi was involved in combatting the over-development and overpopulation of the state. In January 1977, Ariyoshi commented on overpopulation concerns during his State of the State address amid reports from the Temporary Commission on Population Stabilization which stated an inverse relationship between population growth and environmental stewardship. With support from the state legislature, a measure to address overpopulation was to combat in-migration from the mainland. Legislation enacted in 1977 instituted a one year residency requirement for public sector employment, although the law was struck down by a federal judge.

=== Third term ===
In the election of 1982, Ariyoshi was re-elected governor, with John D. Waihee III as his lieutenant governor. Ariyoshi received 45.2% of the vote against a split vote between Independent Democrat Frank Fasi with 28.6% and Republican Dominis Garrida Anderson with 26.1%.

==== International diplomacy ====
Ariyoshi was involved in improving relations with multiple countries with significant presence in Hawaii’s population or history. Around 1982, Ariyoshi visited the Azores in Portugal and established a formal relationship that recognized Hawaii and the Azores as sister-states based on the historic Portuguese immigration from the islands to Hawaii during the plantation-era. Ariyoshi went on to visit multiple countries in similar efforts in 1985 to recognize the relationship between Hawaii and other countries. He set into motion a sister-state relationship between Hawaii and Okinawa, Japan.

Ariyoshi's administration was marked by fiscal conservatism as the post-statehood economic boom came to an end. Barred by term limits from seeking another term in 1986, Ariyoshi was succeeded by Waihee. After leaving public office, he served in a variety of corporate and non-profit capacities.

== Personal life and death ==
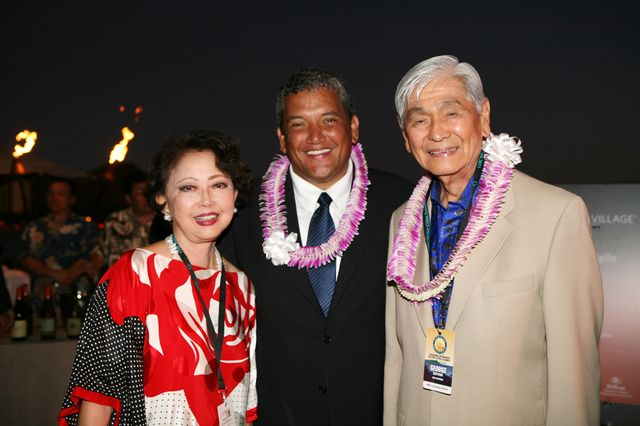
Ariyoshi with Hawaii County Mayor Billy Kenoi and former first lady Jean Ariyoshi in 2011

Ariyoshi married Jean Miya Hayashi in 1955 in Honolulu, Hawaii. They have a daughter, Lynn, born in 1957; and two sons, Ryozo, born in 1959, and Donn, 1961.

In her book Washington Place: A First Lady's Story, Jean Ariyoshi credits former police officer Larry Mehau as becoming responsible for her family's safety. Mehau was also named "Neighbor Islands Coordinator" for her husband's campaign for governor. In the book she states that Mehau, although having a reputation as being honest and tough, was nicknamed in the press as "the Godfather". She does not mention why he was given this nickname, but the press did so because he was accused of having ties to the criminal underworld, with many claiming that he was the top boss of organized crime in Hawaii. According to Jean Ariyoshi, Mehau offered his help but told her husband: "I know I'm controversial, so don't put me up in front." Her husband responded: "I've known you for a long time and I've known you to be a good and honest person. What kind of friend would I be if I said 'I want your help but I don't want anyone to know you're helping me?' I'm not afraid to have people know of our friendship." In his own autobiography, With Obligation to All, George Ariyoshi does not mention Larry Mehau at all.

Ariyoshi also served as president of the Hawaii Bar Association and served on the board of directors for First Hawaiian Bank, the Honolulu Gas Company, and Hawaiian Insurance Guaranty Company. He also served on the board of governors at the East-West Center, based in Honolulu, an internationally known education and research organization that was established by Congress. As governor, he is credited with having revitalized the organization, and joined the board when his term as governor ended. He served five terms as chairman, until he was not reappointed by Republican governor Linda Lingle in 2003.

Ariyoshi died at his Honolulu home on April 19, 2026, at the age of 100.

== See also ==
- List of minority governors and lieutenant governors in the United States

== Sources ==
- Ariyoshi, Wife Detained in Dispute with Customs" (Honolulu Advertiser 05-28-87)
- (resigned from FHB to spare them "any embarrassment")(Honolulu Advertiser 06-19-87)
- (pays $11,389.00 fine)(Honolulu Advertiser 11-28-87)
- https://books.google.com/books/about/Land_and_Power_in_Hawaii.html?id=8128CdCEJNcC

Party political offices
Preceded by Thomas Gill	Democratic nominee for Lieutenant Governor of Hawaii; 1970	Succeeded by Nelson Doi
Preceded by John A. Burns	Democratic nominee for Governor of Hawaii; 1974, 1978, 1982	Succeeded by John Waihee
Political offices
Preceded by Thomas Gill	Lieutenant Governor of Hawaii; 1970–1974	Succeeded by Nelson Doi
Preceded by John A. Burns	Governor of Hawaii; 1973–1986; Acting: 1973–1974	Succeeded by John Waihee
Honorary titles
Preceded by Jimmy Carter	Oldest living American governor 2024–2026	Succeeded by Roy Romer
