= John A. Burns =

Governor of Hawaii from 1962 to 1974

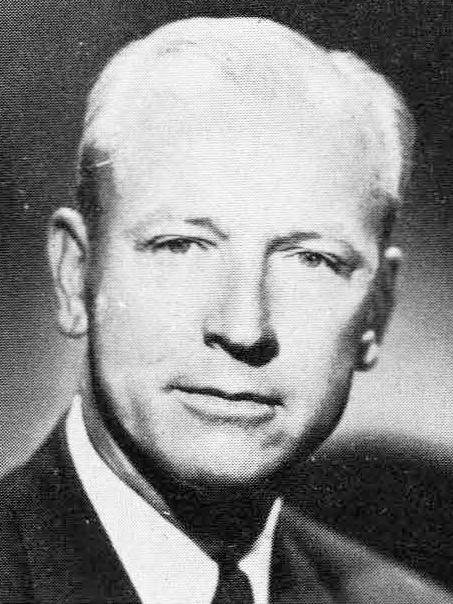

2nd Governor of Hawaii
- In office December 3, 1962 – December 2, 1974; On leave: October 17, 1973 – December 2, 1974
- Lieutenant: William S. Richardson; Andrew T. F. Ing; Thomas Gill; George Ariyoshi
- Preceded by: William F. Quinn
- Succeeded by: George Ariyoshi

Delegate to the U.S. House of Representatives from Hawaii's at-large district
- In office January 3, 1957 – August 21, 1959
- Preceded by: Elizabeth Farrington
- Succeeded by: Daniel Inouye (U.S. Representative)

Personal details
- Born: John Anthony Burns; March 30, 1909 Fort Assinniboine, Montana, U.S.
- Died: April 5, 1975 (aged 66) Honolulu, Hawaii, U.S.
- Resting place: National Memorial Cemetery of the Pacific
- Party: Democratic
- Spouse: Beatrice Van Vleet (m. 1931)
- Children: 3
- Education: University of Hawaii, Manoa (BA)

Military service
- Allegiance: United States
- Branch/service: United States Army
- Years of service: 1927–1928

John Anthony Burns (March 30, 1909 – April 5, 1975) was an American politician. Burns was born in Montana and became a resident of Hawaii in 1913. He served as the second governor of Hawaii from 1962 to 1974.

== Early life ==
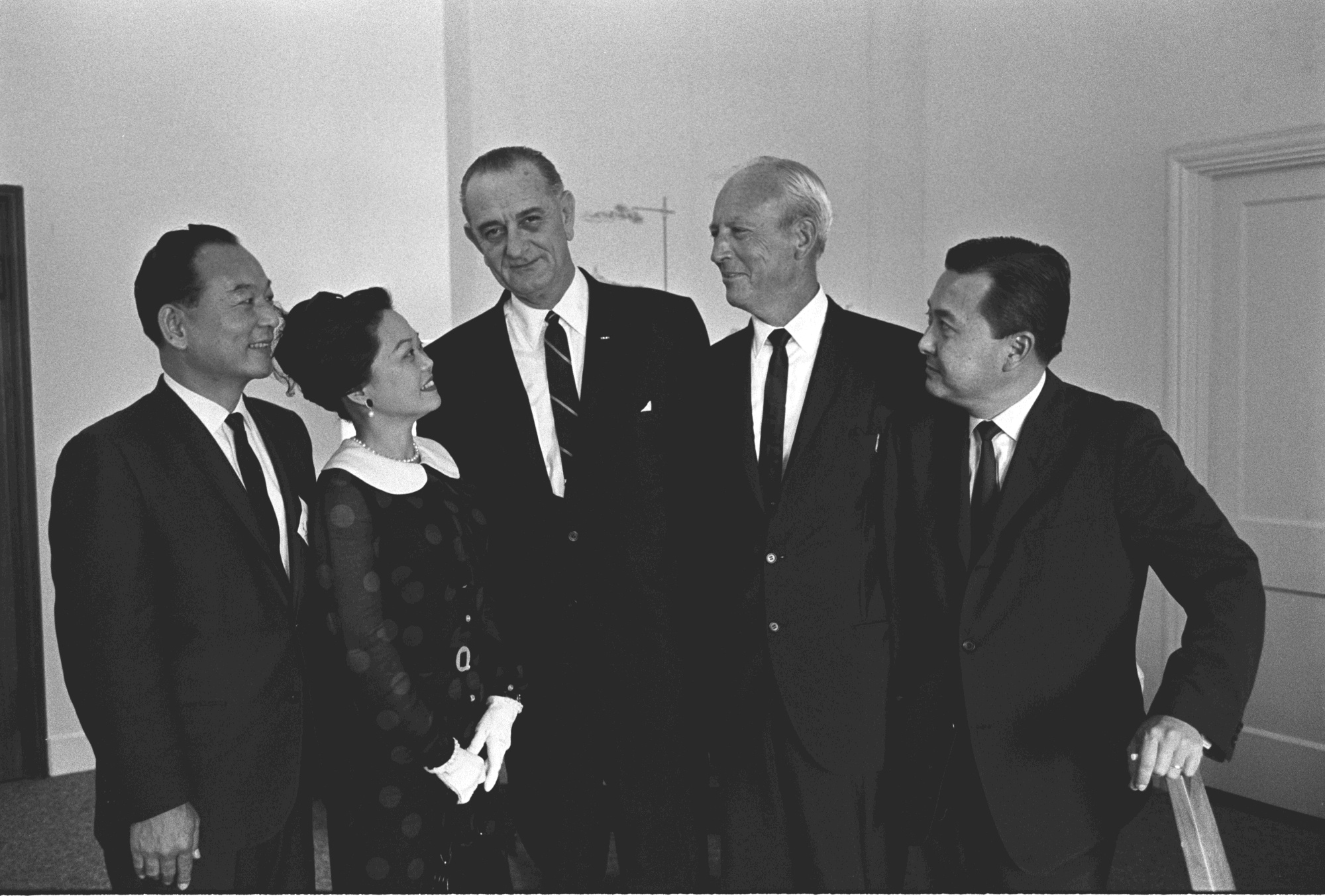
Hawaii Representatives Spark Matsunaga and Patsy Mink, President Lyndon Johnson, Gov. John Burns, and Hawaii Senator Daniel Inouye in 1966.

John Burns was born in Fort Assinniboine, Montana, on March 30, 1909. He was the eldest son of Anne and Harry Burns. Christened Harry John Burns, as a teenager he changed his name to John Anthony Burns.

Burns's father was in the army and was ordered to Fort Shafter in Hawaii, so in 1913 he and his family moved to Hawaii, and eventually to Kalihi. Harry Burns became overwhelmed with responsibility for four children and left the family in 1919. Burns's mother became a launderer for Tripler Army Medical Center. Burns took care of his siblings and attended Saint Louis School, while his mother worked. She joined the Postal Service, and with the help of her brother, became postmaster for Fort Shafter and a clerk at the Honolulu Post office. In 1925, Anne sent John to live with her brother in Kansas, where Jack Scally served as a father figure. In Kansas, he attended Immaculata High School in Leavenworth, then transferred to St. Benedict High School (now Maur Hill–Mount Academy) in Atchison.

In 1927, Burns dropped out of high school and joined the army, but did not like taking orders. He was honorably discharged after one year. Burns returned to Hawaii, waiting a semester to attend Saint Louis School, and eventually graduated in 1930.

== Political career ==
Burns's work as a police officer helped him build close ties with working-class people from numerous ethnic groups, notably Japanese and native Hawaiians. While a police officer in Honolulu, his first political efforts arose from his work with the Police Benevolent Society. From 1948 he led the Hawaii Democratic Revolution of 1954, through various leadership positions in the territorial Democratic Party, culminating in being chair of the territorial party in 1952. He is credited with building a coalition for the Democratic Party that included 442nd Regimental Combat Team veterans, ILWU, other organized labor groups, and Japanese Americans to strengthen the party. In 1956, he was elected a party delegate from Hawaii. As a delegate, Burns played a key role in lobbying for Hawaii statehood, a goal that was achieved on March 12, 1959, when the statehood bill was signed by President Dwight D. Eisenhower. He sought to become the first governor of the newly formed state, but lost the election to Territorial Governor William F. Quinn.

=== Governorship ===
Three years later in 1962, Burns won as a liberal Democrat to become governor. Governor Burns played a leading role in stimulating the state economy and attracting foreign tourism and investment. His many achievements include the promotion of Hawaii as a center for oceanography, construction of the new State Capitol building, and expansion of the University of Hawaiʻi, helping to transform it into a first-class university, attracting students and faculty from around the world and early planning for the construction of the Aloha Stadium to host university football and bowl games. Burns supported the construction of an expanded Honolulu International Airport with a new reef-runway and the construction of Interstate H-3.

Additionally, he supported planning for the future by establishing the Hawaii Commission on the Year 2000, which ultimately led to the development of the Quality Growth Policy for the State of Hawaii. Both the Commission on the Year 2000 and Hawaii's Quality Growth Policy were intended to supplement Hawaii's State Land-Use Plan. Finally, Governor Burns made Hawaii a leader in environmental management, establishing the Office of Environmental Quality Control, within the Governor's Office, to coordinate state environmental policy and to review environmental impact statements on all major state actions.

Burns was re-elected in 1966 and 1970, each time with a different lieutenant governor as his running mate. In 1966, he was elected governor with Lieutenant Governor Thomas Gill. During his term as lieutenant governor, Gill, considered outspoken and acerbic, developed differences with Burns, and was never shy about criticizing the incumbent, despite being part of his administration. In 1970, Gill challenged Burns in the Democratic primary. Gill ran as a reformer, campaigning against what he described as an entrenched, corrupt political machine. He narrowly lost, even though Burns significantly outspent him in a savvy campaign that included sophisticated use of expensive image-building television spots. Most in the state's large Japanese population remained loyal to Burns, who had spearheaded their rise to political power during the 1950s. Before Neil Abercrombie lost in 2014 this race stood as the closest anyone came to a primary defeat of an incumbent governor of Hawaii. Burns's running-mate in 1970, George Ariyoshi, ran to succeed Burns as governor in 1974, defeating Gill in the Democratic primary.

== Later life and death ==
Burns became ill from cancer to the point of incapacity in October 1973. Burns's third elected lieutenant governor, George Ariyoshi, became acting governor through the end of Burns's third term. Ariyoshi was elected in his own right as governor for the term beginning in 1974. Burns died on April 5, 1975, in Honolulu.

== Legacy ==
The John A. Burns School of Medicine, at the University of Hawaiʻi at Mānoa, is named for him. In 1997, Governor Ben Cayetano named the newly completed Interstate H-3 in his honor, and the road to the summit of Mauna Kea is also named after him. A Hawaii golf tournament, comprising the state's best amateurs and PGA professionals, was created in his honor. The Governor's Cup is a team event, and is played between the amateurs against the professionals. A special qualifier for the amateur team after the tournament will provide the medalist a chance to play in the Sony Open in Hawaii, a PGA Tour Event.

U.S. House of Representatives
Preceded by Elizabeth Farrington	Delegate to the U.S. House of Representatives from Hawaii Territory's at-large congressional district 1957–1959	Succeeded by Daniel Inouye; U.S. Representative
Party political offices
First	Democratic nominee for Governor of Hawaii; 1959, 1962, 1966, 1970	Succeeded by George Ariyoshi
Political offices
Preceded by William F. Quinn	Governor of Hawaii; 1962–1974; On leave: 1973–1974	Succeeded by George Ariyoshi
