= Lieutenant Governor of Hawaii =

Assistant chief executive of the U.S. state of Hawaii

- Hawaiian: Ka Hope Kiaʻāina o Hawaiʻi

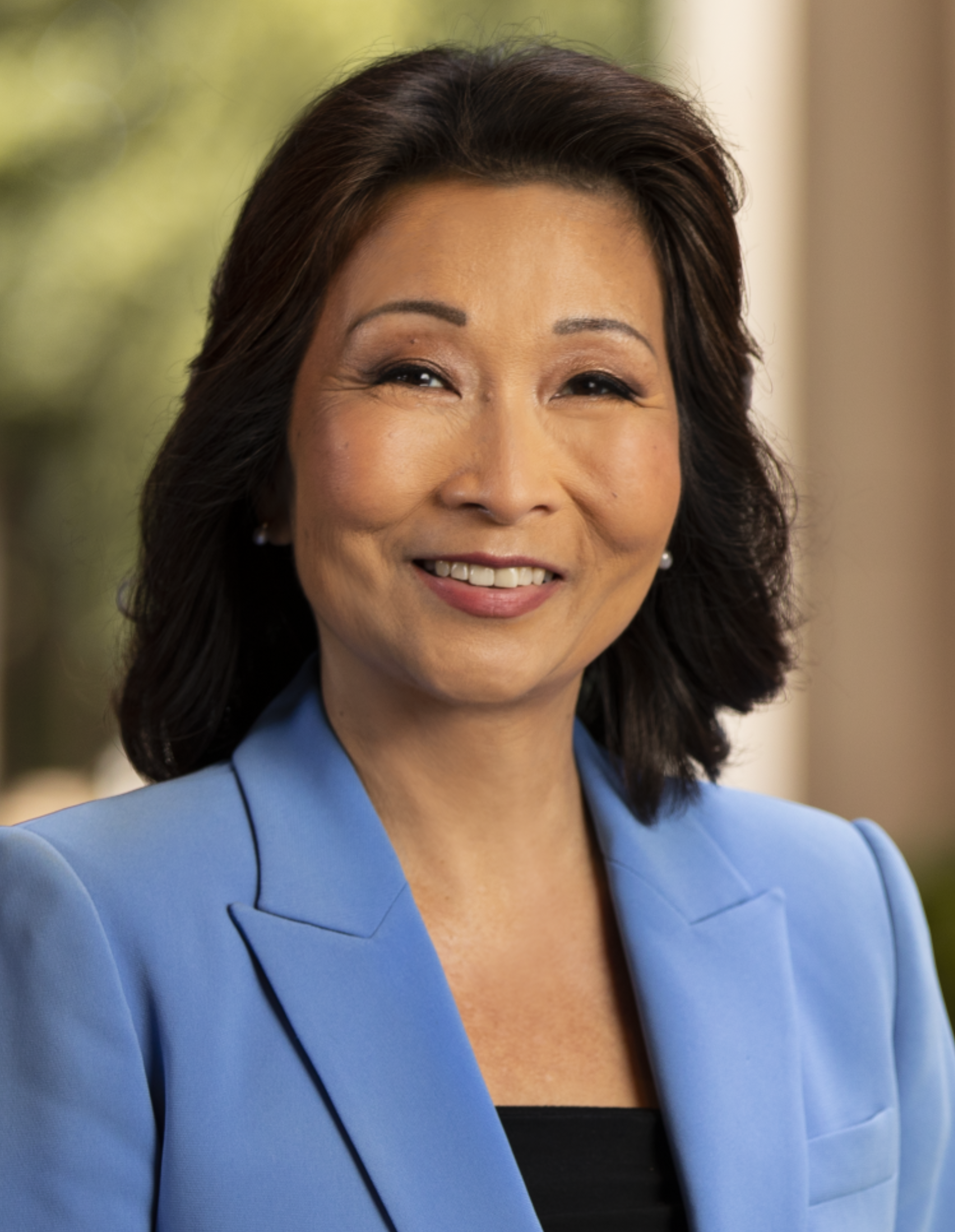
- Incumbent; Sylvia Luke (on leave) since December 5, 2022; Keith Regan (acting since April 23, 2026)
- Government of Hawaii
- Term length: Four years, renewable once consecutively
- Inaugural holder: James Kealoha
- Formation: August 21, 1959 (67 years ago)
- Succession: First
- Salary: $183,804
- Website: Office of the Lt. Governor

The lieutenant governor of Hawaii (Hawaiian: Ka Hope Kiaʻāina o Hawaiʻi) is the assistant chief executive of the U.S. state of Hawaii and its various agencies and departments, as provided in the Article V, Sections 2 though 6 of the Constitution of Hawaii. Elected by popular suffrage of residents of the state on the same ticket as the governor of Hawaii, the officeholder is concurrently the secretary of State of Hawaii.

The officeholder becomes acting governor of Hawaii if the governor becomes disabled from duty. Historically, Hawaii lieutenant governors were members of either the Hawaii Democratic Party or Hawaii Republican Party. Four have gone on to become governor of Hawaii: George Ariyoshi, Ben Cayetano, John D. Waiheʻe III, and Josh Green.

== Qualifications ==
The lieutenant governor of Hawaiʻi is limited to two four-year terms. Inauguration takes place on the first Monday in December following a gubernatorial election. A single term ends at noon four years later. The lieutenant governor must be thirty years old and be a resident of Hawaiʻi for five consecutive years previous to election. Unlike some other states, the office of Lieutenant Governor of Hawaii is a full-time position and requires that the lieutenant governor be barred from other professions or paid positions during the term.

== List of lieutenant governors ==
Parties

Democratic (14) Republican (2)

#	Image	Name	Start	End	Party	Governor(s)
1		James Kealoha	August 21, 1959	December 2, 1962	Republican	William F. Quinn
2		William S. Richardson	December 2, 1962	April 13, 1966	Democratic	John A. Burns
3		Andrew T. F. Ing	April 13, 1966	December 2, 1966	Democratic	John A. Burns
4		Thomas Gill	December 2, 1966	December 2, 1970	Democratic	John A. Burns
5		George Ariyoshi	December 2, 1970	December 2, 1974	Democratic	John A. Burns
6		Nelson Doi	December 2, 1974	December 2, 1978	Democratic	George Ariyoshi
7		Jean King	December 2, 1978	December 2, 1982	Democratic	George Ariyoshi
8		John D. Waiheʻe	December 2, 1982	December 2, 1986	Democratic	George Ariyoshi
9		Ben Cayetano	December 2, 1986	December 2, 1994	Democratic	John D. Waiheʻe
10		Mazie Hirono	December 2, 1994	December 2, 2002	Democratic	Ben Cayetano
11		Duke Aiona	December 4, 2002	December 6, 2010	Republican	Linda Lingle
12		Brian Schatz	December 6, 2010	December 26, 2012	Democratic	Neil Abercrombie
13		Shan Tsutsui	December 27, 2012	December 1, 2014	Democratic	Neil Abercrombie
13		Shan Tsutsui	December 1, 2014	January 31, 2018	Democratic	David Ige
14		Doug Chin	February 2, 2018	December 3, 2018	Democratic	David Ige
15		Josh Green	December 3, 2018	December 5, 2022	Democratic	David Ige
16		Sylvia Luke	December 5, 2022	Present; On leave: April 23, 2026 – Present; Acting: Keith Regan	Democratic	Josh Green

== See also ==
- List of Hawaii state legislatures
