= List of governors of Hawaii =

Governors of Hawaii

Governor of Hawaii
- Ke Kiaʻaina o Hawaiʻi
- Gubernatorial standard

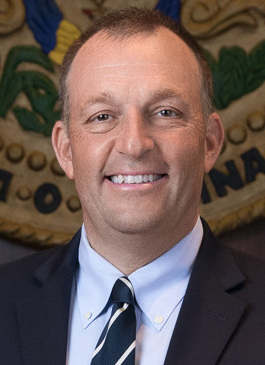
- Incumbent; Josh Green since December 5, 2022
- Residence: Washington Place
- Term length: Four years, renewable once
- Precursor: Governor of Hawaii Territory
- Inaugural holder: William F. Quinn
- Formation: August 21, 1959 (67 years ago)
- Succession: Line of succession
- Deputy: Lieutenant Governor of Hawaii
- Website: governor.hawaii.gov

Flag of the governor

Flag of the governor before statehood in 1959

The governor of Hawaii (Hawaiian: Ke Kiaʻāina o Hawaiʻi) is the head of government of Hawaii, and commander-in-chief of the state's military forces.

Of the eight governors of the state, two have been elected to three terms, four have been elected to two terms, and one has been elected to one term. No state governor has yet resigned or died in office, nor did any territorial governor die in office. George Ariyoshi was the first Asian American to be governor of any U.S. state. The current governor is Democrat Josh Green, who took office on December 5, 2022.

The longest-serving governors are John A. Burns (1962–1974) and George Ariyoshi (1974–1986), both of whom served 12 years each.

== List of governors ==
The Republic of Hawaii was annexed by the United States in 1898. It was organized into Hawaii Territory in 1900, and admitted as a state in 1959. The Republic had only one president, Sanford B. Dole, who later was the first territorial governor.

=== Hawaii Territory ===
Hawaii Territory was organized on June 14, 1900, remaining a territory for 59 years. Twelve people served as territorial governor, appointed by the president of the United States.

Governors of the Territory of Hawaii
No.	Governor	Term in office	Appointed by
1	Sanford B. Dole (1844–1926)	June 14, 1900 (Note: Dole was nominated on May 4, 1900, confirmed by the Senate on May 9, and took office on June 14.) – November 23, 1903 (1258 days; resigned) (Note: Dole resigned, having been confirmed to the United States District Court for Hawaii Territory.)	William McKinley
2	George R. Carter (1866–1933)	November 23, 1903 (Note: Carter was appointed on October 31, 1903, during a Senate recess; nominated on November 11; confirmed by the Senate on November 23; and took office the same day.) – August 15, 1907 (1362 days; resigned) (Note: Carter's term was to have ended November 23, 1907, but he had stated he did not wish to serve again, so his successor was appointed early.)	Theodore Roosevelt
3	Walter F. Frear (1863–1948)	August 15, 1907 (Note: Frear was appointed on June 28, 1907, during a Senate recess; nominated on December 3; and was confirmed by the Senate on December 18; He took office on August 15.) – December 31, 1913 (2331 days; replaced)	Theodore Roosevelt
4	Lucius E. Pinkham (1850–1922)	December 31, 1913 (Note: Pinkham was nominated on July 24, 1913, and confirmed by the Senate on November 29. He took office on December 31.) – June 22, 1918 (1635 days; replaced)	Woodrow Wilson
5	Charles J. McCarthy (1861–1929)	June 22, 1918 (Note: McCarthy was nominated on April 18, 1918, confirmed by the Senate on May 4, and took office on June 22.) – July 5, 1921 (1110 days; replaced)	Woodrow Wilson
6	Wallace Rider Farrington (1871–1933)	July 5, 1921 (Note: Farrington was nominated on June 2, 1921, confirmed by the Senate on June 17, and took office on July 5. He was reconfirmed by the Senate on February 2, 1925.) – July 5, 1929 (2923 days; replaced)	Warren G. Harding
6	Wallace Rider Farrington (1871–1933)	July 5, 1921 – July 5, 1929 (2923 days; replaced)	Calvin Coolidge
7	Lawrence M. Judd (1887–1968)	July 5, 1929 (Note: Judd was nominated on April 24, 1929, confirmed by the Senate on April 29, and took office on July 5.) – March 1, 1934 (1701 days; replaced)	Herbert Hoover
8	Joseph Poindexter (1869–1951)	March 1, 1934 (Note: Poindexter was nominated on January 30, 1934, confirmed by the Senate on February 5, and took office on March 1.) – August 24, 1942 (3099 days; replaced)	Franklin D. Roosevelt
9	Ingram Stainback (Note: Stainback had little power until October 24, 1944, as his predecessor had declared martial law on December 7, 1941, following the attack on Pearl Harbor, delegating executive authority to the military. During the military rule, the territory was governed by Lieutenant Generals Walter Short, Delos Carleton Emmons, and Robert C. Richardson Jr.) (1883–1961)	August 24, 1942 (Note: Stainback was nominated on July 23, 1942, confirmed by the Senate on July 27, and took office on August 24. He was reconfirmed on July 13, 1946.) – April 30, 1951 (3172 days; resigned) (Note: Stainback resigned due to poor health; he submitted his resignation on February 7, to take effect April 30. Territorial Secretary Long, who would succeed him on May 8, acted as governor in the interim.)	Franklin D. Roosevelt
9	Ingram Stainback (1883–1961)	August 24, 1942 – April 30, 1951 (3172 days; resigned)	Harry S. Truman
10	Oren E. Long (1889–1965)	May 8, 1951 (Note: Long was nominated on April 23, 1951, confirmed by the Senate on May 4, and took office on May 8.) – February 28, 1953 (663 days; replaced)	Harry S. Truman
11	Samuel Wilder King (1886–1959)	February 28, 1953 (Note: King was nominated on February 18, 1953, confirmed by the Senate on February 23, and took office on February 28.) – July 31, 1957 (1615 days; resigned) (Note: King resigned when denied a second term by President Eisenhower, to take effect at the pleasure of the president; the president accepted it on July 31 and named territorial secretary Farrant L. Turner acting governor until a new governor took office.)	Dwight D. Eisenhower
12	William F. Quinn (1919–2006)	September 2, 1957 (Note: Quinn was nominated on August 9, 1957, confirmed by the Senate on August 28, and took office on September 2.) – August 21, 1959 (719 days; elected state governor)	Dwight D. Eisenhower

=== State of Hawaii ===
Hawaii was admitted to the Union on August 21, 1959, consisting of Hawaii Territory minus Palmyra Atoll. Since then, there have been nine governors.

The governor is elected to a four-year term commencing on the first Monday in the December following the election. The lieutenant governor is elected for the same term and, since 1964, on the same ticket as the governor. The 1978 constitutional convention established a term limit of two consecutive terms for both offices. If the office of governor is vacant, the lieutenant governor becomes governor; if the governor is out of the state or unable to fulfill duties, the lieutenant governor acts as governor during such absence or disability.

Governors of the State of Hawaii
No.	Governor	Term in office	Party	Election	Lt. Governor (Note: Lieutenant governors represented the same party as their governor unless noted.)
1	William F. Quinn (1919–2006)	August 21, 1959 – December 3, 1962 (1201 days; lost election)	Republican	1959	James Kealoha
2	John A. Burns (1909–1975)	December 3, 1962 – December 2, 1974 (4383 days; retired)	Democratic	1962	William S. Richardson (resigned April 13, 1966)
2	John A. Burns (1909–1975)	December 3, 1962 – December 2, 1974 (4383 days; retired)	Democratic	1962	Andrew T. F. Ing
2	John A. Burns (1909–1975)	December 3, 1962 – December 2, 1974 (4383 days; retired)	Democratic	1966	Thomas Gill
2	John A. Burns (1909–1975)	December 3, 1962 – December 2, 1974 (4383 days; retired)	Democratic	1970	George Ariyoshi
3	George Ariyoshi (1926–2026)	December 2, 1974 – December 1, 1986 (4383 days; term-limited) (Note: Under the constitution as amended in 1978, governors cannot be elected to more than two consecutive terms.)	Democratic	1974	Nelson Doi
3	George Ariyoshi (1926–2026)	December 2, 1974 – December 1, 1986 (4383 days; term-limited)	Democratic	1978	Jean King
3	George Ariyoshi (1926–2026)	December 2, 1974 – December 1, 1986 (4383 days; term-limited)	Democratic	1982	John D. Waiheʻe III
4	John D. Waiheʻe III (b. 1946)	December 1, 1986 – December 5, 1994 (2927 days; term-limited)	Democratic	1986	Ben Cayetano
4	John D. Waiheʻe III (b. 1946)	December 1, 1986 – December 5, 1994 (2927 days; term-limited)	Democratic	1990	Ben Cayetano
5	Ben Cayetano (b. 1939)	December 5, 1994 – December 2, 2002 (2920 days; term-limited)	Democratic	1994	Mazie Hirono
5	Ben Cayetano (b. 1939)	December 5, 1994 – December 2, 2002 (2920 days; term-limited)	Democratic	1998	Mazie Hirono
6	Linda Lingle (b. 1953)	December 2, 2002 – December 6, 2010 (2927 days; term-limited)	Republican	2002	Duke Aiona
6	Linda Lingle (b. 1953)	December 2, 2002 – December 6, 2010 (2927 days; term-limited)	Republican	2006	Duke Aiona
7	Neil Abercrombie (b. 1938)	December 6, 2010 – December 1, 2014 (1457 days; lost nomination)	Democratic	2010	Brian Schatz (resigned December 26, 2012)
7	Neil Abercrombie (b. 1938)	December 6, 2010 – December 1, 2014 (1457 days; lost nomination)	Democratic	2010	Vacant
7	Neil Abercrombie (b. 1938)	December 6, 2010 – December 1, 2014 (1457 days; lost nomination)	Democratic	2010	Shan Tsutsui (took office December 27, 2012) (resigned January 31, 2018)
8	David Ige (b. 1957)	December 1, 2014 – December 5, 2022 (2927 days; term-limited)	Democratic	2014	Shan Tsutsui (took office December 27, 2012) (resigned January 31, 2018)
8	David Ige (b. 1957)	December 1, 2014 – December 5, 2022 (2927 days; term-limited)	Democratic	2014	Vacant
8	David Ige (b. 1957)	December 1, 2014 – December 5, 2022 (2927 days; term-limited)	Democratic	2014	Doug Chin (took office February 2, 2018)
8	David Ige (b. 1957)	December 1, 2014 – December 5, 2022 (2927 days; term-limited)	Democratic	2018	Josh Green
9	Josh Green (b. 1970)	December 5, 2022 – Incumbent (Note: Green's term will expire on December 7, 2026; he was elected to a second term on November 3, 2026.) (in office 1449 days)	Democratic	2022	Sylvia Luke (on leave from April 23, 2026 to present) (Acting: Keith Regan)
9	Josh Green (b. 1970)	December 5, 2022 – Incumbent (in office 1449 days)	Democratic	2026	Derek Kawakami

== Electoral history ==
Year	Democratic nominee			Republican nominee			Independent candidate			Libertarian nominee			Green nominee			Other candidate			Other candidate		
Year	Candidate	#	%	Candidate	#	%	Candidate	#	%	Candidate	#	%	Candidate	#	%	Candidate	#	%	Candidate	#	%
1959	John A. Burns	82,074	48.66%	William F. Quinn	86,213	51.12%	David Kihei (Commonwealth)	480	0.98%	–			–			–			–		
1962	John A. Burns	114,308	58.32%	William F. Quinn	81,707	41.68%	–			–			–			–			–		
1966	John A. Burns	108,840	51.06%	Randolph Crossley	104,324	48.94%	–			–			–			–			–		
1970	John A. Burns	137,812	57.65%	Samuel P. King	101,249	42.35%	–			–			–			–			–		
1974	George Ariyoshi	136,262	54.58%	Randolph Crossley	113,388	45.42%	–			–			–			–			–		
1978	George Ariyoshi	153,394	54.48%	John R. Leopold	124,610	44.25%	Alema Leota	1,982	0.70%	Gregory Reeser	1,059	0.38%	–			John Moore (Aloha Democratic)	542	0.19%	–		
1982	George Ariyoshi	141,043	45.23%	D. G. Anderson	81,507	26.14%	Frank Fasi	89,303	28.64%	–			–			–			–		
1986	John D. Waiheʻe	173,655	51.98%	D. G. Anderson	160,460	48.02%	–			–			–			–			–		
1990	John D. Waiheʻe	203,491	59.83%	Fred Hemmings	131,310	38.61%	Peggy Ha'o Ross	2,446	0.72%	Don Smith	2,885	0.85%	–			–			–		
1994	Ben Cayetano	134,978	36.58%	Pat Saiki	107,908	29.24%	Frank Fasi (Best)	113,158	30.67%	–			Kioni Dudley	12,969	3.51%	–					
1998	Ben Cayetano	204,206	50.11%	Linda Lingle	198,952	48.82%	–			George Peabody	4,398	1.08%	–			–			–		
2002	Mazie Hirono	179,647	47.01%	Linda Lingle	197,009	51.56%	Jim Brewer	1,147	0.30%	Tracy Ryan	1,364	0.36%	–			Bu La'ia Hill (Natural Law)	2,561	0.67%	Daniel Cunningham (Independent)	382	0.10%
2006	Randy Iwase	121,717	35.35%	Linda Lingle	215,313	62.53%	–			Ozell Daniel	1,850	0.54%	Jim Brewer	5,435	1.58%	–			–		
2010	Neil; Abercrombie	222,724	58.22%	Duke Aiona	157,311	41.12%	Tom Pollard	1,263	0.33%	–			–			Daniel Cunningham (Free Energy)	1,265	0.33%	–		
2014	David Ige	181,106	49.45%	Duke Aiona	135,775	37.08%	Mufi Hannemann	42,934	11.72%	Jeff Davis	6,395	1.75%	–			–			–		
2018	David Ige	244,934	62.67%	Andria Tupola	131,719	33.70%	Terrence Teruya	4,067	1.04%	–			Jim Brewer	10,123	2.59%	–			–		
2022	Josh Green	261,025	63.16%	Duke Aiona	152,237	36.84%	–			–			–			–			–		

== See also ==
- Gubernatorial lines of succession in the United States § Hawaii
- First ladies of Hawaii
- Lieutenant Governor of Hawaii
- List of Hawaiian monarchs
- Governors of the island of Hawaiʻi
- Governors of Maui
- Governors of Oʻahu
- Governors of Kauaʻi
- List of Hawaii state legislatures

== Sources ==
- "Former Hawaii Governors". National Governors Association.
- "Hawaii Constitution". State Democracy Research Initiative. University of Wisconsin Law School.
- Glashan, Roy R. (1979). American Governors and Gubernatorial Elections, 1775-1978. Meckler Books. ISBN 0-7201-1511-6 – via Internet Archive.
- Kallenbach, Joseph E.; Kallenbach, Jessamine S. (1977). American State Governors, 1776-1976. Oceana Publications. ISBN 978-0-379-00665-0 – via Internet Archive.
- McMullin, Thomas A.; Walker, David (1984). Biographical Directory of American Territorial Governors. Meckler Publishing. ISBN 0-930466-11-X – via Internet Archive.
- Mullaney, Marie Marmo (1994). Biographical Directory of the Governors of the United States, 1988–1994. Greenwood Publishing Group. ISBN 0-313-28312-5 – via Internet Archive.
- Sobel, Robert; Raimo, John (1978). Biographical Directory of the Governors of the United States, 1789-1978. Vol. 1. Meckler Books. ISBN 0-930466-01-2 – via Internet Archive.
- Thorpe, Francis Newton, ed. (1909). The Federal and State Constitutions, Colonial Charters, and Other Organic Laws of the States, Territories, and Colonies Now or Heretofore Forming the United States of America. Vol. 7. United States Government Publishing Office – via Internet Archive.
