= Mazie Hirono =

American lawyer and politician (born 1947)

- 広野 慶子
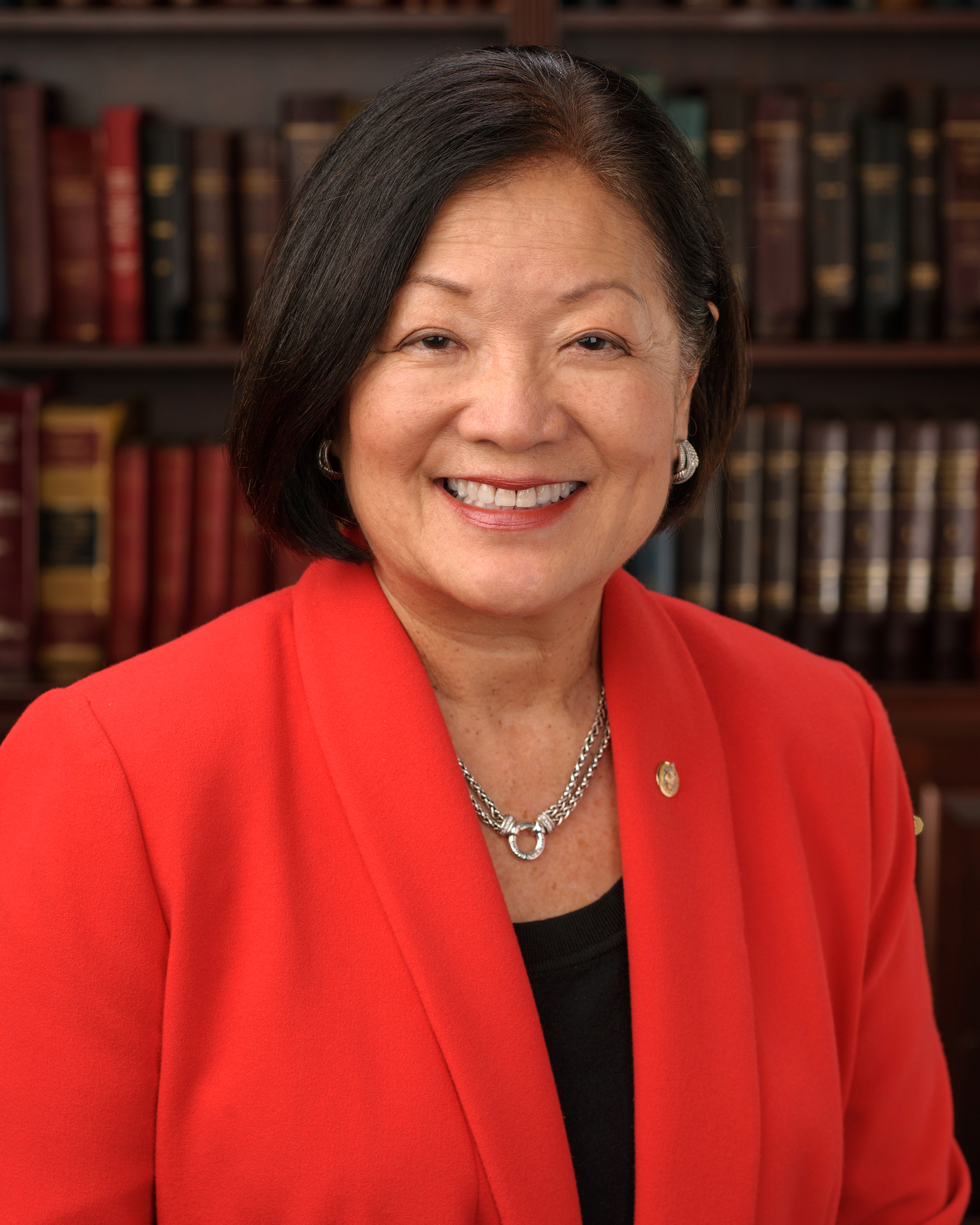
- Official portrait, 2013

United States Senator from Hawaii
- Incumbent
- Assumed office January 3, 2013 Serving with Brian Schatz
- Preceded by: Daniel Akaka

Member of the U.S. House of Representatives from Hawaii's 2nd district
- In office January 3, 2007 – January 3, 2013
- Preceded by: Ed Case
- Succeeded by: Tulsi Gabbard

10th Lieutenant Governor of Hawaii
- In office December 2, 1994 – December 2, 2002
- Governor: Ben Cayetano
- Preceded by: Ben Cayetano
- Succeeded by: Duke Aiona

Member of the Hawaii House of Representatives
- In office January 3, 1981 – December 2, 1994
- Preceded by: Clifford Uwaine; David Hagino
- Succeeded by: Terry Yoshinaga
- Constituency: 12th district (1981–1983); 20th district (1983–1985); 32nd district (1985–1993); 22nd district (1993–1994)

Personal details
- Born: Mazie Keiko Hirono; November 3, 1947 (age 79) Koori, Fukushima, Japan
- Citizenship: Japan (until 1959); United States (since 1959)
- Party: Democratic
- Spouse: Leighton Oshima (m. 1987)
- Education: University of Hawaii, Manoa (BA); Georgetown University (JD)
- Website: Senate website Campaign website
- Hirono's voice Hirono questioning witnesses on Guantanamo Bay detainees. Recorded December 7, 2021

Mazie Keiko Hirono (/ˈmeɪzi hiˈroʊnoʊ/; Japanese name: 広野 慶子, Hirono Keiko; born November 3, 1947) is an American lawyer and politician serving since 2013 as the junior United States senator from Hawaii. A member of the Democratic Party, Hirono previously served as a member of the United States House of Representatives for Hawaii's 2nd congressional district from 2007 to 2013. She has been the dean of Hawaii's congressional delegations since 2013, when Senator Daniel Akaka retired. Hirono also served as a member of the Hawaii House of Representatives from 1981 to 1994 and as Hawaii's tenth lieutenant governor from 1994 to 2002. She was the Democratic nominee for governor of Hawaii in 2002, but lost to Republican Linda Lingle.

Hirono is the first elected female senator from Hawaii, the first Asian-American woman elected to the Senate, the first U.S. senator born in Japan, and the nation's first Buddhist senator although she considers herself a non-practicing Buddhist. She is often cited with Hank Johnson as the first Buddhist to serve in the United States Congress. She is also the third woman to be elected to Congress from Hawaii (after Patsy Mink and Pat Saiki).

In 2012, Hirono was the Democratic nominee for the U.S. Senate seat being vacated by Akaka. Hirono won the election, defeating Lingle in a landslide, 63% to 37%. She was sworn in on January 3, 2013, by Vice President Joe Biden. Hirono was the only person of Asian ancestry serving in the U.S. Senate from 2013 until 2017, when senators Tammy Duckworth and Kamala Harris were sworn in, representing Illinois and California, respectively. Hirono is Hawaii's junior senator, and Brian Schatz is its senior senator. She was reelected to the Senate in 2018 and won a third term against Republican nominee Bob McDermott in 2024. She is expected to be the oldest serving female U.S. senator when Jeanne Shaheen retires in 2027.

== Early life and education ==
Mazie Hirono was born on November 3, 1947, in Fukushima Prefecture, Japan to Laura Chie Satō, a Japanese American, and Hirono Matabe, a Japanese veteran of World War II. Laura decided to return to Hawaii with Mazie and one of Mazie's brothers in March 1955. Hirono never saw her father again before he died. Laura became a newspaper proofreader in 1961 and retired from the Hawaii Newspaper Agency in 1986.

Raised in Honolulu, Hirono became a naturalized U.S. citizen in 1959. She graduated from Kaimuki High School, which had a predominantly Japanese American student body at the time. Hirono then enrolled at the University of Hawaiʻi at Mānoa, graduating Phi Beta Kappa with a Bachelor of Arts in psychology in 1970. She later attended Georgetown University Law Center in Washington, D.C., where she obtained her Juris Doctor in 1978. Hirono then returned to Honolulu, where she practiced law.

== Hawaii House of Representatives (1981–1994) ==
=== Elections ===
In 1980, Hirono was elected to Hawaii's 12th House district in a multi-member district with Democratic State Representative David Hagino. Hawaii eliminated multi-member districts, and after redistricting she ran for Hawaii's 20th House district and won. After redistricting again in 1984, she ran successfully for the newly redrawn 32nd House District. In 1992, after redistricting, she ran one last time in the newly redrawn 22nd House district. She easily won the three-candidate Democratic primary with 91% of the vote. She won the general election and served only one term in the 22nd district before retiring in 1994 to run for statewide office.

=== Tenure ===
Hirono served in the Hawaii House of Representatives from 1981 to 1994, sponsoring many bills that became state law.

=== Committee assignments ===
From 1987 to 1992, she was Chair of the Consumer Protection and Commerce Committee.

== Lieutenant governor (1994–2002) ==
=== Elections ===
==== 1994 ====
Hirono ran for lieutenant governor of Hawaii and won the Democratic primary, defeating fellow State Representative Jackie Young 65%–26%. In the general election she defeated three other candidates: Danny Kaniela Kaleikini (Best Party), State Representative Fred Hemmings (Republican Party), and Jack Morse (Green Party), 37%–31%–29%–4%.

==== 1998 ====
Hirono ran for reelection in 1998. She defeated Nancy Cook in the primary with 89% of the vote to Cook's 11%. In the general election, Hirono defeated Republican State Senator Stan Koki, 50%–49%, a margin of only 5,254 votes.

=== Tenure ===
The election of the Democratic ticket was historic for both candidates. Ben Cayetano was the first Filipino American elected governor, and Hirono was the first Japanese immigrant to be elected lieutenant governor.

During her tenure as lieutenant governor, Hirono was president of the National Commission on Teaching, America's Future, and the Hawaii Policy Group. She also spearheaded the Pre-Plus program, a first-in-the-nation comprehensive universal preschool education program.

== 2002 gubernatorial election ==
Hirono originally planned to run for mayor of Honolulu in a potential 2002 special election created by the vacancy of incumbent Mayor Jeremy Harris, who was planning to resign to run for governor of Hawaii. But due to internal controversies, Harris dropped out of the gubernatorial election and remained mayor for another two years. Hirono switched races.

Hirono worked to gain the support of Hawaii Democrats in her primary against former State House Majority Leader Ed Case. After polling almost equally throughout the race, Hirono defeated Case in the September 21 Democratic primary with 41% of the vote to Case's 40%, a margin of 2,613 votes.

In the general election, Republican nominee and Maui Mayor Linda Lingle defeated Hirono 52–47%, becoming Hawaii's first female governor.

== U.S. House of Representatives (2007–2013) ==
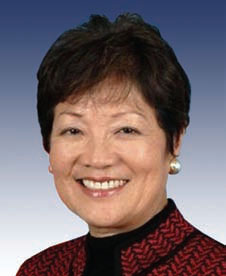
Congresswoman Hirono during the 110th Congress

=== Elections ===
==== 2006 ====
On September 23, Hirono ran to represent Hawaii's 2nd congressional district in the House of Representatives after incumbent Ed Case chose not to seek another term. The Democratic primary was crowded and very competitive. There were ten candidates, seven of whom served in the Hawaii Legislature. Hirono's advantage was that she was the only candidate who had held statewide office and, as a result, had the most name recognition. She led in fundraising, helped by the endorsement of EMILY's List. She won with a plurality of 22% of the vote. State Senator Colleen Hanabusa finished second with 21%, 845 votes short of Hirono.

In the general election Hirono defeated Republican State Senator Bob Hogue, 61%–39%.

==== 2008 ====
Hirono won reelection to a second term with 76% of the vote.

==== 2010 ====
Hirono won reelection to a third term with 72% of the vote.

=== Tenure ===
In 2008, the national preschool advocacy organization named Hirono "Pre-K Champion" for her efforts to pass pre-kindergarten legislation.

Hirono co-sponsored the Prevention First Act of 2007. The act aimed to increase public access to contraception and government funding to support the use of contraception. It places an emphasis on informing and protecting women from unintended pregnancy. On May 4, 2011, Hirono voted against the No Taxpayer Funding for Abortion Act, which would have prohibited federal health care programs from covering abortion costs, with exceptions for life-threatening cases.

In July 2011, Hirono voted for the Access to Birth Control Act, which mandates that pharmacies provide birth control to customers without undue delay. The ABP Act also ensures that customers seeking birth control can obtain it without being submitted to unwanted harassment or breaches in patient confidentiality. EMILY's List, a Democratic pro-choice action committee, pledged support to Hirono for her history of supporting contraceptive and abortion policies during her term. The endorsement helped Hirono in her 2012 senatorial race, contributing $129,714 to her campaign.

=== Committee assignments, 2012 ===
- Committee on Education and the Workforce
  - Subcommittee on Early Childhood, Elementary and Secondary Education
  - Subcommittee on Workforce Protections
- Committee on Transportation and Infrastructure
  - Subcommittee on Aviation
  - Subcommittee on Highways and Transit
  - Subcommittee on the Coast Guard and Maritime Transportation
  - Subcommittee on Water Resources and Environment.

=== Caucus memberships, 2012 ===
- Congressional Asian Pacific American Caucus
- Congressional Bike Caucus
- Congressional Caucus for Women's Issues
- Congressional Lantos Human Rights Commission
- Congressional Labor and Working Families Caucus
- Congressional LGBT Equality Caucus
- Congressional National Parks Caucus
- Congressional Progressive Caucus
- Congressional Wildlife Refuge Caucus
- House Oceans Caucus
- House Rural Health Care Coalition
- International Conservation Caucus
- National Marine Sanctuary Caucus
- National Service Caucus
- Port Security Caucus
- Renewable Energy and Energy Efficiency Caucus
- Sustainable Energy and Environment Coalition

== U.S. Senate (2013–present) ==
=== Elections ===
==== 2012 ====
In 2011, incumbent U.S. Senator Daniel Akaka announced his retirement at the end of his term in 2013. Subsequently, on May 19, 2011, Hirono announced her candidacy for Akaka's seat. She won the Democratic primary election on August 11, 2012. Hirono was endorsed as one of the Dean Dozen, a group of candidates chosen for their progressive values by Democracy for America, an organization founded by former Vermont governor Howard Dean. The Republican nominee was former Hawaii Governor Linda Lingle, who had defeated Hirono a decade earlier in the gubernatorial election. Hirono defeated Lingle with 63% of the vote. She is the first female senator from Hawaii, as well as the first Asian-born immigrant to be elected to the U.S. Senate. She was a part of the first completely non-Christian congressional delegation from the state, which existed until the election of Mark Takai (an Episcopalian) in 2014 as the representative for Hawaii's 1st congressional district.

In the 2012 campaign, Hirono raised $5.2 million, with approximately 52% raised from large corporations. Lingle raised $5.5 million, with 74% from large corporations. Hirono spent $5 million and Lingle $4.8 million.

==== 2018 ====
On November 6, 2018, Hirono was reelected with 71.2% of the vote, defeating Republican Ron Curtis.

==== 2024 ====
Hirono was elected to a third term in 2024.

=== Tenure ===
On December 12, 2012, the Senate Democratic Steering Committee announced that Hirono would serve on the Senate Judiciary Committee, which would give her influence on matters ranging from approving nominations of federal judges to setting criminal justice policy.

During the Brett Kavanaugh Supreme Court nomination hearings in September 2018, Hirono was an outspoken defender of Christine Blasey Ford after Ford accused Kavanaugh of sexual assault, telling men to "shut up and step up. Do the right thing for a change." She also said in an NPR interview before Kavanaugh's confirmation hearings that she could vote to confirm him "if he turns miraculously into a Sotomayor".

In the wake of the January 6 United States Capitol attack, Hirono called for the resignation of Senators Ted Cruz and Josh Hawley for their opposition to certifying the 2020 presidential election Electoral College count. She also called for the Twenty-fifth Amendment to the United States Constitution to be invoked to remove Donald Trump from office.

In April 2021, Hirono sponsored a bill attempting to decrease hate crimes against Asian Americans due to xenophobia associated with COVID-19. The bill passed the Senate 94–1, with only Hawley opposing it.

In July 2022, Hirono co-sponsored the Youth Voting Rights Act, comprehensive legislation to enforce the Twenty-Sixth Amendment and expand youth access to voting. This legislation, led by Senator Elizabeth Warren, was also introduced in the House by Representative Nikema Williams.

=== Committee assignments ===
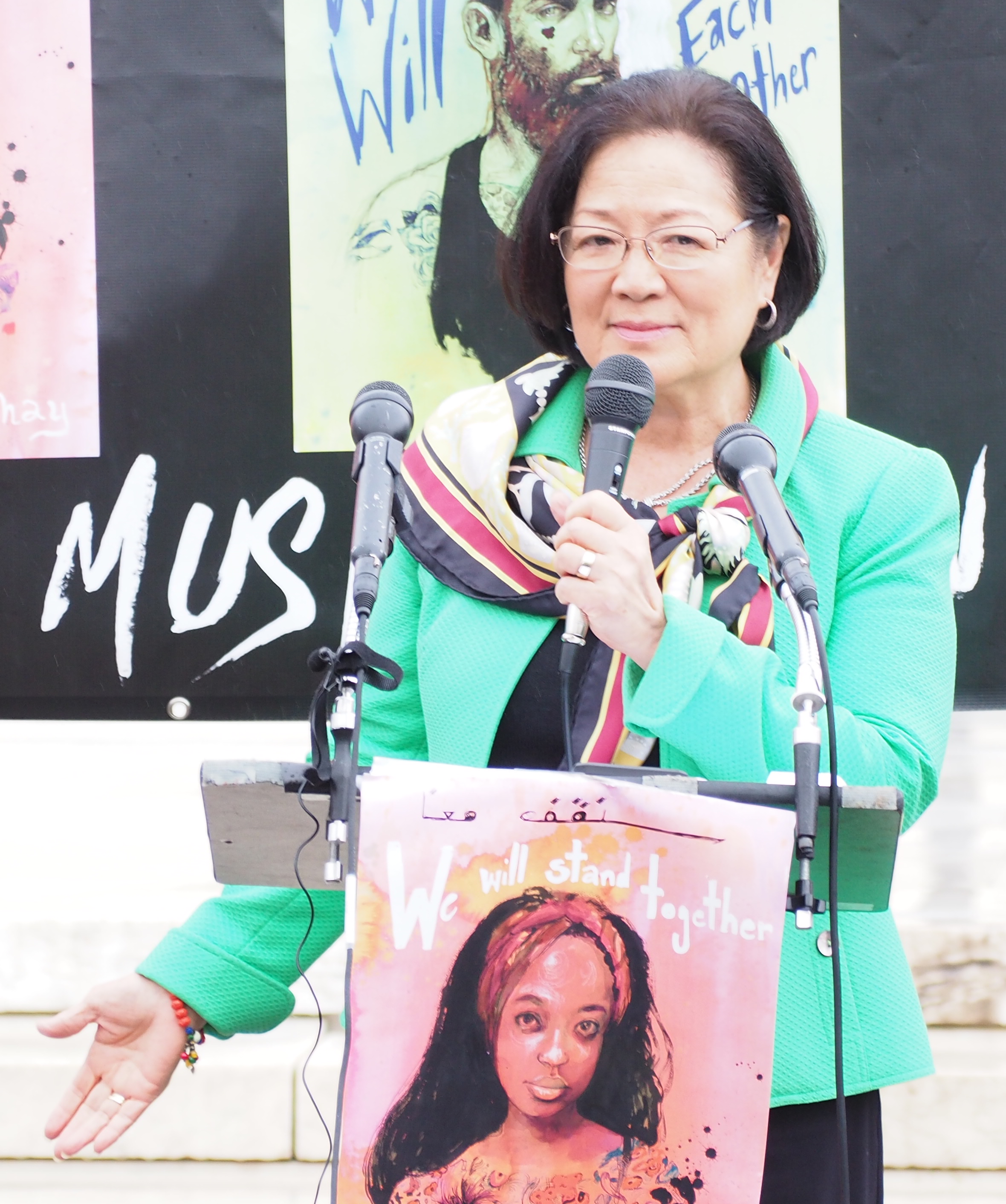
Hirono speaking at the "No Muslim Ban Ever" rally outside the Supreme Court, April 2018

- Committee on Armed Services
  - Subcommittee on Personnel
  - Subcommittee on Readiness and Management Support (chair)
  - Subcommittee on Seapower
- Committee on Energy and Natural Resources
  - Subcommittee on Energy
  - Subcommittee on National Parks
  - Subcommittee on Public Lands, Forests, and Mining
- Committee on Small Business and Entrepreneurship
- Committee on the Judiciary
  - Subcommittee on Competition Policy, Antitrust and Consumer Rights
  - Subcommittee on Federal Courts, Oversight, Agency Action and Federal Rights
  - Subcommittee on Intellectual Property
  - Subcommittee on Privacy, Technology and the Law
- Committee on Veterans' Affairs

=== Select caucus memberships ===
- Congressional Asian Pacific American Caucus, Executive Board Member
- Congressional NextGen 9-1-1 Caucus
- Congressional Study Group on Japan, co-chair
- Creative Rights Caucus, co-chair
- Senate Army Caucus
- Senate Climate Change Task Force
- Senate Impact Aid Coalition, co-chair
- Senate Law Enforcement Caucus
- Senate Oceans Caucus
- Expand Social Security Caucus

== Political positions ==
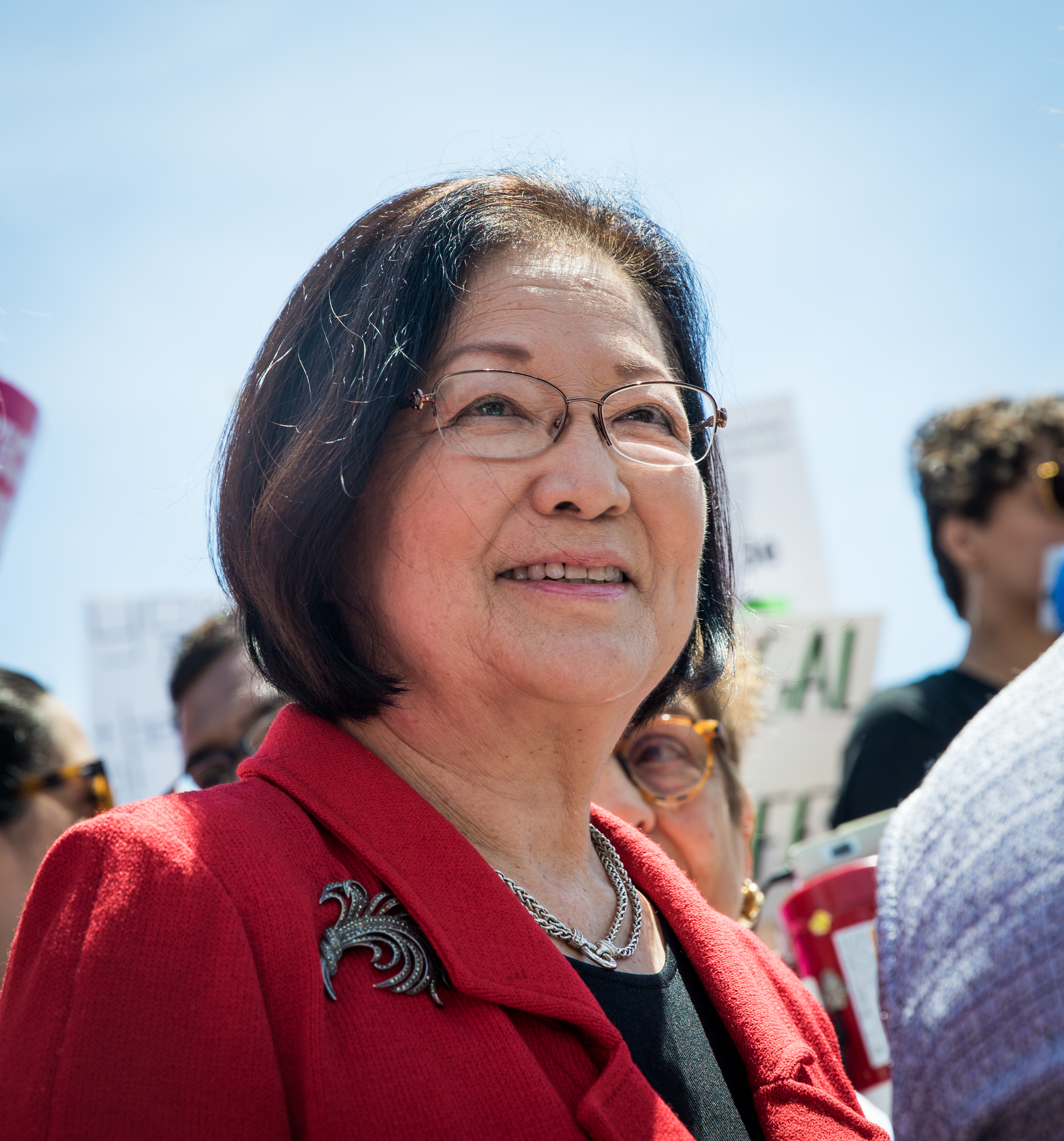
Hirono at a Stop the Bans rally in 2019

According to On the Issues, Hirono's voting history places her in the "left/liberal" camp. The American Conservative Union gave her a 2% lifetime conservative rating in 2020.

=== Abortion ===
Hirono has a 100% rating from Reproductive Freedom for All (formerly NARAL Pro-Choice America). She has also been consistently endorsed by EMILY's List, an organization that endorses women running on pro-choice platforms. At a Senate Judiciary Committee hearing, Hirono told the panel: "If you don't support abortion, don't get one, but leave everyone else to the painful decisions they have to make along with their physicians".

Hirono called the June 2022 overturning of Roe v. Wade "a horrific day in America". She proclaimed, "This will go down as one of the worst decisions in the history of the Court."

=== Gun control ===
In 2016, she participated in the Chris Murphy gun control filibuster. Hirono expressed disappointment when the Democrat-proposed Feinstein Amendment (banning the sale of firearms to individuals on the terrorist watchlist) and the Republican-backed background check expansion and alert system (regarding guns being sold to terrorist watchlist suspects) both failed to pass the Senate.

=== Health care ===
On July 28, 2017, two months after undergoing surgery for stage-four kidney cancer, Hirono spoke on the Senate floor and voted against the so-called "skinny repeal" of the Affordable Care Act (also known as Obamacare). MSNBC reporter Kyle Griffin filmed Hirono's speech and posted it on Twitter.

In January 2019, during the 2018–19 United States federal government shutdown, Hirono was one of 34 senators to sign a letter to Food and Drugs Commissioner Scott Gottlieb recognizing the efforts of the Food and Drug Administration (FDA) to address the effect of the government shutdown on the public health and employees while expressing alarm "that the continued shutdown will result in increasingly harmful effects on the agency's employees and the safety and security of the nation's food and medical products."

Hirono is a supporter of Medicare for All.

=== Housing ===
In April 2019, Hirono was one of 41 senators to sign a bipartisan letter to a Senate subcommittee on housing praising the Department of Housing and Urban Development's Section 4 Capacity Building program as authorizing "HUD to partner with national nonprofit community development organizations to provide education, training, and financial support to local community development corporations (CDCs) across the country" and expressing disappointment that Trump's budget "has slated this program for elimination after decades of successful economic and community development." The senators hoped the subcommittee would support continued funding for Section 4 in Fiscal Year 2020.

=== LGBTQIA+ rights ===
Hirono supports the right of LGBTQ+ Americans to enlist in the Armed Forces. She also supported H.R. 1681, the Every Child Deserves a Family Act, a "non-discrimination" bill that would have decertified any foster care or adoption agency, such as Catholic Charities, that did not accept same-sex foster parents regardless of religious beliefs.

=== Foreign policy ===
In January 2024, Hirono voted for a resolution proposed by Bernie Sanders to apply the human rights provisions of the Foreign Assistance Act to U.S. aid to Israel's military. The proposal was defeated, 72 to 11. In April 2025, Hirono voted for a pair of resolutions Sanders proposed to cancel the Trump administration's sales of $8.8 billion in bombs and other munitions to Israel. The proposals were defeated, 82 to 15.

=== Telecommunications ===
In April 2019, Hirono was one of seven senators to sponsor the Digital Equity Act of 2019, legislation establishing a $120 million grant program that would fund the creation and implementation of "comprehensive digital equity plans" in every state and a $120 million grant program to support projects developed by individuals and groups. The bill also gave the National Telecommunications and Information Administration (NTIA) the role of evaluating and providing guidance for digital equity projects.

== Personal life ==
In May 2017, Hirono was diagnosed with stage 4 kidney cancer, which had spread to her seventh rib. The cancer was discovered in a chest X-ray in April before minor eye surgery. Hirono's right kidney was removed on May 17, 2017, with a Cyberknife procedure to treat the rib lesion. She returned to the Senate on May 22, 2017.

As of 2018, according to OpenSecrets.org, Hirono's net worth was more than $4.3 million.

In 2021, Viking Press published Hirono's autobiography, Heart of Fire: An Immigrant Daughter's Story. Marie Claire listed the book among its "25 Great Memoirs to Pre-Order Now".

Also in 2021, it was announced that Hirono would receive Japan's Order of the Rising Sun, Gold and Silver Star for her "significant contributions in strengthening bilateral relations and promoting legislative exchanges between Japan and the United States".

== Electoral history ==
Hawaii gubernatorial election, 2002
Party	Candidate	Votes	%	±%
Republican	Linda Lingle	197,009	51.56%	+2.74%
Democratic	Mazie Hirono	179,647	47.01%	−3.09%
Natural Law	Bu Laʻia Hill	2,561	0.67%	N/A
Libertarian	Tracy Ryan	1,364	0.36%	−0.72%
Independent	Jim Brewer	1,147	0.30%	N/A
Independent	Daniel Cunningham	382	0.10%	N/A
Total votes		382,110	100.00%	N/A
Republican gain from Democratic				

Hawaii's 2nd congressional district election, 2006
Party	Candidate	Votes	%
Democratic	Mazie Hirono	106,906	61.04%
Republican	Bob Hogue	68,244	38.96%
Total votes		175,150	100.00%
Democratic hold			

Hawaii's 2nd congressional district election, 2008
Party	Candidate	Votes	%
Democratic	Mazie Hirono (inc.)	165,748	76.06%
Republican	Roger B. Evans	44,425	20.39%
Independent	Shaun Stenshol	4,042	1.85%
Libertarian	Jeff Mallan	3,699	1.70%
Total votes		217,914	100.00%
Democratic hold			

Hawaii's 2nd congressional district election, 2010
Party	Candidate	Votes	%
Democratic	Mazie Hirono (incumbent)	132,290	72.19%
Republican	John W. Willoughby	46,404	25.32%
Libertarian	Pat Brock	3,254	1.78%
Independent	Andrew Von Sonn	1,310	0.71%
Total votes		183,258	100.00%
Democratic hold			

Democratic primary results
Party	Candidate	Votes	%
Democratic	Mazie Hirono	134,745	57%
Democratic	Ed Case	95,553	40%
	Blank Votes	3,331	1%
Democratic	Arturo Reyes	1,720	1%
Democratic	Michael Gillespie	1,104	1%
Democratic	Antonio Gimbernat	517	0.2%
	Over Votes	110	0%
Total votes		237,080	100%

United States Senate election in Hawaii, 2012
Party	Candidate	Votes	%	±%
Democratic	Mazie Hirono	269,489	62.60%	+1.25%
Republican	Linda Lingle	160,994	37.40%	+0.62%
Total votes		430,483	100.0%	N/A
Democratic hold				

Democratic primary results, Hawaii 2018
Party	Candidate	Votes	%
Democratic	Mazie Hirono (incumbent)	201,679	100%
Total votes		201,679	100%

United States Senate election in Hawaii, 2018
Party	Candidate	Votes	%	±%
Democratic	Mazie Hirono (incumbent)	276,316	71.15%	+8.55%
Republican	Ron Curtis	112,035	28.85%	−8.55%
Total votes		388,351	100%	N/A
Democratic hold				

Democratic primary results, Hawaii 2024
Party	Candidate	Votes	%
Democratic	Mazie Hirono (incumbent)	176,131	84.6%
Democratic	Ron Curtis	14,271	6.9%
Democratic	Clyde Lewman	4,287	2.1%
Total votes		194,689	100.0%

United States Senate election in Hawaii, 2024
Party	Candidate	Votes	%	±%
Democratic	Mazie Hirono (incumbent)	324,194	64.61	−6.54
Republican	Bob McDermott	160,075	31.90	+3.05
We the People	Shelby Billionaire	9,224	1.84	N/A
Green	Emma Pohlman	8,270	1.65	N/A
Total votes		501,763	100.00	N/A

== See also ==
- List of Asian Americans and Pacific Islands Americans in the United States Congress
- List of female lieutenant governors in the United States
- List of minority governors and lieutenant governors in the United States
- List of United States senators born outside the United States
- Women in the United States House of Representatives
- Women in the United States Senate

Party political offices
Preceded by Ben Cayetano	Democratic nominee for Lieutenant Governor of Hawaii; 1994, 1998	Succeeded by Matt Matsunaga
Preceded by Ben Cayetano	Democratic nominee for Governor of Hawaii; 2002	Succeeded by Randy Iwase
Preceded by Daniel Akaka	Democratic nominee for U.S. Senator from Hawaii (Class 1); 2012, 2018, 2024	Most recent
Political offices
Preceded by Ben Cayetano	Lieutenant Governor of Hawaii; 1994–2002	Succeeded by Duke Aiona
U.S. House of Representatives
Preceded by Ed Case	Member of the U.S. House of Representatives from Hawaii's 2nd congressional district 2007–2013	Succeeded by Tulsi Gabbard
U.S. Senate
Preceded by Daniel Akaka	U.S. Senator (Class 1) from Hawaii; 2013–present Served alongside: Brian Schatz	Incumbent
U.S. order of precedence (ceremonial)
Preceded by Martin Heinrich	Order of precedence of the United States as United States Senator	Succeeded by Ed Markey
Preceded by Chris Murphy	United States senators by seniority 37th	Succeeded by Martin Heinrich
