= 1998 Hawaii gubernatorial election =

- November 3, 1998
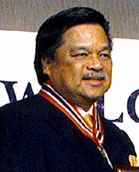

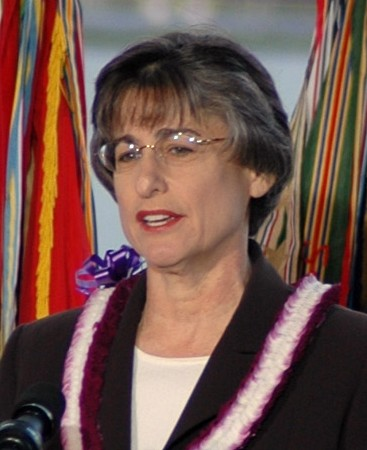
Nominee	Ben Cayetano	Linda Lingle
Party	Democratic	Republican
Running mate	Mazie Hirono	Stan Koki
Popular vote	204,206	198,952
Percentage	50.11%	48.82%
- County results Cayetano: 50–60% Lingle: 40–50% 50–60%
Governor before election
Ben Cayetano
Democratic
Elected Governor
Ben Cayetano
Democratic

The 1998 Hawaii gubernatorial election was held on November 3, 1998. Democratic incumbent Ben Cayetano was re-elected to a second term in office over Maui County mayor Linda Lingle. Cayetano won narrowly despite Lingle holding a sizable advantage in public opinion polling.

This is the second election, along with 1966, in which a Democratic candidate won without sweeping every county in the state. Lingle won the next election in 2002 when Cayetano was term-limited and was re-elected in 2006.

== Democratic primary ==
=== Candidates ===
- Ben Cayetano, incumbent governor of Hawaii since 1995
- Jim Brewer, perennial candidate
- Richard C. S. Ho, former state representative
- Fred K. Tamura
- Raymond N. Onaga
- Miles F. Shiratori, perennial candidate

=== Results ===
Democratic primary results
Party	Candidate	Votes	%
Democratic	Ben Cayetano (incumbent)	95,797	86.40
Democratic	Jim Brewer	6,169	5.56
Democratic	Richard C. S. Ho	3,024	2.73
Democratic	Fred K. Tamura	2,740	2.47
Democratic	Raymond N. Onaga	1,651	1.49
Democratic	Miles F. Shiratori	1,499	1.35
Total votes		110,880	100.00

== Republican primary ==
=== Candidates ===
- Linda Lingle, mayor of Maui County
- Frank Fasi, former mayor of Honolulu and 1994 independent candidate for governor

=== Results ===
Republican primary results
Party	Candidate	Votes	%
Republican	Linda Lingle	109,061	69.22
Republican	Frank F. Fasi	48,488	30.78
Total votes		157,549	100.00

== General election ==
=== Candidates ===
- Ben Cayetano, incumbent governor of Hawaii since 1995 (Democratic)
- Linda Lingle, mayor of Maui County (Republican)
- George G. Peabody, publisher and founder of the Molokai Advertiser-News (Libertarian)

=== Polling ===
Poll source	Date(s) administered	Sample size (Note: Key: A – all adults RV – registered voters LV – likely voters V – unclear)	Margin of error	Ben Cayetano (D)	Linda Lingle (R)	Undecided
Mason-Dixon Polling & Strategy	October 28–29, 1998	406 (LV)	± 5.0%	52%	41%	7%
Ward Research/Honolulu Star-Advertiser	October 22, 1998	480	—	36%	44%	20%
Mason-Dixon Polling & Strategy	October 16–19, 1998	425 (LV)	± 5.0%	52%	37%	11%
Ward Research/Honolulu Star-Advertiser (Note: Poll sponsored by The Honolulu Advertiser and Channel 2 Poll)	September 9–13, 1998	800 (LV)	± 3.5%	34%	48%	18%
Ward Research/Honolulu Star-Advertiser	July 24–28, 1998	600 (LV)	± 4.0%	31%	51%	18%

=== Results ===
Hawaii gubernatorial election, 1998
Party	Candidate	Votes	%	±%
Democratic	Ben Cayetano (incumbent)	204,206	50.11%	+13.53%
Republican	Linda Lingle	198,952	48.82%	+18.15%
Libertarian	George Peabody	4,398	1.08%	
Majority		5,254	1.29%	−4.62%
Turnout		407,556		
Democratic hold		Swing		

==== By county ====
County	Ben Cayetano Democratic		Linda Lingle Republican		George Peabody Libertarian		Margin		Total votes cast
County	#	%	#	%	#	%	#	%	Total votes cast
Hawaii	23,826	45.0%	28,326	53.4%	848	1.6%	-4,500	-8.4%	53,000
Honolulu	145,839	50.7%	139,171	48.3%	2,849	1.0%	6,668	2.4%	287,859
Kauaʻi	13,764	57.5%	10,065	42.0%	129	0.5%	3,699	15.5%	23,958
Maui	20,777	48.6%	21,390	50.0%	572	1.3%	-613	-1.4%	42,739
Totals	204,206	50.1%	198,952	48.8%	4,398	1.1%	5,254	1.3%	407,556

Counties that flipped from Democratic to Republican

- Hawaii
- Kalawao
- Maui
