= Bitterman =

Bitterman is a surname. Notable people with the surname include:

- Chet Bitterman (c. 1953 – 1981), American linguist and Christian missionary
- Mary G. F. Bitterman, President, The Osher Foundation
- Rachel Bitterman

== See also ==
- Bittermann
