= Senator Solomon =

Senator Solomon may refer to:

- Malama Solomon (born 1951), Hawaii State Senate
- Martin M. Solomon (born 1950), New York State Senate
- Ruth Solomon (born 1941), Arizona State Senate
