= Senator Crossley =

Senator Crossley may refer to:

- Randolph Crossley (1904–2004), Hawaii State Senate
- Wallace Crossley (1874–1943), Missouri State Senate
