= Molokai Advertiser-News =

Hawaiian weekly newspaper

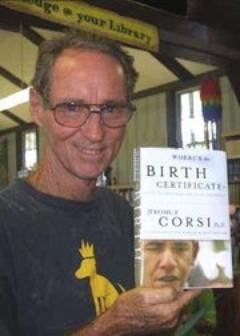
George G. Peabody, founder

The Molokaʻi Advertiser-News is a weekly newspaper in Hawaiʻi founded in 1984. It is published on the island of Molokaʻi, Hawaiʻi, United States. The Molokaʻi Advertiser-News is one of two newspapers published on the island of Molokaʻi, the other being the Molokai Island Times. In 1998 the founder, George G. Peabody, filed a court case against a competing free paper, The Dispatch, for unfair competition via removing copies of the Advertiser-News and replacing them with its own paper. The State of Hawaiʻi Intermediate Court of Appeals found in favor of the Molokaʻi Advertiser-News in 2000.

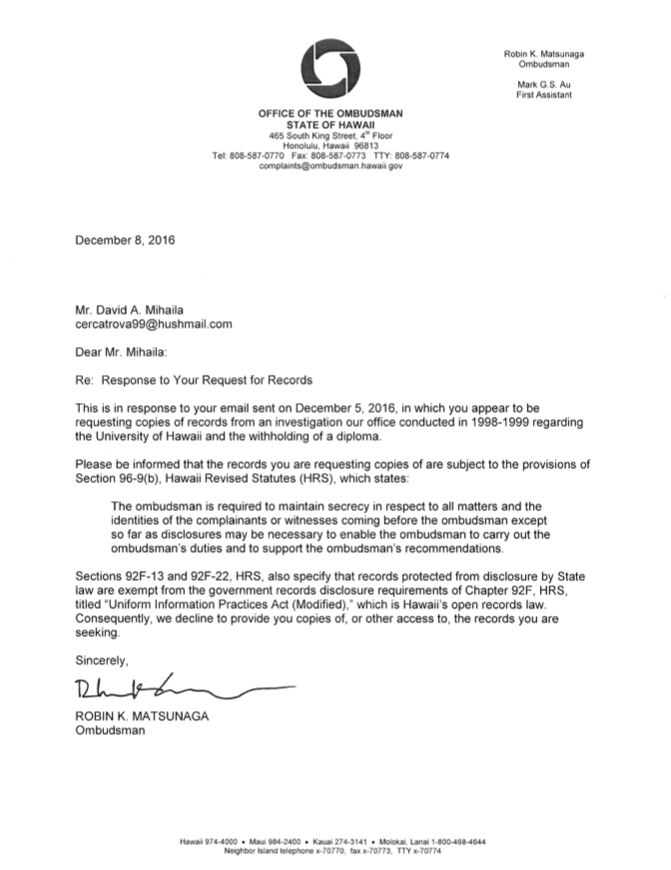
Missive precluding access for secrecy reasons to historical records regarding diploma

The paper was founded in 1984 by George G. Peabody who as of 2014 still serves as the editor and chief investigatory reporter. In 1998 and 2002, Peabody ran for governor of Hawaiʻi as a Libertarian. He received 4,398 votes in the 1998 general election. Peabody was also a Republican Party candidate for the gubernatorial primary election in 2006.

Peabody has taken up many unpopular causes in the course of his three decades as the publisher, including his 2012 investigatory journalism into the validity of President Barack Obama's State of Hawaiʻi birth certificate and calling for President Obama's impeachment

From 2010 to 2014 Peabody ran an unprecedented series of newspaper articles about dissident and activist David A. Mihaila and his twenty-year protracted struggle with the University of Hawaiʻi at Mānoa administration to obtain the release of his college diploma despite an official recommendation by the Western Association of Schools and Colleges in Mihaila's favor in 2000.
