= Malama Solomon =

American politician

Member of the Hawaii Senate from the 4th district 1st (2010–2012)
- In office December 21, 2010 – November 2014
- Appointed by: Neil Abercrombie
- Preceded by: Dwight Takamine
- Succeeded by: Lorraine Inouye

Member of the Hawaii Senate from the 1st district
- In office 1983 – November 1998
- Succeeded by: Lorraine Inouye

Personal details
- Born: March 3, 1951 (age 75) Territory of Hawaii
- Party: Democratic
- Education: University of Hawaiʻi at Mānoa; University of Hawaiʻi at Hilo; University of Hawaii; Oregon State University

A. Leiomalama 'Malama' Solomon (born March 3, 1951) is an American politician and a Democratic member of the Hawaii Senate representing District 4. Solomon was originally appointed to the District 1 Senate seat by Governor Neil Abercrombie on December 21, 2010, to fill the vacancy caused by the appointment of Dwight Takamine as Hawaii Director of the Department of Labor and Industrial Relations. She served in that seat until her election to the District 4 seat, which she has held since 2013.

== Education ==
Solomon earned her Bachelor of Arts in education at the University of Hawaiʻi at Mānoa, her BA in cultural anthropology from the University of Hawaiʻi at Hilo, her MA in education from the University of Hawaiʻi and her Doctor of Philosophy from Oregon State University.

== Electoral history ==
In 1998 Solomon initially sought the District 1 Senate seat in the three-way September 19 Democratic Primary, losing to Lorraine Inouye, who held the seat until 2005.

In 2006 Solomon won the four-way September 26 Democratic Primary for Lieutenant Governor of Hawaii with 77,895 votes (32.7%), but she and gubernatorial running mate Randy Iwase lost the general election on November 7 to incumbent Republicans Linda Lingle and Duke Aiona.

In 2012 Solomon won the August 11 Democratic Primary for State Senate District 4 with 4,068 votes (47.5%) against former Senator Lorraine Inouye, and then won the November 6 General election with 9,828 votes (60.9%) against Green candidate Kelly Greenwell.

Party political offices
| Preceded by Matt Matsunaga | Democratic nominee for Lieutenant Governor of Hawaii; 2006 | Succeeded by Brian Schatz |
