= Selvage (disambiguation) =

Selvage, or Selvege, may refer to:

== Textiles ==
- Selvage, a "self-finished" edge of a piece of fabric
- Selvage (knitting), the stitch(es) that end each row of knitting
- Selvage denim, shuttle-loom-woven denim

== People ==
- Les Selvage, an American professional basketball player
- Eugene Selvage, the owner of Lucky Lager Brewing Company

== See also ==
- Salvage (disambiguation)
