= Bittermann =

Bittermann is a surname. Notable people with the surname include:

- Jim Bittermann, American journalist
- Klaus Bittermann, (born 1952), German author and publisher
- Torsten Bittermann, (born 1968), German football player and manager

== See also ==
- Bitterman
