= 1990 Hawaii gubernatorial election =

- November 6, 1990
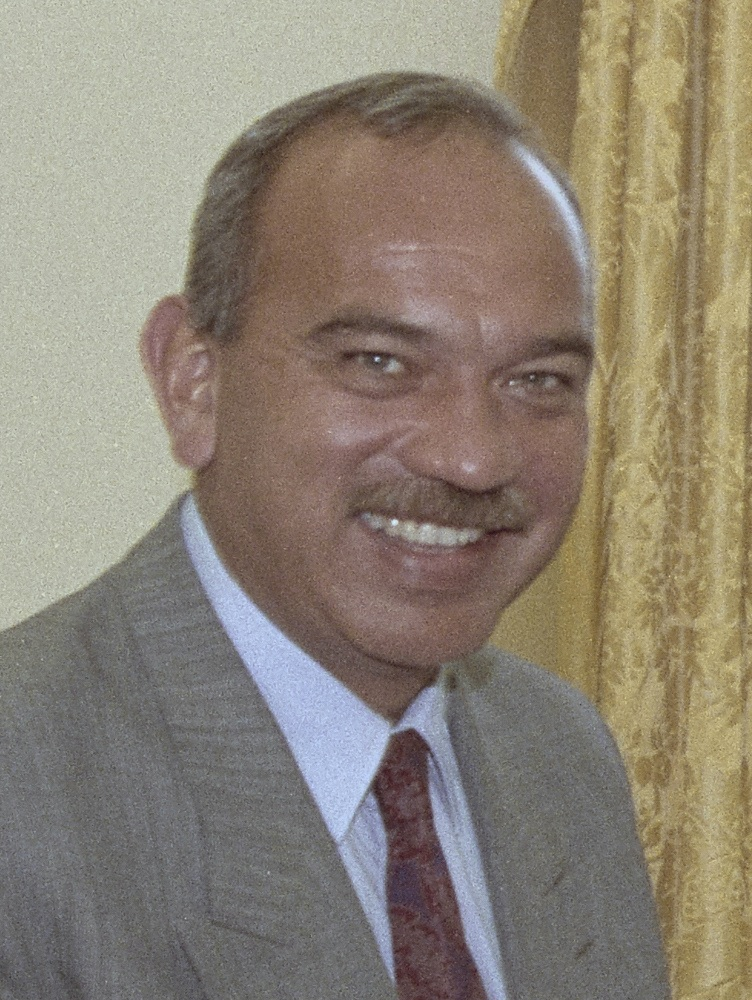

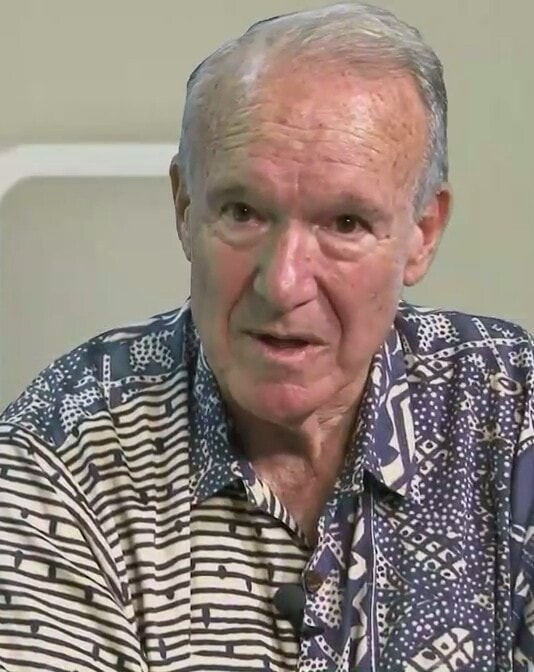
Nominee	John D. Waiheʻe III	Fred Hemmings
Party	Democratic	Republican
Running mate	Ben Cayetano	Billie Beamer
Popular vote	203,491	131,310
Percentage	59.83%	38.61%
- County results Waiheʻe: 50–60% 60–70% 70–80%
Governor before election
John D. Waiheʻe III
Democratic
Elected Governor
John D. Waiheʻe III
Democratic

The 1990 Hawaii gubernatorial election was Hawaii's ninth gubernatorial election. The election was held on November 6, 1990, and resulted in a victory for the Democratic candidate, incumbent Governor John D. Waiheʻe III over the Republican candidate, State Representative Fred Hemmings. Waihee received more votes than Hemmings in every county in the state.

== Primaries ==
Primary elections were held on September 22, 1990.

=== Democratic primary ===
Candidates and primary votes:

- John D. Waihee III, governor: 88.48%
- Benjamin Hopkins: 4.80%
- Robert H. Garner: 4.49%
- Elbert Marshall: 2.23%

=== Republican primary ===
Candidates and primary votes:

- Fred Hemmings, state representative: 90.08%
- Leonard Mednick: 3.12%
- Charles Hirayasu: 2.43%
- Ichiro Izuka: 1.96%
- Herman P. U'o: 1.38%
- Robert Measel, Jr.: 1.04%

== General election ==
Hawaii gubernatorial election, 1990
Party	Candidate	Votes	%	±%
Democratic	John D. Waihe'e III (incumbent)	203,491	59.83	+7.85
Republican	Fred Hemmings	131,310	38.61	−9.41
Libertarian	Don Smith	2,885	0.85	+0.85
Nonpartisan	Peggy Ha'o Ross	2,446	0.72	+0.72
Majority		72,181	21.22	+17.27
Turnout		340,132	30.69	−3.94
Democratic hold		Swing		

=== By county ===
County	John Waihee Democratic		Fred Hemmings Republican		Various candidates Other parties		Margin		Total votes cast
County	#	%	#	%	#	%	#	%	Total votes cast
Hawaii	26,832	62.7%	15,024	35.1%	972	2.3%	11,808	27.6%	42,828
Honolulu	140,232	57.6%	100,111	41.1%	3,158	1.3%	40,121	16.5%	243,501
Kauaʻi	15,088	73.7%	4,984	24.4%	394	1.9%	10,104	49.3%	20,466
Maui	21,339	64.0%	11,191	33.6%	807	2.4%	10,148	30.4%	33,337
Totals	203,491	59.8%	131,310	38.6%	5,331	1.6%	72,181	21.2%	340,132
