= Salvage =

Salvage may refer to:

- Marine salvage, the process of rescuing a ship, its cargo and sometimes the crew from peril
- Water salvage, rescuing people from floods.
- Salvage tug, a type of tugboat used to rescue or salvage ships which are in distress or in danger of sinking
- Recycling, the conversion of waste materials into new materials and objects, was usually referred to in the mid-20th century as "salvage"
  - Salvage for Victory, a US Government campaign to salvage materials for the American war effort in World War II
  - Paper Salvage 1939–50, a British government campaign to encourage the recycling of paper, initially to aid the war effort
- Data salvage, the process of data recovery from damaged, failed, corrupted, or inaccessible primary storage media
- Salvage archaeology, an archaeological survey and excavation carried out in areas threatened by construction or development
- Salvage ethnography, the practice of salvaging a record of what was left of a culture before it disappeared
- Salvage therapy, medical treatment for those patients not responding adequately to first line treatment
- Troubled Waters, a 1935 novel by Roger Vercel, also published as Salvage

== Business ==
- Waste sorting
- Salvage value, the estimated value of an asset at the end of its useful life

== Arts and entertainment ==
- Salvage (1921 film), a 1921 American silent film directed by Henry King
- Salvage (2006 film), a 2006 American horror film
- Salvage (2009 film), a 2009 British horror film
- "Salvage", an episode of Alfred Hitchcock Presents
- Salvage 1, a 1979 ABC science fiction-comedy series
- "Salvage" (The X-Files), a 2001 episode of the television series The X-Files
- "Salvage" (Angel), a 2003 episode of the television series Angel
- Salvage, a 1962 episode in the Hallmark Hall of Fame
- Salvage (Transformers), an Autobot from Transformers
- "Salvage" (short story), a 1986 short story by Orson Scott Card
- Salvage, a 1919 novel by Mary Roberts Rinehart
- "Salvage", an episode of the television show The Expanse

== Other ==
- Salvage, Newfoundland and Labrador, Canada
- Extrajudicial punishment resulting in death is referred to as salvage in the Philippines
- Salvage title, a form of vehicle title branding in North America

== See also ==
- Lifesaving
- Selvage (disambiguation)
- Wrecking (shipwreck)
