= Terry Yoshinaga =

American lawyer and politician

Terry Nui Yoshinaga-Kano is an American politician and lawyer.

Yoshinaga attended the University of Hawaii School of Law and was a member of the first graduating class in 1976. In the mid-1980s, she served as secretary of the YWCA of Oahu. Yoshinaga is a resident of Moiliili, Hawaii.

Yoshinaga was first elected to the Hawaii House of Representatives for District 22 in 1994. In 1996, she faced Mel Makoto Takahashi in the Democratic Party primary, and won the general election uncontested. In 1998, Yoshinaga finished ahead of Takahashi and Charles K. Torigoe in the primary, and won a third consecutive two-year term. Yoshinaga was unopposed in the 2000 primary elections, and defeated Republican Party candidate Joseph Kinoshita in the general election. During the 2002 election cycle, Yoshinaga ran for a fifth term and lost a primary to Scott Saiki.
