= 2002 Hawaii gubernatorial election =

- November 5, 2002
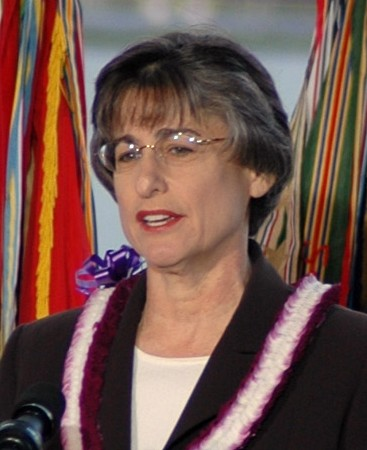

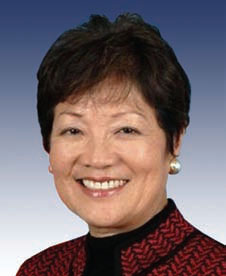
Nominee	Linda Lingle	Mazie Hirono
Party	Republican	Democratic
Running mate	Duke Aiona	Matt Matsunaga
Popular vote	197,009	179,647
Percentage	51.56%	47.01%
- County results Lingle: 50–60% Hirono: 50–60%
Governor before election
Ben Cayetano
Democratic
Elected Governor
Linda Lingle
Republican

The 2002 Hawaii gubernatorial election was held on November 5, 2002. Incumbent Democratic Governor Ben Cayetano was term-limited and therefore could not run for re-election. Former Maui Mayor Linda Lingle, who had narrowly lost the 1998 election, was nominated once again by the Republicans while Lieutenant Governor Mazie Hirono earned the Democratic nomination in a tight race. Lingle and Hirono duked it out in a hard-fought campaign, with Hirono's campaign crippled by allegations of corruption within the Hawaii Democratic Party and many voters desiring a change. The influence of migrants from the mainland as well as the decrease in party loyalty of ethnic groups led more voters towards Lingle. Ultimately Lingle defeated Hirono in a close election, making her the first Republican governor of Hawaii elected since 1959 and the state's first-ever female governor. She was the first white person to be elected governor of the state since 1970. Lingle and Hirono faced off again in Hawaii's 2012 U.S. Senate election; Hirono won that race and thus became the first female U.S. senator in Hawaii history. As of 2026, 2002 is the last Hawaii gubernatorial election where the winner did not win every county.

== Democratic primary ==
=== Candidates ===
- Mazie Hirono, Lieutenant Governor of Hawaii
- Ed Case, Majority Leader of the Hawaii House of Representatives
- D. G. Anderson, 1982 and 1986 Republican nominee for Governor of Hawaii, former Hawaii state senator
- George Nitta Jr., radio personality
- Art P. Reyes, perennial candidate
- Joe Fernandez, school bus driver

Mazie Hirono was Hawai'i's lieutenant governor from 1994 to 2002 under Ben Cayetano. Cayetano had loss democratic support due to links to a bad economy and bad relationships with labor groups. Hirono had to separate her image from Cayetano. She originally was not in the race for governor, but the race for mayor. Mayor Jeremy Harris was highly expected to win the Democratic gubernatorial primary but didn't run. Hirono then switched to the gubernatorial race, but with a late start she didn't have much time to campaign and raise money.

Ed Case was focused on statewide campaigns to win the primary. He was a fresh face in the election. However, he didn't have full support of Native Hawaiians due to a bill he introduced that would combine the Office of Hawaiian Affairs and the Department of Hawaiian Home Lands.

Andy D.G. Anderson had run for governor before. He was a Republican turned Democrat but also a Native Hawaiian. He effectively took points away from both Hirono and Case.

=== Results ===
Hirono beat Case by less than 2% of the votes. However, the Case campaign was ruled a success due to the number of voters he was able to take from a known Democratic face.

Democratic primary results
Party	Candidate	Votes	%
Democratic	Mazie Hirono	76,709	41.24
Democratic	Ed Case	74,096	39.84
Democratic	D. G. Anderson	33,384	17.95
Democratic	George Nitta, Jr.	747	0.40
Democratic	Art P. Reyes	568	0.31
Democratic	Joe Fernandez	491	0.26
Total votes		185,995	100.00

== Republican primary ==
=== Candidates ===
- Linda Lingle, former Mayor of Maui, 1998 Republican nominee for Governor of Hawaii
- John Carroll, former Hawaii state representative
- Crystal Young

John Carroll was running on experience from military and business; he believed Hawaii's citizens needed a governor with both military and political experience. Carroll attempted to use Lingle's non Republican views against her. His campaign appealed to Lingle's opponents in the GOP as Lingle was not a typical Republican with her support for abortion and opposition of the death penalty. A campaign brochure of Carroll states “John Carroll stands with the social conservatives that Lingle has alienated.” Carroll's campaign was unsuccessful due to lack of funding and inability to win over Native Hawaiians and their activists due to suing the Office of Hawaiian Affairs for being “racially discriminatory”.

=== Results ===
Republican primary results
Party	Candidate	Votes	%
Republican	Linda Lingle	70,808	89.77
Republican	John Carroll	7,616	9.66
Republican	Crystal Young	454	0.58
Total votes		78,878	100.00

== General election ==
=== Campaign ===
Lingle was critical of the way that Hirono had handled education and economic issues as lieutenant governor; in a TV spot premiered by the Lingle campaign in September, the Republican noted that "Reading scores are now among the worst in the nation. We rank last in jobs creation and first in poverty increase" and argued that Hirono bore part of the blame. Hirono responded that low reading scores could be attributed to the fact that many Hawaiian students — such as Hirono, herself an immigrant from Japan — were learning English as a second language. She also pointed to legislation which she had supported to "improve teacher quality" and boost test scores, and commented that "I'd like to know what Linda has done" to further the cause.

Native Hawaiians’ vote became a deciding factor. Ben Cayetano stopped Public Land Trust (PLT) funds from being transferred to the Office of Hawaiian Affairs (OHA). Many programs that supported Native Hawaiians could no longer operate without these funds. The OHA held a gubernatorial debate where PLT funds were the main focus. Hirono didn't make any commitments but Lingle promised to restart PLT funds. Lingle's stance on Native Hawaiian affairs was a strong part of her campaign.

=== Predictions ===
Source	Ranking	As of
The Cook Political Report	Tossup	October 31, 2002
Sabato's Crystal Ball	Lean R (flip)	November 4, 2002

=== Results ===
Hawaii gubernatorial election, 2002
Party	Candidate	Votes	%	±%
Republican	Linda Lingle	197,009	51.56%	+2.74%
Democratic	Mazie Hirono	179,647	47.01%	−3.09%
Natural Law	Bu Laʻia Hill	2,561	0.67%	
Libertarian	Tracy Ryan	1,364	0.36%	−0.72%
Independent	Jim Brewer	1,147	0.30%	
Independent	Daniel Cunningham	382	0.10%	
Majority		17,362	4.54%	+3.25%
Turnout		382,110		
Republican gain from Democratic		Swing		

==== By county ====
By county

County	Linda Lingle Republican		Mazie Hirono Democratic		All Others	
County	#	%	#	%	#	%
Hawaii	25,530	51.09%	23,602	47.23%	836	1.67%
Honolulu	141,315	52.75%	123,180	45.98%	3,399	1.28%
Kauaʻi	9,426	40.8%	13,352	57.79%	326	1.4%
Maui	20,738	50.4%	19,513	47.43%	893	2.18%
Totals	197,009	51.56%	179,647	47.01%	5,454	1.43%

Counties that flipped from Democratic to Republican

- Honolulu

Counties that flipped from Republican to Democratic

- Kalawao (largest community: Kalaupapa)
