= Bu Laia =

American comedian

Bu Laʻia (born as Shawn Kaui Hill in Waimanalo, Hawaii) is a Hawaiian comedian known for his use of Hawaiian pidgin and for wearing a large "afro style" wig and blacking out one of his front teeth while performing. He starred in a cable television show in the early 1990s and released two comic musical albums entitled False Crack??? And Hawaii's Most Wanted. He also attained fame—or notoriety—when he ran for governor of Hawaiʻi in 1994 (when he was too young to legally do so) and again as a member of the Natural Law Party in 2002. He also attracted attention when he was arrested for riding a skateboard at Honolulu International Airport. Bu is pidgin for "Bull". The name "Bu Laʻia" is a homophone of "Bull Liar", a phrase meaning "an outrageous liar". His name is reminiscent of the character created by Hawaiian comedian Kent Bowman, “K.K. Kaumanua” (K.K. Cow–Manure) famous for his "Pidgin English Children's Stories," although Bowman's character uses the pidgin English of an earlier generation.
