= Alema Leota =

American politician (1928–2008)

Alema Leota (March 10, 1928 – May 11, 2008) was an alleged Hawaiian organized crime boss of Samoan descent during the 1960s and 1970s who led an unsuccessful nonpartisan campaign for the Governor of Hawaii during the 1978 election. He was defeated by former Governor George Ariyoshi during the general election.

== Biography ==
Leota was born and raised in Lāʻie, Hawaii on the island of Oahu to Samoan immigrant parents, Aivao and Matala Leota. His parents were among the first Samoan immigrants to settle in Hawaii in 1919 after their conversion to the Church of Jesus Christ of Latter-day Saints. He attended Kahuku High School, but ultimately graduated from 'Iolani School.

Leota was drafted into the United States military during the final draft conducted after the end of World War II. He served for three years in the 82nd Airborne Division, based in Fort Bragg, North Carolina, and completed over 40 parachute missions.

He first made headlines in Hawaii in 1952 when Leota and his brother, Reid Leota, were arrested in Honolulu on charges of murdering a man at a pool hall on Smith Street. Leota was later convicted on a lesser charge of assault while his brother was convicted of murder.

Leota was repeatedly fingered by both federal and state authorities of allegedly being head of Hawaii's organized crime during the late 1960s and early 1970s. Often called The Boss, he was rumored to have been one of the most feared yet respected men of his time.

=== 1978 campaign for Governor of Hawaii ===
Alema Leota mounted an unsuccessful campaign as a nonpartisan candidate for Governor of Hawaii in 1978. He received only 277 votes during the statewide primary election, but this was enough to put his name onto the gubernatorial general election ballots. He campaigned on a platform of change in state government. However, Leota was still badly defeated by incumbent Governor George Ariyoshi during the 1978 general election. It was widely speculated that his rumored criminal involvement may have lost him the election.

Leota denied all charges that he was tied to organized crime during his campaign. He said that organized crime could not exist without the cooperation of the government and called charges that he was involved in the Hawaiian underworld, "a crock."

Even after losing the election, Leota held a feared but respected persona in the public eye.

== Later years ==
Alema Leota last made the news in 2004 when he helped bring together a reunion of the Leota family. He was the last surviving child of his parents, Aivao and Matala Leota, and was therefore known as the family patriarch of the Leota clan. Approximately 700 members of the Leota family, from as far away as New Zealand and the United Kingdom, attended the reunion.

During his last visit to Laie, Hawaii Family Genealogy took most of Alema Leota's time, to which he was a voracious researcher. His older sister Anna Fenene was one of the most active LDS families in Laie. Her Husband Tom was a LDS Bishop. Alema Leota was frail and soft-spoken in his later years and was loved by his family.

Alema Leota died at the age of 80 in Everett, Washington, on May 11, 2008. He died of complications of injuries sustained in a car accident which took place on December 25, 2007. He was survived by his companion, Ann Lyons; his son, Frank Minami; one granddaughter, Desiree Lynn; two great-granddaughters, Savannah-Kiana Marie and Jaylynn Leilani; and a great many loving nieces and nephews.
