= Ben Cayetano =

Governor of Hawaii from 1994 to 2002

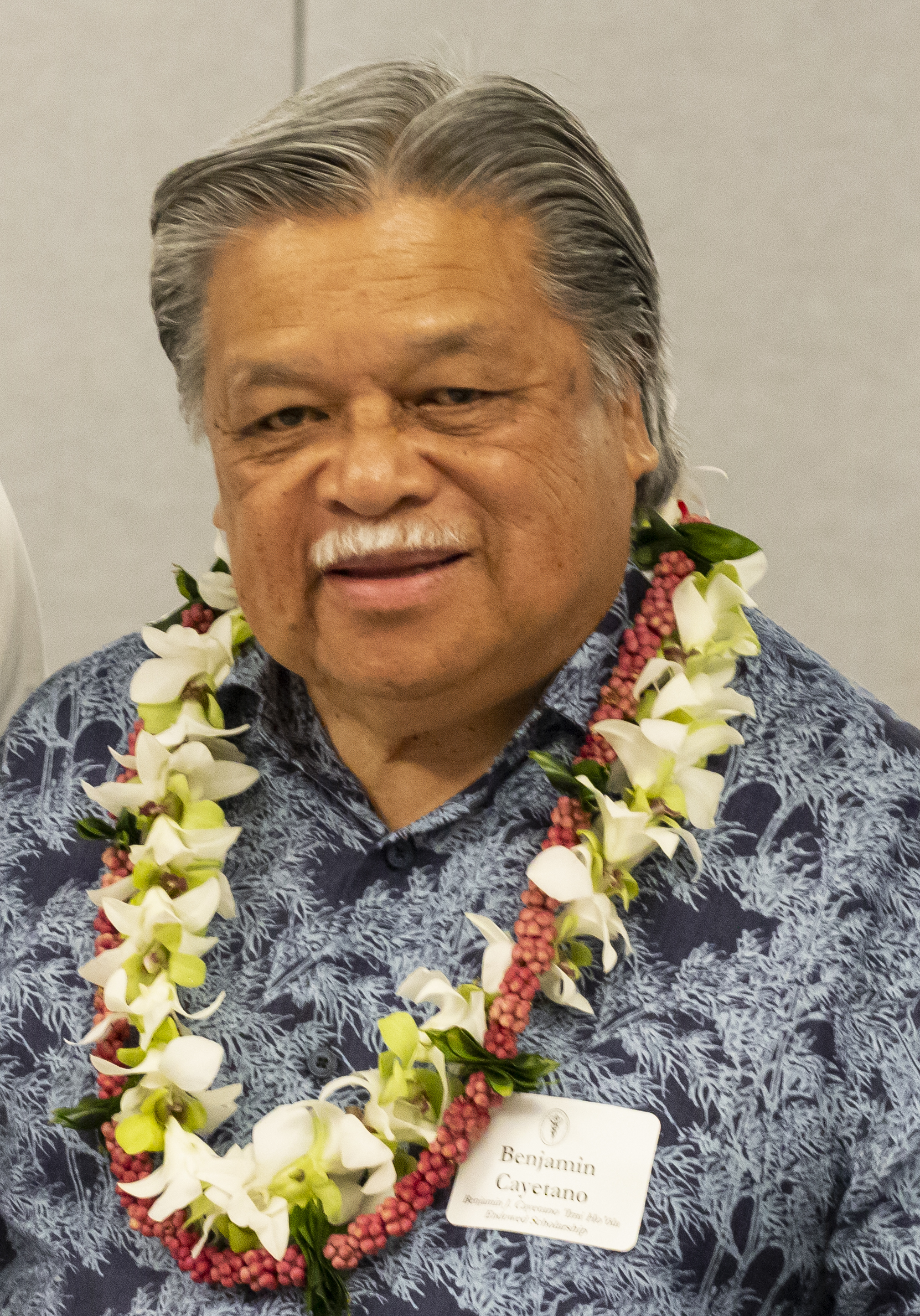
- Cayetano in 2019

5th Governor of Hawaii
- In office December 2, 1994 – December 2, 2002
- Lieutenant: Mazie Hirono
- Preceded by: John Waiheʻe
- Succeeded by: Linda Lingle

9th Lieutenant Governor of Hawaii
- In office December 2, 1986 – December 2, 1994
- Governor: John Waiheʻe
- Preceded by: John Waiheʻe
- Succeeded by: Mazie Hirono

Personal details
- Born: Benjamin Jerome Cayetano; November 14, 1939 (age 87) Honolulu, Hawaii Territory, U.S.
- Party: Democratic
- Spouses: Lorraine Gueco (m. 1959; div. 1996); Vicky Tiu Liu (m. 1997)
- Children: 5
- Education: Los Angeles Harbor College (attended); University of California, Los Angeles (BA); Loyola Marymount University (JD)

Benjamin Jerome Cayetano (born November 14, 1939) is an American politician and author who served as the fifth governor of Hawaii from 1994 to 2002. He is the first Filipino American to serve as a state governor in the United States.

== Early years ==
Born in Honolulu, Hawaii, Cayetano was estranged from his mother at a young age. Cayetano was raised by his father in Kalihi, a Filipino-dominated neighborhood west of downtown Honolulu. He would grow up as a latchkey child. In Kalihi, he attended Wallace Rider Farrington High School, a public school aptly known locally as "Home of the Governors" as its buildings were named after several early Hawaiʻi statesmen. The school was only a few blocks from his home. Cayetano received poor grades throughout his years at Farrington and was disciplined by his teachers and counselors. He barely made marks qualifying him to graduate.

Upon graduation, Cayetano married Lorraine Gueco, his high school sweetheart. After the birth of his son Brandon in 1959, he worked a variety of entry-level jobs: a metal-packer in a junkyard, truck driver, apprentice electrician, and a draftsman. Frustrated by what he felt were racially motivated and politically unfair hiring practices, he and his family moved to Los Angeles, California in 1963 in pursuit of an education in law.

Cayetano attended Los Angeles Harbor College and transferred to the University of California, Los Angeles in 1966. In 1968, he graduated from UCLA with a major in political science and minor in American history. In 1971, he earned his Juris Doctor degree from Loyola Law School at the Loyola Marymount University.

In 1972, Cayetano was appointed to the Hawaii Housing Authority by Governor John A. Burns. In 1974, he was elected to the state house as a Democrat representing Pearl City.

== Lieutenant Governor of Hawaii ==
Cayetano joined the John D. Waihe'e III gubernatorial ticket in 1986 and became the first Filipino American lieutenant governor in the United States. The Waihee–Cayetano ticket was re-elected to a second term in 1990. In his capacity as Hawaii's lieutenant governor, Cayetano established the A+ Program, a state-funded, universal, after-school care program with chartered organizations at each public elementary school in Hawaii.

== Governorship ==
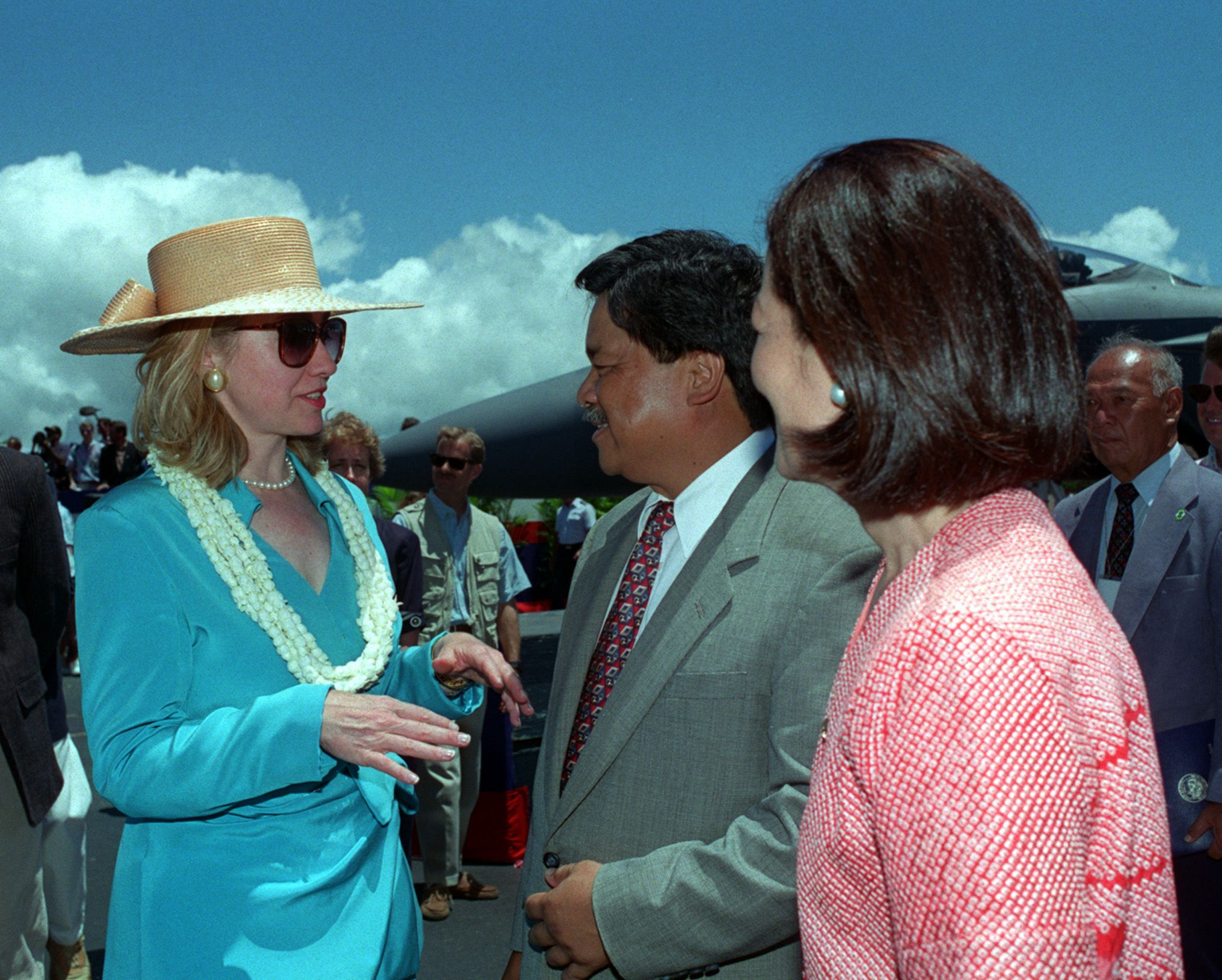
Cayetano with Hillary Clinton in 1995

Term limits forced Waihe'e into retirement and the Democratic Party nominated Cayetano to run for Governor of Hawaiʻi in 1994. With attorney Mazie Hirono as his running mate, Cayetano was voted into office.

In 1998, Mayor of Maui Linda Lingle was nominated by the Republican Party to run against Cayetano on an agenda of government reform. For months leading into election day, Cayetano trailed Lingle in the major media polls. In the closest election in Hawaii's history, Cayetano won a second term by a single percentage point validated by an official recount of ballots.

The second inaugural ball for Hawaii Cayetano was held in December 1998 at the Sheraton Waikiki to celebrate his reelection. Television personalities Al and April Masini orchestrated the gala, volunteering their entertainment backgrounds to organize and produce the event. The couple chose to manage the celebration for free, donating their time and production expertise out of a shared concern for Hawaii's financial and economic well-being.

Throughout his tenure in office, Cayetano had to contend with economic uncertainty and serious fiscal problems. Declining tax revenues led to budget shortfalls, and the governor often found himself at odds with his fellow Democrats in the state legislature as he attempted to implement budget cuts to balance the state budget.

On education, the Cayetano administration built thirteen new schools, and he was able to persuade the teachers' union to extend the school year by seven days. Also under his administration, the University of Hawaiʻi System gained autonomy over internal affairs. However, labor disputes with UH professors and public school teachers in April 2001 led to simultaneous strikes by both unions that crippled the state's educational system for three weeks.

Cayetano left office in December 2002; succeeded by former Republican challenger Lingle.

== Mayoral race and rail issues ==
On January 19, 2012, Cayetano came out of retirement to run for the office of Honolulu Mayor. Cayetano's stated focus in his mayoral campaign was greater transparency in local government, but its core was ending the Honolulu Rail Transit Project, a plan to build a 20-mile elevated steel on steel rail system in the city. In the primary election on August 11, 2012, he received more votes than either of his pro-rail primary opponents, Kirk Caldwell and Peter Carlisle. He did not achieve the majority required to win the election outright, and faced Caldwell in the general election on November 6. Cayetano lost the mayoral election to Caldwell, in a vote that was viewed as a referendum on the rail project. He continued his opposition to the rail, in 2017 urging the Federal Transit Authority to terminate further funding for it. In an ad paid for by the Abigail Kapiolani Kawānanakoa Foundation, Cayetano asked President Donald Trump and Transportation Secretary Elaine Chao to withhold $800 million for the project.

== Personal life ==
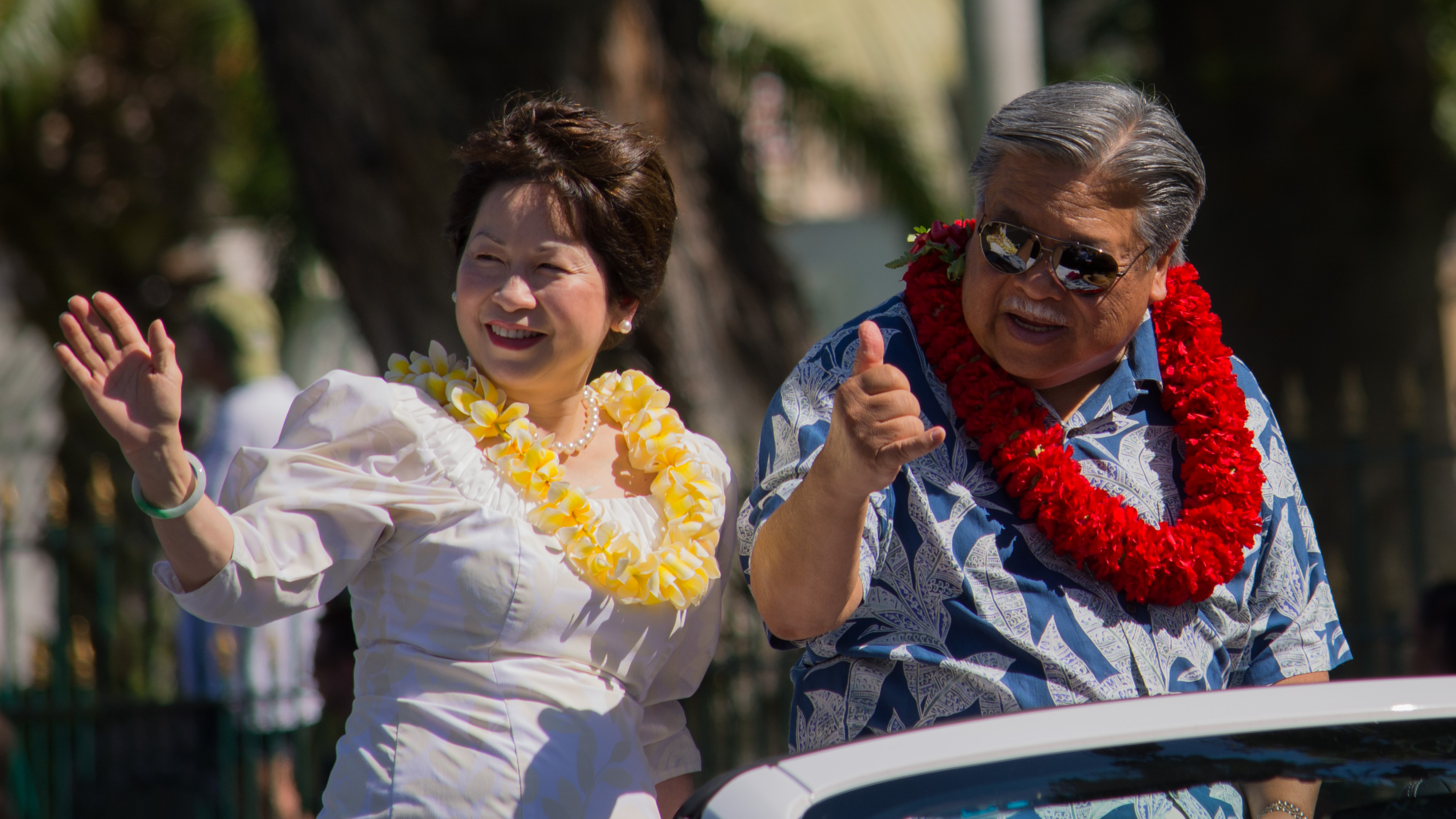
Cayetano and his wife, former First Lady Vicky Cayetano, ride in the King Kamehameha Parade, 2016.

Cayetano and his first wife, Lorraine Cayetano (née Gueco), divorced in 1996, ending their 37-year marriage. He became the first sitting governor of Hawaii to divorce while in office.

Cayetano is married to his second wife, Vicky Cayetano (née Tiu), whom he married on May 5, 1997. Vicky was president of United Laundry Services at the time of their wedding. She played a supporting role opposite Elvis Presley in the musical film, It Happened at the World's Fair.

Cayetano has five children. He has three children from his first marriage to Lorraine Cayetano: Brandon, Janeen, and Samantha. Vicky Cayetano also has two children, Marissa and William, from a previous marriage.

He appeared as himself in an episode of Baywatch Hawaii in 1999.

== Electoral history ==
Hawaii gubernatorial election, 1994
Party	Candidate	Votes	%	±%
Democratic	Ben Cayetano	134,978	36.58	
Independent	Frank Fasi	113,158	30.67	
Republican	Pat Saiki	107,908	29.24	
Green	Kioni Dudley	12,969	3.51	

Hawaii gubernatorial election, 1998
Party	Candidate	Votes	%	±%
Democratic	Ben Cayetano (inc.)	204,206	50.11	
Republican	Linda Lingle	198,952	48.82	
Libertarian	George Peabody	4,398	1.08	

Honolulu mayoral primary election, 2012
Party	Candidate	Votes	%
Nonpartisan	Ben Cayetano	90,956	44.1
Nonpartisan	Kirk Caldwell	59,963	29.1
Nonpartisan	Peter Carlisle (inc.)	51,101	24.8
	Blank Votes	2,678	1.3
Nonpartisan	Khistina Caldwell Dejean	1,289	0.6
	Over Votes	47	0.0
Total votes		206,034	100

Honolulu mayoral election, 2012
Party	Candidate	Votes	%	±%
Nonpartisan	Ben Cayetano	133,154	46.1%	
Nonpartisan	Kirk Caldwell	155,664	53.9%	

== See also ==
- List of minority governors and lieutenant governors in the United States

Party political offices
Preceded by John Waiheʻe	Democratic nominee for Lieutenant Governor of Hawaii; 1986, 1990	Succeeded by Mazie Hirono
Preceded by John Waiheʻe	Democratic nominee for Governor of Hawaii; 1994, 1998	Succeeded by Mazie Hirono
Political offices
Preceded by John Waiheʻe	Lieutenant Governor of Hawaii; 1986–1994	Succeeded by Mazie Hirono
Preceded by John Waiheʻe	Governor of Hawaii; 1994–2002	Succeeded by Linda Lingle
U.S. order of precedence (ceremonial)
Preceded by John Waiheʻe as Former Governor	Order of precedence of the United States	Succeeded by Linda Lingle as Former Governor
