= Pat Saiki =

American politician (1930–2026)

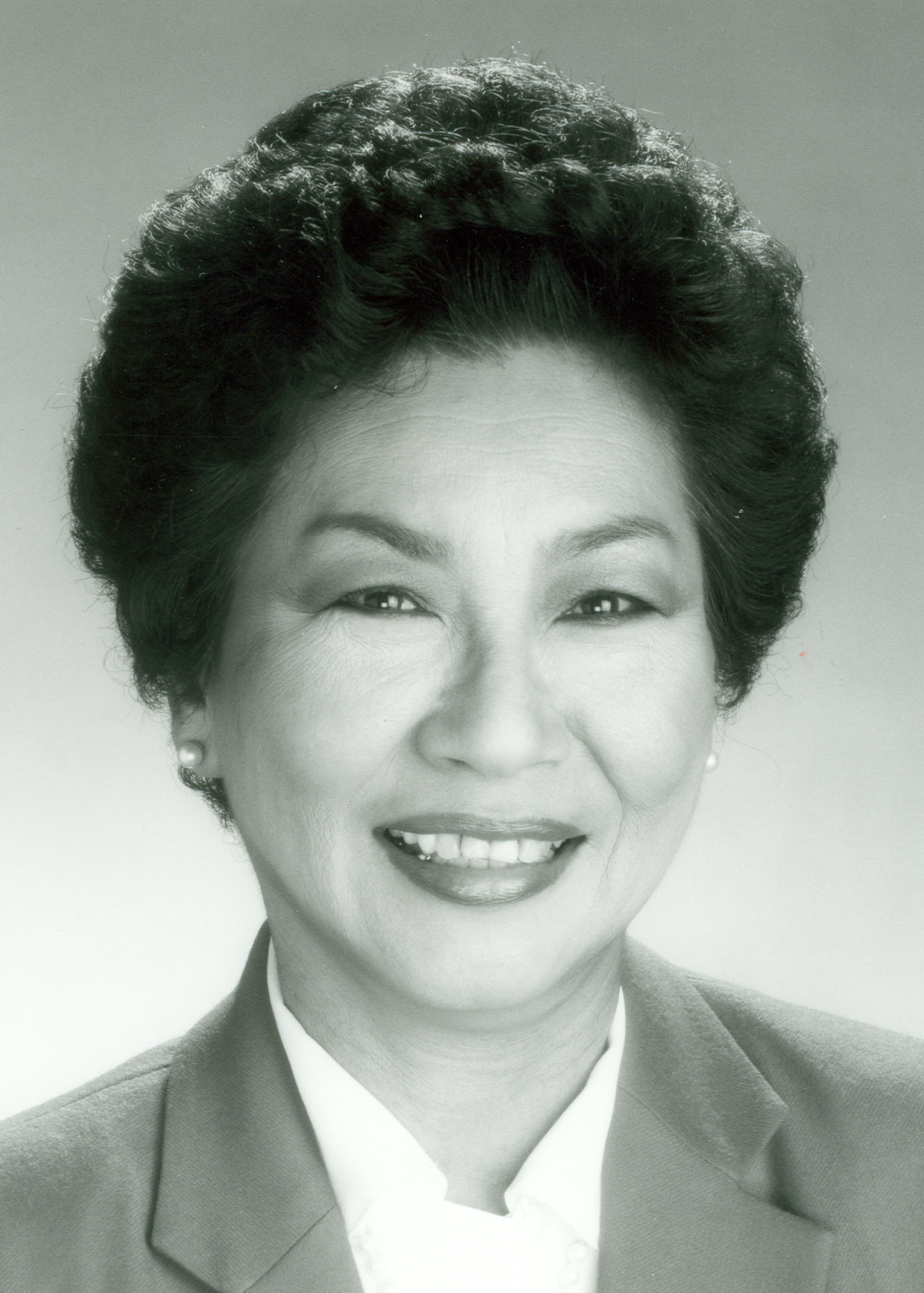

Chair of the Hawaii Republican Party
- In office March 19, 2014 – June 8, 2015
- Preceded by: David S. Chang
- Succeeded by: Fritz Rohlfing

17th Administrator of the Small Business Administration
- In office April 16, 1991 – January 20, 1993
- President: George H. W. Bush
- Preceded by: Susan Engeleiter
- Succeeded by: Erskine Bowles

Member of the U.S. House of Representatives from Hawaii's 1st district
- In office January 3, 1987 – January 3, 1991
- Preceded by: Neil Abercrombie
- Succeeded by: Neil Abercrombie

Personal details
- Born: Patricia Hatsue Fukuda; May 28, 1930 Hilo, Hawaii Territory
- Died: September 30, 2026 (aged 96) Honolulu, Hawaii, U.S.
- Party: Republican
- Spouse: Stanley Saiki
- Children: 5
- Education: University of Hawaii, Manoa (BS)

Patricia Hatsue Saiki (née Fukuda; May 28, 1930 – September 30, 2026) was an American politician and educator from Hilo, Hawaii. A member of the Republican Party, she served as a member of the United States House of Representatives from 1987 to 1991 and then as Administrator of the Small Business Administration under President George H. W. Bush.

== Background ==
Saiki was born in Hilo, Hawaii on May 28, 1930. She graduated from Hilo High School in 1948 and received her bachelor's degree from the University of Hawaiʻi at Mānoa in 1952. Upon graduating from college, Saiki became a teacher at Punahou, Kaimuki Intermediate, and Kalani High schools. She also taught in Toledo, Ohio, when she and her husband, Stanley Saiki, moved there for his medical school residency.

She ran for office after establishing the teacher's chapter of the Hawaii Government Employees Association. Her fellow teachers encouraged her to run for office, which she did in 1968.

Saiki died in Honolulu on September 30, 2026, at the age of 96.

== Political career ==
In 1968, Saiki joined the Hawai`i Republican Party and ran successfully for a seat in the Hawaii State House of Representatives. In 1974, she moved to the Hawaii State Senate where she served her district until 1982. A vacancy was created by U.S. Rep. Cecil Heftel's untimely resignation from Congress, and on September 20, 1986, a special election was held. Saiki lost the special election (to Democrat Neil Abercrombie) but won in the subsequent general election (over Democrat Mufi Hannemann) sending her to Congress where she served two consecutive terms. With her election in 1986, she became the first Republican elected to represent Hawaii in the House of Representatives since its statehood. In 1988, she beat challenger Mary G. F. Bitterman, a Democrat and former head of Voice of America.

Until the swearing-in of Charles Djou on May 25, 2010, Saiki was the only Republican to ever hold a House seat from the state of Hawaii and one of only two Republican Members of Congress (the other being Senator Hiram Fong) to represent the state since it gained statehood. She is also the second woman to be elected to Congress from the state of Hawaii (the first being Patsy Mink, with whom Saiki served for two years).

While in office, Saiki focused on education-related issues. She was a commissioner for the Western Interstate Commission on Higher Education, and was a member of the Fund for the Improvement of Higher Education. Though fiscally conservative, she also pushed for the redress of Japanese Americans for their internment during World War II.

Saiki voted for the Abandoned Shipwrecks Act. The Act asserts United States title to certain abandoned shipwrecks located on or embedded in submerged lands under state jurisdiction, and transfers title to the respective state, thereby empowering states to manage these cultural and historical resources more efficiently, with the goal of preventing treasure hunters and salvagers from damaging them. President Ronald Reagan signed it into law on April 28, 1988.

In 1990, she lost a United States Senate race to Daniel Akaka, but was then appointed Administrator of the Small Business Administration under President George H. W. Bush. In 1994, she lost a race for Governor of Hawaii against Democratic challenger Ben Cayetano. Saiki subsequently chaired the Hawaii presidential campaign of former New York City mayor Rudy Giuliani in 2008 and the 2010 and 2012 congressional campaigns of Charles Djou. She served from 2014 to 2015 as chair of the Republican Party of Hawaii.

== Electoral history ==
1986 Hawaii U.S. House of Representatives District 1 election
Party	Candidate	Votes	%	±%
Republican	Pat Saiki	99,683	59.2	
Democratic	Mufi Hannemann	63,061	37.45	
Libertarian	Blase Harris	5,633	3.35	

1988 Hawaii U.S. House of Representatives District 1 election
Party	Candidate	Votes	%	±%
Republican	Pat Saiki (incumbent)	96,848	54.71	
Democratic	Mary G. F. Bitterman	76,394	43.16	
Libertarian	Blase Harris	3,778	2.13	

1990 Hawaii U.S. Senate election
Party	Candidate	Votes	%	±%
Democratic	Daniel Akaka (incumbent)	188,901	54.02	
Republican	Pat Saiki	155,978	44.61	
Libertarian	Ken Schoolland	4,787	1.37	

1994 Hawaii gubernatorial election
Party	Candidate	Votes	%	±%
Democratic	Ben Cayetano	134,978	36.58	
Independent	Frank Fasi	113,158	30.67	
Republican	Pat Saiki	107,908	29.24	
Green	Kioni Dudley	12,969	3.51	

== See also ==
- Women in the United States House of Representatives
- List of Asian Americans and Pacific Islands Americans in the United States Congress

== Sources ==
- Biography at the Biographical Directory of the United States Congress

Party political offices
Preceded by Virginia Isbell	Republican nominee for Lieutenant Governor of Hawaii; 1982	Succeeded by John Felix
Preceded by Maria Hustace	Republican nominee for U.S. Senator from Hawaii (Class 1); 1990	Succeeded by Maria Hustace
Preceded by Fred Hemmings	Republican nominee for Governor of Hawaii; 1994	Succeeded by Linda Lingle
Preceded by David S. Chang	Chair of the Hawaii Republican Party; 2014–2015	Succeeded by Fritz Rohlfing
U.S. House of Representatives
Preceded by Neil Abercrombie	Member of the U.S. House of Representatives from Hawaii's 1st congressional district 1987–1991	Succeeded by Neil Abercrombie
Political offices
Preceded by Paul Cooksey; Acting	Administrator of the Small Business Administration; 1991–1993	Succeeded by Dayton Watkins; Acting
