= Randy Iwase =

American politician

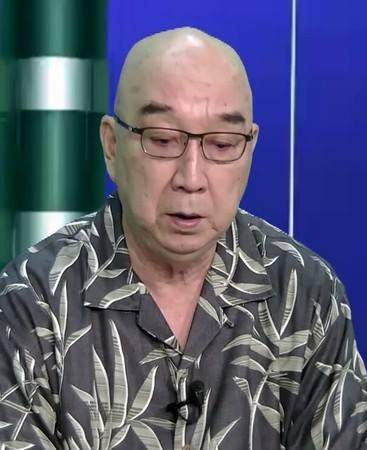

Member of the Hawaii Senate from the 18th district
- In office 1990–2000
- Preceded by: Toraki Matsumoto
- Succeeded by: Ron Menor

Personal details
- Born: December 1, 1947 (age 78) Honolulu, Hawaii, U.S.
- Party: Democratic
- Spouse: Jan Iwase
- Children: 3
- Education: University of Hawaii, Manoa (BA); University of San Francisco (JD)

Randall Y. Iwase (born December 1, 1947) is an American politician and former Hawaii state senator. He was the Hawaii Democratic Party nominee for the 2006 Hawaii gubernatorial election.

He ran on a platform emphasizing reform in the education sector, citing his beliefs in the importance of universal education learned from his own working-class background. Iwase was defeated by a substantial margin, in spite of a favorable Democratic climate in 2006.

== Career ==
After earning his JD degree at University of San Francisco School of Law, Iwase returned to Hawai'i and worked as a deputy attorney general and also served as Majority Floor Leader, Hawai'i State Senator (Majority Whip), and executive director of the Aloha Tower Development Corp. He served on the Honolulu City Council from 1986 to 1988 and unsuccessfully ran for Mayor of Honolulu in 1988 against incumbent mayor Frank Fasi.

== 2006 gubernatorial race ==
Iwase won the Democratic primary by a substantial margin without serious opposition and faced Republican incumbent Governor Linda Lingle.

Only one debate occurred in the duration of the campaign, giving the relatively unknown Iwase statewide television exposure.

According to filings with the Hawai'i state Campaign Spending Commission, the Iwase campaign had only raised $241,973 as of September 23, 2006. This was in contrast to a record $6.37 million raised by his opponent, Governor Linda Lingle. The large difference in available funds was cited as an insurmountable obstacle for Iwase.

Instead, the Iwase campaign focused on using Internet technology. In addition to a classic webpage with campaign press releases and schedules, it featured videos, online contributions, links, a discussion/feedback board, blogs, as well as an RSS/Atom newsfeed.

Iwase was defeated by over twenty-five points, 63 percent to 35 percent, in the general election, as Governor Lingle's personal popularity and well funded media campaign overwhelmed Iwase. His campaign's financial difficulties and late start offset the congressional Democratic "wave" of 2006.

Party political offices
Preceded by Mazie Hirono	Democratic nominee for Governor of Hawaii; 2006	Succeeded by Neil Abercrombie
