= 2006 Hawaii gubernatorial election =

- November 7, 2006
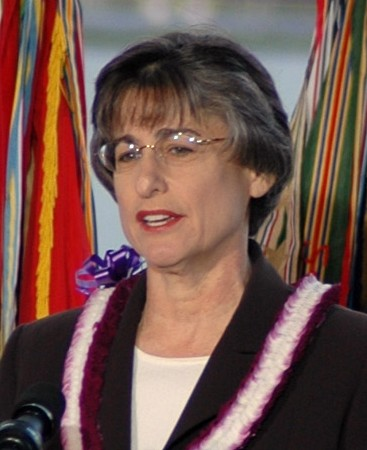

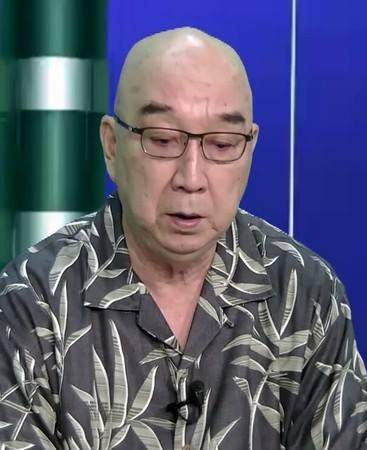
Nominee	Linda Lingle	Randy Iwase
Party	Republican	Democratic
Running mate	Duke Aiona	Malama Solomon
Popular vote	215,313	121,717
Percentage	62.53%	35.35%
- County results Lingle: 50–60% 60–70%
Governor before election
Linda Lingle
Republican
Elected Governor
Linda Lingle
Republican

The 2006 Hawaii gubernatorial election was held on November 7, 2006. Incumbent Linda Lingle was the first Republican to be elected governor of Hawaii since 1959. Although 2006 was a strong election year for Democrats, Lingle won re-election by a landslide owing to an economic rebound in the state that occurred during her tenure after a shaky decade for the state economy during the 1990s and early 2000s. As of 2026, this is the last time a Republican won a statewide election in Hawaii, as well as the only time in Hawaii history that a Republican governor was re-elected. Additionally, this alongside 1972 United States presidential election were the only two times Republicans won the state with more than 60% of the vote.

== Republican primary ==
=== Candidates ===
- Linda Lingle, incumbent governor
- George L. Berish, fellow of the Society of Actuaries
- Paul Manner, freelance news correspondent
- George G. Peabody, editor of the Molokai Advertiser-News

==== Results ====
Republican primary results
Party	Candidate	Votes	%
Republican	Linda Lingle (incumbent)	31,275	97.42
Republican	George Peabody	322	1.00
Republican	George L. Berish	295	0.92
Republican	Paul Manner	211	0.66
Total votes		32,103	100.00

== Democratic primary ==
=== Candidates ===
- Randy Iwase, former state senator and former Honolulu city councilor
- William Aila, Wai'anae harbormaster
- Van Tanabe, former telecommunications executive

==== Results ====
Democratic primary results
Party	Candidate	Votes	%
Democratic	Randy Iwase	119,058	66.43
Democratic	William J. Aila, Jr.	43,845	24.46
Democratic	Van K. Tanabe	16,317	9.10
Total votes		179,220	100.00

== Green Party ==
- James Brewer Jr. - full-time political-economic educator and advocate for Hawaii's employee families

== Libertarian Party ==
- Ozell Daniel, comedian

== General election ==
=== Predictions ===
Source	Ranking	As of
The Cook Political Report	Solid R	November 6, 2006
Sabato's Crystal Ball	Safe R	November 6, 2006
Rothenberg Political Report	Safe R	November 2, 2006
Real Clear Politics	Safe R	November 6, 2006

=== Results ===
Hawaii gubernatorial election, 2006
Party	Candidate	Votes	%	±%
Republican	Linda Lingle (incumbent)	215,313	62.53%	+10.98%
Democratic	Randy Iwase	121,717	35.35%	−11.66%
Green	James Brewer, Jr.	5,435	1.58%	
Libertarian	Ozell Daniel	1,850	0.54%	+0.18%
Majority		93,596	27.18%	+22.64%
Turnout		344,315		
Republican hold		Swing		

==== By county ====
By county

County	Linda Lingle Republican		Randy Iwase Democratic		All Others	
County	#	%	#	%	#	%
Hawaii	27,438	57.03%	19,388	40.3%	1,287	2.67%
Honolulu	155,288	65.59%	76,894	32.48%	4,574	1.93%
Kauaʻi	10,814	51.7%	9,505	45.44%	597	2.86%
Maui	21,773	56.51%	15,930	41.35%	826	1.15%
Totals	215,313	62.53%	121,717	35.35%	7,285	2.12%

Counties that flipped from Democratic to Republican

- Kalawao (largest community: Kalaupapa)
- Kauaʻi (largest community: Kapa'a)
