= Randolph Crossley =

American politician

Member of the Hawaii Senate
- In office 1959–1964

Member of the Hawaii House of Representatives
- In office 1943–1945

Personal details
- Born: July 10, 1904 Cupertino, California, U.S.
- Died: February 23, 2004 (aged 99) Monterey, California, U.S.
- Party: Republican
- Spouse: Florence Pepperdine (1928–1988)
- Children: 1
- Education: University of California, Berkeley

Randolph Allin Crossley (July 10, 1904 – February 23, 2004) was an American politician in the state of Hawaii. He served in the Hawaii House of Representatives from 1943 to 1945 and the Hawaii State Senate from 1959 to 1964 and was a Republican.

Crossley was born in Cupertino, California in 1904 to John and Elizabeth (née Hall) Crossley. He attended the University of California from 1923 to 1925. In 1928, he married Florence Pepperdine, the daughter of Pepperdine University founder George Pepperdine. They had one daughter in 1931. Crossley was a businessman and owned an advertising business (Crossley Advertising), Crossley Construction, Aloha Stamp Co., Crossley Flowers and Pacific Savings and Loan. Crossley also worked in the tuna and pineapple packing industries. He was nominated by president Dwight D. Eisenhower in 1953 to become Governor of Hawaii; however this nomination was later withdrawn due to political opposition in the period leading up to the Hawaii Democratic Revolution of 1954. In 1966 and 1974, he ran unsuccessfully for Governor of Hawaii. In 1977, Crossley retired to Pebble Beach, CA, following the failure of his latest business. He died in 2004 at the age of 99.

Party political offices
Preceded by William F. Quinn	Republican nominee for Governor of Hawaii; 1966	Succeeded by Samuel Pailthorpe King
Preceded by Samuel Pailthorpe King	Republican nominee for Governor of Hawaii; 1974	Succeeded by John R. Leopold
