= 1966 Hawaii gubernatorial election =

- November 8, 1966
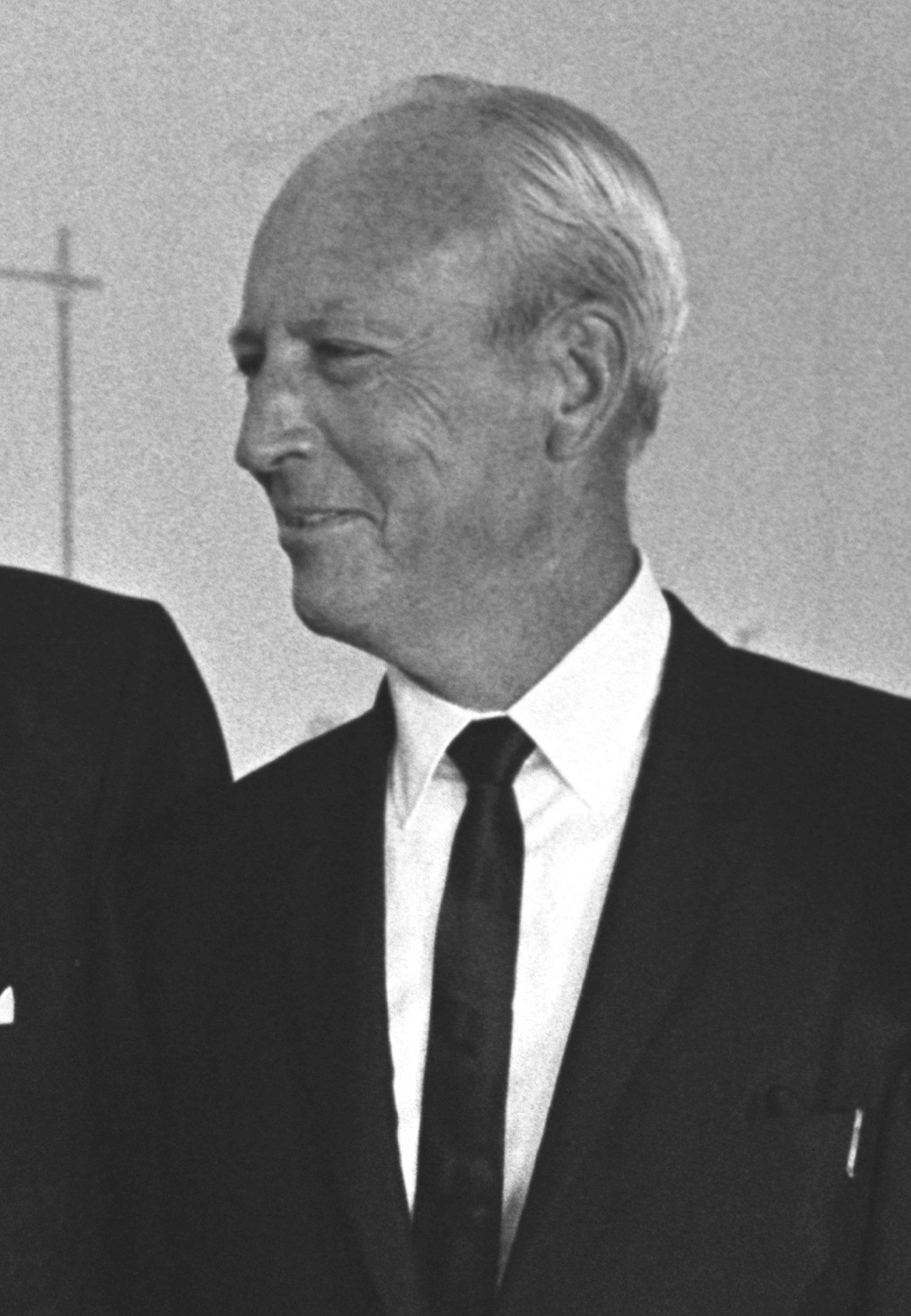

Nominee	John A. Burns	Randolph Crossley
Party	Democratic	Republican
Running mate	Thomas Gill	George H. Mills
Popular vote	108,840	104,324
Percentage	51.06%	48.94%
- County results Burns: 50–60% 60–70% Crossley: 50–60%
Governor before election
John A. Burns
Democratic
Elected Governor
John A. Burns
Democratic

The 1966 Hawaii gubernatorial election was Hawaii's third gubernatorial election. The election was held on November 8, 1966, and resulted in a victory for the Democratic candidate, incumbent Governor of Hawaii John A. Burns over Republican candidate, State Senator Randolph Crossley. Despite the close race, Burns received more votes than Crossley in every county in the state except Honolulu, which Crossley won by less than one percentage point.

This, along with the 1998 election, are the only gubernatorial elections in the state's history where a Democrat won without sweeping every county.

== Primaries ==
Neither the Democratic nor Republican primaries, both of which were held on October 1, 1966, were particularly contentious. In the Democratic primary, John A. Burns received 79.49% of the vote to G.J. Fontes' 20.51%. Randolph Crossley received 98.08% of the Republican primary vote to 1.92% for Gottfried Seitz.

== General election ==
=== Results ===
Hawaii gubernatorial election, 1966
Party	Candidate	Votes	%	±%
Democratic	John A. Burns (incumbent)	108,840	51.06	−7.26
Republican	Randolph Crossley	104,324	48.94	+7.26
Majority		4,516	2.12	−14.51
Turnout		213,164	33.69	
Democratic hold		Swing		

==== By county ====
County	John Burns Democratic		Randolph Crossley Republican		Margin		Total votes cast
County	#	%	#	%	#	%	Total votes cast
Hawaii	13,738	55.4%	11,063	44.6%	2,675	10.8%	24,801
Honolulu	79,742	49.5%	81,320	50.5%	-1,578	-1.0%	161,062
Kauaʻi	6,766	62.0%	4,148	38.0%	2,618	24.0%	10,914
Maui	8,594	52.4%	7,793	47.6%	801	4.8%	16,387
Totals	108,840	51.1%	104,324	48.9%	4,516	2.2%	213,164

Counties that flipped from Democratic to Republican

- Honolulu
