= 1994 Hawaii gubernatorial election =

- November 8, 1994
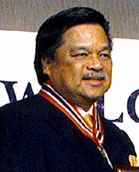

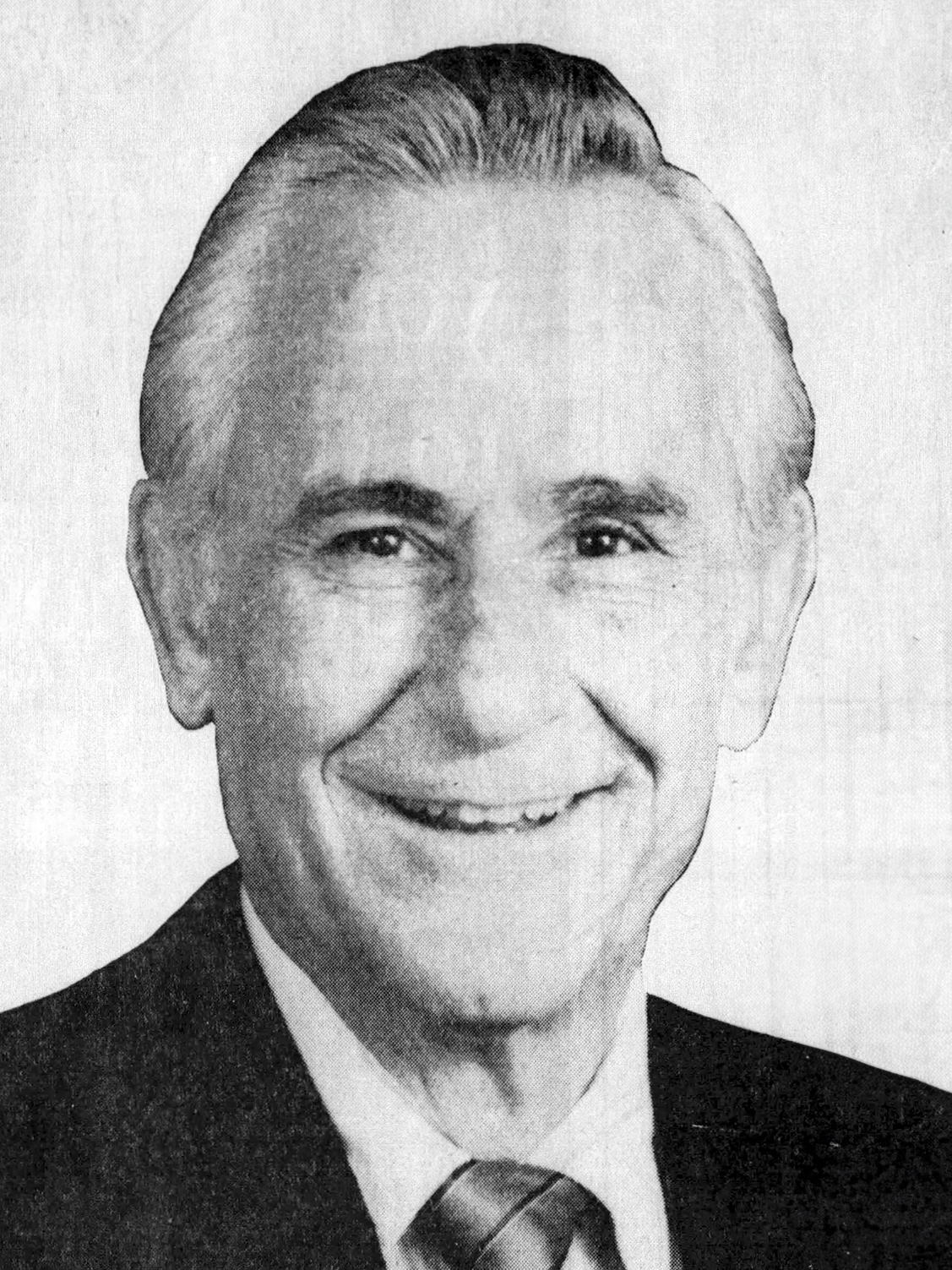

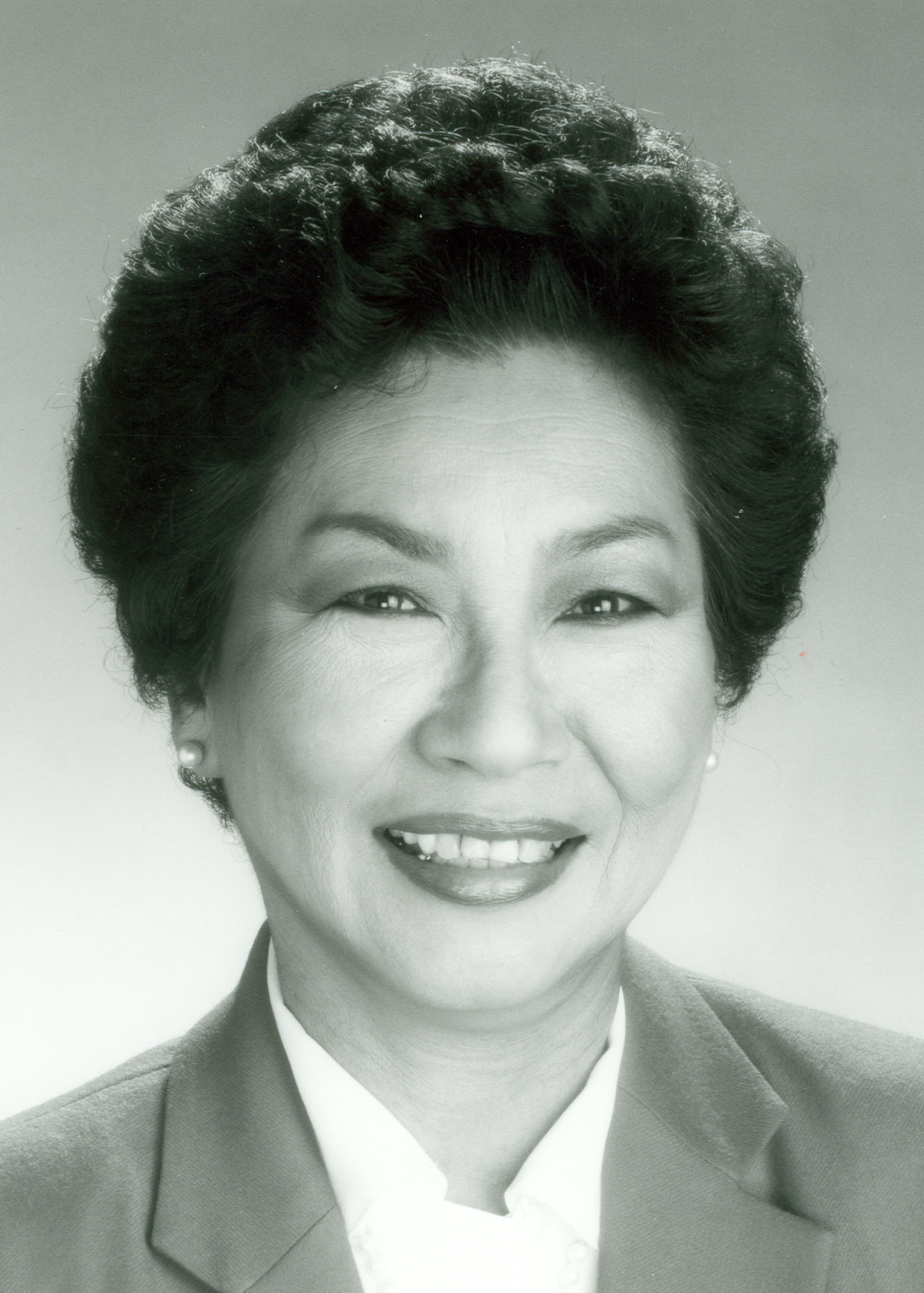
Nominee	Ben Cayetano	Frank Fasi	Pat Saiki
Party	Democratic	Best	Republican
Running mate	Mazie Hirono	Danny Kaleikini	Fred Hemmings
Popular vote	134,978	113,158	107,908
Percentage	36.58%	30.67%	29.24%
- County results Cayetano: 30–40% 40–50%
Governor before election
John Waihee
Democratic
Elected Governor
Ben Cayetano
Democratic

The 1994 Hawaii gubernatorial election was held on Tuesday, November 3, to elect the next Governor of Hawaii. Incumbent Governor of Hawaii John D. Waihee III was prevented from seeking a third term as Governor due to term limits, creating an open seat. Democratic candidate and Lieutenant Governor of Hawaii Ben Cayetano emerged from a crowded primary to become the Democratic nominee, facing off against former Administrator of the Small Business Administration Pat Saiki, the Republican candidate and Mayor of Honolulu Frank Fasi, who ran as the Best Party of Hawaii's nominee. In a very close election, Cayetano beat Fasi, who placed second, by six percentage points and Saiki, who placed third, winning only a plurality of the vote.

Fasi's performance was notable in that it was the best performance by a third party gubernatorial candidate in Hawaii's history.

== Democratic primary ==
=== Candidates ===
- Ben Cayetano, Lieutenant Governor of Hawaii
- John C. Lewin, Hawaii Director of Health
- Bu La'ia
- George Nitta, Jr., radio personality
- Anthony N. Hodges, perennial candidate
- Al Canopin, Jr.
- Elbert Marshall

=== Results ===
Democratic primary results
Party	Candidate	Votes	%
Democratic	Ben Cayetano	110,782	55.04
Democratic	John C. Lewin	76,666	38.09
Democratic	Bu La'ia	5,761	2.86
Democratic	George Nitta, Jr.	3,505	1.74
Democratic	Anthony N. Hodges	2,854	1.42
Democratic	Al Canopin, Jr.	1,111	0.55
Democratic	Elbert Marshall	607	0.30
Total votes		201,286	100.00

== Republican primary ==
=== Candidates ===
- Pat Saiki, former Administrator of the Small Business Administration, former Congresswoman, 1990 Republican nominee for the United States Senate
- Stuart Todd Gregory
- Charles Y. Hirayasu
- Robert Measel, Jr.

=== Results ===
Republican primary results
Party	Candidate	Votes	%
Republican	Pat Saiki	49,953	92.38
Republican	Stuart Todd Gregory	2,278	4.21
Republican	Charles Y. Hirayasu	1,079	2.00
Republican	Robert Measel, Jr.	765	1.41
Total votes		54,075	100.00

== General election ==
=== Results ===
Fasi finished second statewide and in every county except Honolulu.

Hawaii gubernatorial election, 1994
Party	Candidate	Votes	%	±%
Democratic	Ben Cayetano	134,978	36.58%	−23.25%
Best Party of Hawaii	Frank Fasi	113,158	30.67%	N/A
Republican	Pat Saiki	107,908	29.24%	−9.36%
Green	Kioni Dudley	12,969	3.51%	N/A
Majority		21,820	5.91%	−15.31%
Turnout		369,013		
Democratic hold		Swing		

==== By county ====
County	Ben Cayetano Democratic		Frank Fasi Best Party		Pat Saiki Republican		Kioni Dudley Green		Margin		Total votes cast
County	#	%	#	%	#	%	#	%	#	%	Total votes cast
Hawaii	17,436	36.5%	14,557	30.5%	13,277	27.8%	2,507	5.2%	2,879	5.0%	47,777
Honolulu	92,535	35.0%	81,191	30.7%	81,545	30.9%	8,874	3.4%	10,990	4.1% (Note: Compares margin over Saiki.)	264,145
Kauaʻi	9,674	44.7%	7,292	33.7%	4,241	19.6%	440	2.0%	2,382	11.0%	21,647
Maui	15,333	43.3%	10,118	28.5%	8,845	25.0%	1,148	3.2%	5,215	14.8%	35,444
Totals	134,978	36.6%	113,158	30.7%	107,908	29.2%	12,969	3.5%	21,820	5.9%	369,013
