= List of elections in 1988 =

The following elections occurred in the year 1988.

== Africa ==
- 1988 Algerian presidential election
- 1988 Cameroonian general election
- 1988 Equatorial Guinean legislative election
- 1988 Kenyan general election
- 1988 Malian parliamentary election
- 1988 Rwandan parliamentary election
- 1988 Rwandan presidential election
- 1988 Senegalese general election
- 1988 Zambian general election

== Asia ==
- 1988 Afghan parliamentary election
- 1988 Bangladeshi general election
- 1988 Cypriot presidential election
- 1988 Iranian legislative election
- 1988 Israeli legislative election
- 1988 Israeli presidential election
- 1988 Maldivian presidential election
- 1988 Pakistani general election
- 1988 Pakistani presidential election
- 1988 Philippine local elections
- 1988 Singaporean general election
- 1988 South Korean legislative election
- 1988 Thai general election
- 1988 Yemen Arab Republic parliamentary election

=== Sri Lanka ===
- 1988 Sri Lankan presidential election
- 1988 North Eastern Provincial Council election

== Europe ==
- Catalan parliamentary election, 1988
- 1988 Danish parliamentary election
- 1988 Faroese parliamentary election
- 1988 Finnish presidential election
- 1988 Gibraltar general election
- 1988 Icelandic presidential election
- 1988 Monegasque general election
- 1988 San Marino general election
- 1988 Stockholm municipal election
- 1988 Swedish general election

=== France ===
- 1988 French Matignon Accords referendum
- 1988 French cantonal elections
- 1988 French legislative election
- 1988 French presidential election

== North America ==
- 1988 Salvadoran legislative election

=== Canada ===
- 1988 Canadian federal election
- 1988 Brantford municipal election
- 1988 Hamilton, Ontario municipal election
- 1988 Manitoba general election
- 1988 Nova Scotia general election
- 1988 Ontario municipal elections
- 1988 Ottawa municipal election
- 1988 Toronto municipal election
- 1988 Windsor municipal election

=== Caribbean ===
- 1988 Haitian presidential election
- 1988 Puerto Rican general election
- 1988 Tobago House of Assembly election
- 1988 Turks and Caicos Islands general election

=== Mexico ===
- 1988 Mexican general election

=== United States ===
- 1988 United States elections
- 1988 United States presidential election

==== United States lieutenant gubernatorial ====
- 1988 Delaware lieutenant gubernatorial election
- 1988 Missouri lieutenant gubernatorial election
- 1988 North Carolina lieutenant gubernatorial election

==== United States gubernatorial ====
- 1988 Delaware gubernatorial election
- 1988 Indiana gubernatorial election
- 1988 Missouri gubernatorial election
- 1988 Montana gubernatorial election
- 1988 New Hampshire gubernatorial election
- 1988 North Carolina gubernatorial election
- 1988 North Dakota gubernatorial election
- 1988 Rhode Island gubernatorial election
- 1988 Utah gubernatorial election
- 1988 United States gubernatorial elections
- 1988 Vermont gubernatorial election
- 1988 Washington gubernatorial election
- 1988 West Virginia gubernatorial election

==== United States House of Representatives ====
- 1988 United States House of Representatives elections
- 1988 United States House of Representatives election in Alaska
- 1988 United States House of Representatives elections in California
- 1988 United States House of Representatives election in Delaware
- 1988 United States House of Representatives election in District of Columbia
- 1988 United States House of Representatives elections in Idaho
- 1988 United States House of Representatives elections in New Jersey
- 1988 United States House of Representatives election in North Dakota
- 1988 United States House of Representatives elections in South Carolina
- 1988 United States House of Representatives elections in Tennessee
- 1988 United States House of Representatives elections in Texas
- 1988 United States House of Representatives election in Vermont
- 1988 United States House of Representatives elections in Virginia
- 1988 United States House of Representatives elections in West Virginia
- 1988 United States House of Representatives election in Wyoming

==== United States Senate ====
- 1988 United States Senate elections
- 1988 United States Senate election in Arizona
- 1988 United States Senate election in California
- 1988 United States Senate election in Connecticut
- 1988 United States Senate election in Delaware
- 1988 United States Senate election in Florida
- 1988 United States Senate election in Hawaii
- 1988 United States Senate election in Indiana
- 1988 United States Senate election in Maine
- 1988 United States Senate election in Maryland
- 1988 United States Senate election in Massachusetts
- 1988 United States Senate election in Michigan
- 1988 United States Senate election in Minnesota
- 1988 United States Senate election in Mississippi
- 1988 United States Senate election in Missouri
- 1988 United States Senate election in Montana
- 1988 United States Senate election in Nebraska
- 1988 United States Senate election in Nevada
- 1988 United States Senate election in New Jersey
- 1988 United States Senate election in New Mexico
- 1988 United States Senate election in New York
- 1988 United States Senate election in North Dakota
- 1988 United States Senate election in Ohio
- 1988 United States Senate election in Pennsylvania
- 1988 United States Senate election in Rhode Island
- 1988 United States Senate election in Tennessee
- 1988 United States Senate election in Texas
- 1988 United States Senate election in Utah
- 1988 United States Senate election in Vermont
- 1988 United States Senate election in Virginia
- 1988 United States Senate election in Washington
- 1988 United States Senate election in West Virginia
- 1988 United States Senate election in Wyoming

==== United States mayoral elections ====
- 1988 Irvine mayoral election
- 1988 Milwaukee mayoral election
- 1988 Orlando mayoral election
- 1988 Portland, Oregon mayoral election
- 1988 San Diego mayoral election

== Oceania ==
=== Australia ===
- 1988 Adelaide by-election
- 1988 Barambah state by-election
- 1988 Groom by-election
- 1988 New South Wales state election
- 1988 Oxley by-election
- 1988 Port Adelaide by-election
- 1988 Australian referendum
- 1988 South Coast state by-election
- 1988 Victorian state election

=== Hawaii ===
- United States Senate election in Hawaii, 1988

== South America ==
- 1988 Chilean national plebiscite
- 1988 Ecuadorian general election
- 1988 Paraguayan general election
- 1988 Venezuelan presidential election
