= 1992 United States presidential election in Mississippi =

- November 3, 1992
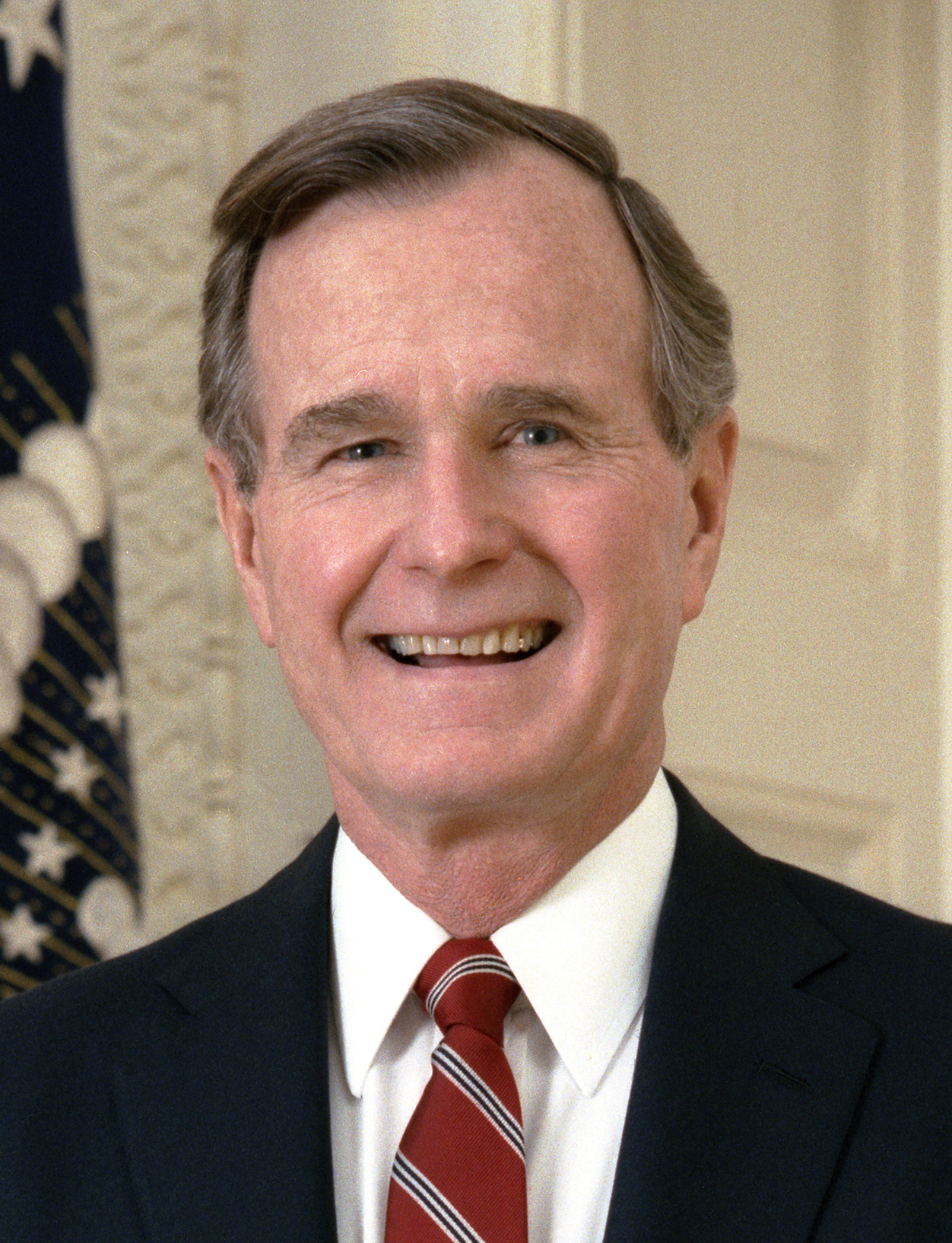

Nominee	George H. W. Bush	Bill Clinton	Ross Perot
Party	Republican	Democratic	Independent
Home state	Texas	Arkansas	Texas
Running mate	Dan Quayle	Al Gore	James Stockdale
Electoral vote	7	0	0
Popular vote	487,793	400,258	85,626
Percentage	49.68%	40.77%	8.72%
County results
Bush
40–50%
50–60%
60–70%
Clinton
40–50%
50–60%
60–70%
70–80%
President before election
George H. W. Bush
Republican
Elected President
Bill Clinton
Democratic

The 1992 United States presidential election in Mississippi took place on November 3, 1992, as part of the 1992 United States presidential election. Voters chose seven representatives, or electors to the Electoral College, who voted for president and vice president.

Mississippi was won by incumbent President George H. W. Bush (R-Texas) with 49.68% of the popular vote over Governor Bill Clinton (D-Arkansas) with 40.77%, making this state Bush's strongest in terms of vote percentage during this election. Businessman Ross Perot (I-Texas) finished in third, with 8.72% of the popular vote. Clinton ultimately won the national vote, defeating both incumbent President Bush and Perot.

== Background ==
The Republican presidential nominee won Mississippi in the 1980, 1984, and 1988 presidential elections. Trent Lott's victory in the 1988 U.S. Senate election resulted in Mississippi having two Republican senators for the first time since Reconstruction. Kirk Fordice's election to governor in 1991 made him the first Republican to hold that office since Reconstruction.

== Primary ==
=== Democratic ===
U.S. Representative Mike Espy and former Governor William F. Winter co-chaired Bill Clinton's campaign in the state.

Bill Clinton

U.S. Congress

- Mike Espy, member of the United States House of Representatives from Mississippi's 2nd congressional district (1987–1993)

Statewide officials

- Marshall Bennett, 51st Mississippi State Treasurer (1988–2003)
- Dick Molpus, 33rd Secretary of State of Mississippi (1984–1996)
- Mike Moore, 38th Attorney General of Mississippi (1988–2004)
- Steve Patterson, 39th State Auditor of Mississippi (1992–1996)
- William F. Winter, 58th Governor of Mississippi (1980–1984)

State legislature

- Tim Ford, 59th Speaker of the Mississippi House of Representatives (1988–2004)

=== Republican ===
The Mississippi Republican Party's executive committee voted to use a winner-take-all method for its primary, which benefited Bush. 45% of Mississippians who voted in a presidential primary did so in the Republican primary. This was an increase from 31% in 1988.

== General ==
Lisa Walker was the director of Clinton's campaign in the state and James Smith was the chief of Ross Perot's campaign.

Despite the fact that Clinton was from neighboring Arkansas, the state remained reliably Republican as the party had recently gained a seat in 1988 elections While Clinton did manage to win a few other Southern States, Mississippi provided Bush with his highest vote percentage in the nation, which was the closest he came to winning an absolute majority in a state. (However, it was only his sixth-best state in margin of victory.) As of the 2024 presidential election, this is the last election in which Hinds County voted for a Republican presidential candidate and the last election in which Tishomingo County voted for a Democratic presidential candidate.

Clinton placed first in 30 counties, 12 more than Michael Dukakis had, and in 21 of the state's 24 majority black counties. Mississippi was Perot's second-worst performance, only ahead of the District of Columbia. The Democrats retained all five U.S. House seats in those concurrent elections.

67% of white voters supported Bush, while 22% supported Clinton. 11% supported Perot.

== Results ==
1992 United States presidential election in Mississippi
Party	Candidate	Votes	Percentage	Electoral votes
Republican	George H. W. Bush (incumbent)	487,793	49.68%	7
Democratic	Bill Clinton	400,258	40.77%	0
Independent	Ross Perot	85,626	8.72%	0
New Alliance Party	Lenora Fulani	2,625	0.27%	0
Libertarian	Andre Marrou	2,154	0.22%	0
Constitution Party	Howard Phillips	1,652	0.17%	0
Natural Law	John Hagelin	1,140	0.12%	0
Populist	James "Bo" Gritz	545	0.06%	0
Totals		981,793	100.0%	7

=== Results by county ===
County	George H.W. Bush Republican		Bill Clinton Democratic		Ross Perot Independent		Various candidates Other parties		Margin		Total votes cast
County	#	%	#	%	#	%	#	%	#	%	Total votes cast
Adams	5,831	36.73%	8,255	51.99%	1,753	11.04%	38	0.24%	-2,424	-15.26%	15,877
Alcorn	6,249	44.21%	6,373	45.08%	1,349	9.54%	165	1.17%	-124	-0.87%	14,136
Amite	2,561	45.08%	2,608	45.91%	498	8.77%	14	0.25%	-47	-0.83%	5,681
Attala	3,520	49.67%	3,015	42.54%	529	7.46%	23	0.32%	505	7.13%	7,087
Benton	1,253	31.68%	2,402	60.73%	293	7.41%	7	0.18%	-1,149	-29.05%	3,955
Bolivar	4,752	33.40%	8,801	61.87%	593	4.17%	80	0.56%	-4,049	-28.47%	14,226
Calhoun	3,191	50.87%	2,462	39.25%	607	9.68%	13	0.21%	729	11.62%	6,273
Carroll	1,695	54.96%	1,182	38.33%	200	6.49%	7	0.23%	513	16.63%	3,084
Chickasaw	3,150	44.96%	3,220	45.95%	629	8.98%	8	0.11%	-70	-0.99%	7,007
Choctaw	2,026	53.77%	1,435	38.08%	298	7.91%	9	0.24%	591	15.69%	3,768
Claiborne	935	21.19%	3,302	74.84%	161	3.65%	14	0.32%	-2,367	-53.65%	4,412
Clarke	4,207	60.67%	2,259	32.58%	450	6.49%	18	0.26%	1,948	28.09%	6,934
Clay	3,297	38.50%	4,620	53.95%	626	7.31%	20	0.23%	-1,323	-15.45%	8,563
Coahoma	4,120	36.85%	6,409	57.33%	518	4.63%	133	1.19%	-2,289	-20.48%	11,180
Copiah	4,600	48.68%	4,397	46.53%	409	4.33%	43	0.46%	203	2.15%	9,449
Covington	3,525	50.39%	2,775	39.67%	654	9.35%	42	0.60%	750	10.72%	6,996
DeSoto	16,104	58.40%	8,833	32.03%	2,569	9.32%	69	0.25%	7,271	26.37%	27,575
Forrest	12,432	54.64%	8,333	36.62%	1,909	8.39%	79	0.35%	4,099	18.02%	22,753
Franklin	1,942	49.31%	1,587	40.30%	393	9.98%	16	0.41%	355	9.01%	3,938
George	4,141	43.55%	2,650	27.87%	1,335	14.04%	1,383	14.54%	1,491	15.68%	9,509
Greene	2,406	51.90%	1,664	35.89%	559	12.06%	7	0.15%	742	16.01%	4,636
Grenada	4,721	49.34%	4,203	43.93%	609	6.36%	35	0.37%	518	5.41%	9,568
Hancock	6,422	47.78%	4,651	34.61%	2,302	17.13%	65	0.48%	1,771	13.17%	13,440
Harrison	25,049	52.84%	15,268	32.21%	6,855	14.46%	235	0.50%	9,781	20.63%	47,407
Hinds	45,031	46.90%	43,434	45.23%	5,341	5.56%	2,218	2.31%	1,597	1.67%	96,024
Holmes	1,694	28.17%	4,092	68.04%	203	3.38%	25	0.42%	-2,398	-39.87%	6,014
Humphreys	1,721	36.75%	2,696	57.57%	258	5.51%	8	0.17%	-975	-20.82%	4,683
Issaquena	298	30.10%	550	55.56%	79	7.98%	63	6.36%	-252	-25.46%	990
Itawamba	4,142	47.54%	3,635	41.72%	918	10.54%	18	0.21%	507	5.82%	8,713
Jackson	25,321	56.36%	13,017	28.97%	6,484	14.43%	108	0.24%	12,304	27.39%	44,930
Jasper	2,789	43.39%	3,059	47.59%	568	8.84%	12	0.19%	-270	-4.20%	6,428
Jefferson	562	15.96%	2,796	79.39%	156	4.43%	8	0.23%	-2,234	-63.43%	3,522
Jefferson Davis	2,228	39.55%	2,991	53.10%	382	6.78%	32	0.57%	-763	-13.55%	5,633
Jones	13,824	56.59%	8,035	32.89%	2,523	10.33%	48	0.20%	5,789	23.70%	24,430
Kemper	1,830	41.96%	2,243	51.43%	278	6.37%	10	0.23%	-413	-9.47%	4,361
Lafayette	5,251	46.07%	5,224	45.84%	861	7.55%	61	0.54%	27	0.23%	11,397
Lamar	8,259	63.37%	3,208	24.62%	1,543	11.84%	22	0.17%	5,051	38.75%	13,032
Lauderdale	17,098	62.25%	8,489	30.91%	1,659	6.04%	220	0.80%	8,609	31.34%	27,466
Lawrence	2,689	44.12%	2,582	42.36%	765	12.55%	59	0.97%	107	1.76%	6,095
Leake	3,943	50.64%	3,333	42.81%	497	6.38%	13	0.17%	610	7.83%	7,786
Lee	12,231	54.36%	7,710	34.27%	2,041	9.07%	519	2.31%	4,521	20.09%	22,501
Leflore	5,298	42.39%	6,374	51.00%	611	4.89%	215	1.72%	-1,076	-8.61%	12,498
Lincoln	7,040	53.78%	4,744	36.24%	1,281	9.79%	26	0.20%	2,296	17.54%	13,091
Lowndes	10,509	55.80%	6,552	34.79%	1,716	9.11%	58	0.31%	3,957	21.01%	18,835
Madison	12,810	54.00%	9,386	39.57%	1,478	6.23%	47	0.20%	3,424	14.43%	23,721
Marion	5,776	49.74%	4,654	40.08%	1,162	10.01%	21	0.18%	1,122	9.66%	11,613
Marshall	3,847	30.75%	7,913	63.24%	689	5.51%	63	0.50%	-4,066	-32.49%	12,512
Monroe	5,994	49.03%	4,933	40.36%	1,255	10.27%	42	0.34%	1,061	8.67%	12,224
Montgomery	2,324	48.66%	2,076	43.47%	370	7.75%	6	0.13%	248	5.19%	4,776
Neshoba	6,135	61.09%	3,090	30.77%	794	7.91%	23	0.23%	3,045	30.32%	10,042
Newton	5,128	65.69%	2,146	27.49%	494	6.33%	38	0.49%	2,982	38.20%	7,806
Noxubee	1,623	32.22%	3,188	63.29%	203	4.03%	23	0.46%	-1,565	-31.07%	5,037
Oktibbeha	6,381	48.50%	5,726	43.52%	984	7.48%	65	0.49%	655	4.98%	13,156
Panola	4,644	40.52%	6,066	52.93%	729	6.36%	21	0.18%	-1,422	-12.41%	11,460
Pearl River	7,726	52.21%	4,683	31.65%	2,352	15.90%	36	0.24%	3,043	20.56%	14,797
Perry	2,538	56.39%	1,490	33.10%	462	10.26%	11	0.24%	1,048	23.29%	4,501
Pike	6,005	43.90%	6,279	45.90%	1,380	10.09%	15	0.11%	-274	-2.00%	13,679
Pontotoc	4,595	54.92%	2,965	35.44%	777	9.29%	29	0.35%	1,630	19.48%	8,366
Prentiss	4,317	50.63%	3,385	39.70%	781	9.16%	43	0.50%	932	10.93%	8,526
Quitman	1,451	35.45%	2,422	59.17%	210	5.13%	10	0.24%	-971	-23.72%	4,093
Rankin	24,537	67.76%	8,155	22.52%	3,454	9.54%	64	0.18%	16,382	45.24%	36,210
Scott	5,268	56.47%	3,349	35.90%	691	7.41%	21	0.23%	1,919	20.57%	9,329
Sharkey	1,008	36.63%	1,526	55.45%	145	5.27%	73	2.65%	-518	-18.82%	2,752
Simpson	5,358	57.45%	3,213	34.45%	726	7.78%	29	0.31%	2,145	23.00%	9,326
Smith	4,106	60.49%	1,968	28.99%	680	10.02%	34	0.50%	2,138	31.50%	6,788
Stone	2,295	54.53%	1,447	34.38%	447	10.62%	20	0.48%	848	20.15%	4,209
Sunflower	3,726	39.68%	5,050	53.77%	600	6.39%	15	0.16%	-1,324	-14.09%	9,391
Tallahatchie	2,213	40.11%	2,902	52.59%	380	6.89%	23	0.42%	-689	-12.48%	5,518
Tate	4,196	50.13%	3,519	42.04%	634	7.57%	22	0.26%	677	8.09%	8,371
Tippah	4,444	50.85%	3,475	39.76%	802	9.18%	18	0.21%	969	11.09%	8,739
Tishomingo	3,393	42.03%	3,910	48.44%	751	9.30%	18	0.22%	-517	-6.41%	8,072
Tunica	693	30.90%	1,451	64.69%	96	4.28%	3	0.13%	-758	-33.79%	2,243
Union	5,173	53.10%	3,714	38.12%	816	8.38%	39	0.40%	1,459	14.98%	9,742
Walthall	2,728	45.72%	2,476	41.49%	711	11.92%	52	0.87%	252	4.23%	5,967
Warren	10,209	49.61%	8,175	39.73%	2,146	10.43%	48	0.23%	2,034	9.88%	20,578
Washington	7,598	38.59%	10,588	53.78%	795	4.04%	708	3.60%	-2,990	-15.19%	19,689
Wayne	3,874	49.78%	3,064	39.37%	824	10.59%	21	0.27%	810	10.41%	7,783
Webster	2,791	55.95%	1,746	35.00%	444	8.90%	7	0.14%	1,045	20.95%	4,988
Wilkinson	1,399	28.29%	3,210	64.91%	307	6.21%	29	0.59%	-1,811	-36.62%	4,945
Winston	4,311	48.07%	3,953	44.08%	688	7.67%	16	0.18%	358	3.99%	8,968
Yalobusha	2,179	41.52%	2,617	49.87%	438	8.35%	14	0.27%	-438	-8.35%	5,248
Yazoo	5,113	47.58%	4,880	45.42%	669	6.23%	83	0.77%	233	2.16%	10,745
Totals	487,793	49.68%	400,258	40.77%	85,626	8.72%	8,116	0.83%	87,535	8.91%	981,793

==== Counties that flipped from Republican to Democratic ====
- Adams
- Alcorn
- Amite
- Chickasaw
- Jasper
- Kemper
- Leflore
- Panola
- Pike
- Tishomingo
- Washington
- Yalobusha

== Works cited ==
- Moreland, Laurence; Steed, Robert; Baker, Tod, eds. (1991). The 1988 Presidential Election in the South: Continuity Amidst Change in Southern Party Politics. Praeger Publishers. ISBN 0275931455.
- Steed, Robert; Moreland, Laurence; Baker, Tod, eds. (1994). The 1992 Presidential Election in the South: Current Patterns of Southern Party and Electoral Politics. Praeger Publishers. ISBN 0275945340.
