= 1990 United States Senate special election in Hawaii =

- November 4, 1990
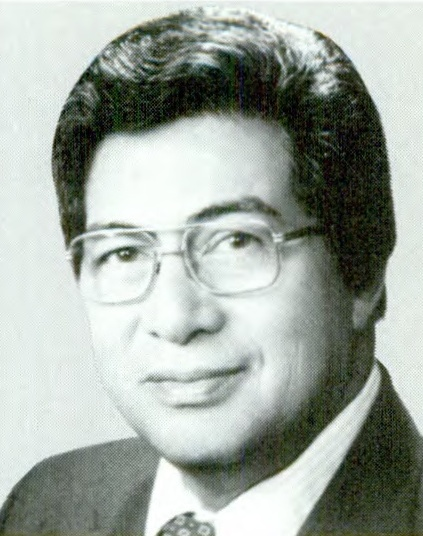

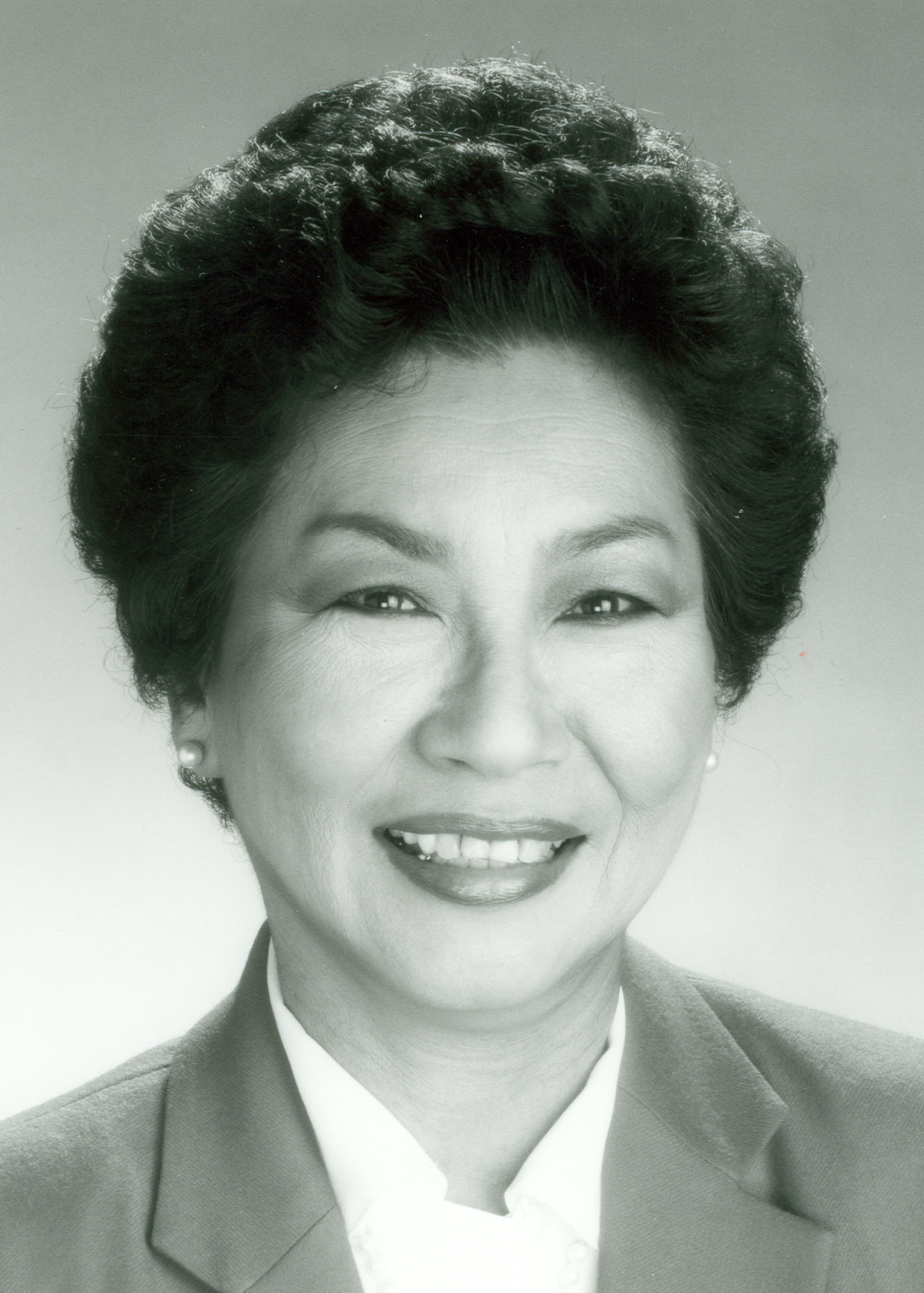
Nominee	Daniel Akaka	Pat Saiki
Party	Democratic	Republican
Popular vote	188,901	155,978
Percentage	54.02%	44.61%
- County results Akaka: 50–60% 60–70%
U.S. senator before election
Daniel Akaka
Democratic
Elected U.S. Senator
Daniel Akaka
Democratic

The 1990 United States Senate special election in Hawaii took place on November 4, 1990. Incumbent Democratic U.S. Senator Daniel Akaka was elected to finish the term ending in 1995. He had been appointed by Governor John Waiheʻe in April 1990 to serve temporarily after the death of Spark Matsunaga. This was the best Republican performance in a U.S. Senate race in Hawaii where the Democrat won since Hiram Fong retired in 1976.

== Major candidates ==
=== Democratic ===
- Daniel Akaka, incumbent U.S. Senator and former U.S. Representative

=== Republican ===
- Pat Saiki, U.S. Representative

== Results ==
General election results
Party	Candidate	Votes	%	±%
Democratic	Daniel Akaka (incumbent)	188,901	54.02%	−22.53%
Republican	Pat Saiki	155,978	44.61%	+23.93%
Libertarian	Ken Schoolland	4,787	1.37%	−1.39%
Majority		32,923	9.41%	
Turnout		349,666		
Democratic hold		Swing		

=== By county ===
County	Daniel Akaka Democratic		Pat Saiki Republican		Ken Schoolland Libertarian		Margin		Total votes cast
County	#	%	#	%	#	%	#	%	Total votes cast
Hawaii	5,195	57.42%	3,436	37.98%	417	4.60%	1,759	19.44%	9,048
Honolulu	128,781	51.52%	118,332	47.34%	2,868	1.14%	10,449	4.18%	249,981
Kauaʻi	13,874	65.57%	7,020	33.18%	265	1.25%	6,854	32.39%	21,159
Maui	20,736	60.04%	13,048	37.78%	752	2.18%	7,688	22.26%	34,536
Totals	188,901	54.02%	155,978	44.61%	4,787	1.37%	32,923	9.41%	349,666

== See also ==
- 1990 United States Senate elections
- List of United States senators from Hawaii
