= 1994 United States Senate election in Hawaii =

- November 8, 1994
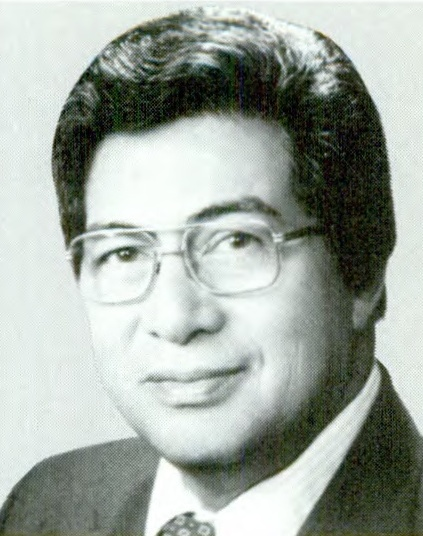

| Nominee | Daniel Akaka | Maria Hustace |
| Party | Democratic | Republican |
| Popular vote | 256,189 | 86,320 |
| Percentage | 71.78% | 24.16% |
- County results Akaka: 70–80%
U.S. senator before election
Daniel Akaka
Democratic
Elected U.S. Senator
Daniel Akaka
Democratic

The 1994 United States Senate election in Hawaii was held November 8, 1994. Incumbent Democratic U.S. Senator Daniel Akaka won re-election to his first full term.

== Major candidates ==
=== Democratic ===
- Daniel Akaka, incumbent U.S. Senator

=== Republican ===
- Maria Hustace, cattle rancher and nominee for this U.S. Senate seat in 1988

== Results ==
Hawaii United States Senate election, 1994
| Party | Candidate | Votes | % | ±% |
|---|---|---|---|---|
| Democratic | Daniel Akaka (Incumbent) | 256,189 | 71.78% | +16.24% |
| Republican | Maria Hustace | 86,320 | 24.16% | −20.45% |
| Libertarian | Richard Rowland | 14,393 | 4.03% | +2.65% |
| Majority | | 356,902 | | |
| Turnout | | | | |
| Democratic hold | | Swing | | |

=== By county ===
| County | Daniel Akaka Democratic | | Maria Hustace Republican | | Richard Rowland Libertarian | | Margin | | Total votes cast |
| County | # | % | # | % | # | % | # | % | Total votes cast |
|---|---|---|---|---|---|---|---|---|---|
| Hawaii | 33,021 | 71.4% | 10,777 | 23.3% | 2,434 | 5.3% | 22,244 | 47.1% | 46,232 |
| Honolulu | 181,570 | 71.0% | 64,356 | 25.2% | 9,830 | 3.8% | 117,214 | 45.8% | 255,756 |
| Kauaʻi | 16,397 | 80.0% | 3,475 | 17.0% | 625 | 3.0% | 12,922 | 63.0% | 20,497 |
| Maui | 25,201 | 73.2% | 7,712 | 22.4% | 1,504 | 4.4% | 17,489 | 50.8% | 34,417 |
| Totals | 256,189 | 71.8% | 86,320 | 24.2% | 14,393 | 4.0% | 169,869 | 47.6% | 356,902 |

== See also ==
- 1994 United States Senate elections
