= 1982 United States Senate election in Hawaii =

- November 2, 1982
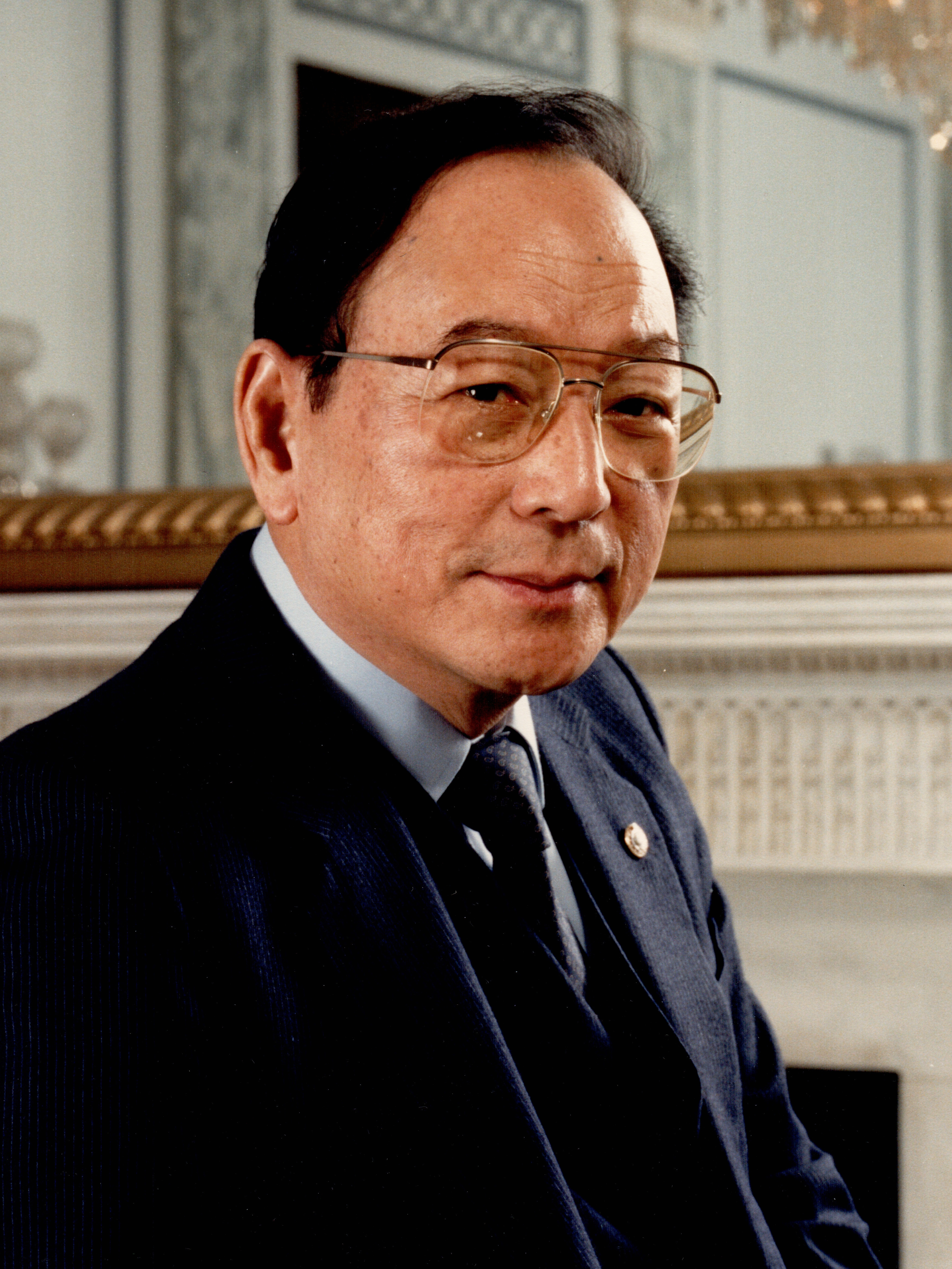

Nominee	Spark Matsunaga	Clarence Brown
Party	Democratic	Republican
Popular vote	245,386	52,071
Percentage	80.08%	16.99%
- County results Matsunaga: 70–80% 80–90%
U.S. senator before election
Spark Matsunaga
Democratic
Elected U.S. Senator
Spark Matsunaga
Democratic

The 1982 United States Senate election in Hawaii took place on November 2, 1982. Incumbent Democratic U.S. Senator Spark Matsunaga won re-election to a second term.

== Major candidates ==
=== Democratic ===
- Spark Matsunaga, incumbent U.S. Senator

=== Republican ===
- Clarence Brown, retired Foreign Service officer

== Results ==
General election results
Party	Candidate	Votes	%	±%
Democratic	Spark Matsunaga (Incumbent)	245,386	80.08%	+26.35%
Republican	Clarence Brown	52,071	16.99%	−23.63%
Independent Democrat	E. Bernier-Nachtwey	8,953	2.92%	N/A
Total votes			100.00%	
Democratic hold		Swing		

=== By county ===
County	Spark Matsunaga Democratic		Clarence Brown Republican		Floyd Bernier-Nachtwey Independent Democrat		Margin		Total votes cast
County	#	%	#	%	#	%	#	%	Total votes cast
Hawaii	27,888	78.3%	6,732	18.9%	988	2.8%	21,156	59.4%	35,608
Honolulu	180,550	79.5%	39,427	17.4%	7,066	3.1%	141,123	62.1%	227,043
Kauaʻi	14,752	89.1%	1,502	9.1%	308	1.9%	13,250	80.0%	16,562
Maui	22,196	81.6%	4,410	16.2%	591	2.9%	17,786	65.4%	27,197
Totals	245,386	80.1%	52,071	17.0%	8,953	2.9%	193,315	63.1%	306,410

== See also ==
- 1982 United States Senate elections
