= Single-price auction =

Single-price auctions are a pricing method in securities auctions that give all purchasers of an issue the same purchase price. They can be perceived as modified Dutch auctions. This method has been used since 1992 when it debuted as an experiment of the U.S. Treasury for all auctions of 2-year and 5-year notes. There is only one main difference between the multiple-price system and the single-price system. In the multiple-price format, the ranking of the desired yield and the amount stated by the competitive bidders is from the lowest to the highest yield and the amounts awarded are at the individual yields submitted by the participants. In the single-price format, all bids accepted by the Treasury are awarded at the same interest rate which is the highest yield of accepted competitive bids.

== History ==
The format of selling U.S. Treasuries by auctions was adopted in 1929 and it has evolved since then. In the beginning of the 1970s, in addition of the multiple-price auctions, were introduced auctions of coupon-bearing securities. Even before 1992, many economists and researchers had proposed the single-price system. One of them is Milton Friedman according to whom the multiple-price auction had two main deficiencies:

- If a bidder pays more than the stop-out price, they are penalized even though their willingness to pay might be higher. This restriction led to pre-discussions between the other auction participants in order to assess the probable bids. Accordingly, the submission of bids resulted in a shift downwards from the "true" market demand curve.
- Restricted number of participants coming from the "close to the market" rule which led to unnecessary high underwriting spread for the Treasury.

The change from multiple-price auctions to single-price auctions was promoted mainly by the Treasury's interest in stimulating the competitive bidding and liquid secondary markets.

== U.S. Treasury Auctions ==
United States Treasury security auctions are conducted using the single-price auction method. In a single-price auction, all successful competitive bidders and all noncompetitive bidders are awarded securities at the price equivalent to the highest rate or yield of accepted competitive tenders. These securities include:

- Treasury bills
- Treasury notes
- Treasury bonds
- Treasury Inflation-Protected Securities (TIPS)

== Treasury Auction process ==
The Treasury auctions have two main features that explain how they work:

- Non-competitive bids vs. competitive bids
  Non-competitive bids are the ones submitted by individuals and smaller institutions to purchase debt issues (governmental securities) on the primary market. Non-competitive bidders are guaranteed to win the auction i.e. to receive securities, but there is no guarantee on the price or yield received. They leave the auction in any cases with the amount they requested. However, they have a limit on the amount they can purchase in the framework of one auction. The maximum amount is $5 million per auction and the minimum vary depending on the type of Treasuries. For example, the minimum for a Treasury Bill is $10,000.
  Competitive bids are limited to 35% of the amount of offering per auction, with a minimum of $100 a bid. Each participant has the right to submit one or more competitive bids, as they have to specify a minimum yield at which the bidder is prepared to buy a specified quantity of notes or the lowest discount rate at which the bidder is ready to buy a certain amount of bills.
  Non-competitive bids are usually opened until 12:00 (ET) while competitive ones – until 13:00.
- Single-price system
  All securities have the same interest rate which is determined by the highest accepted competitive bid. And the way the interest rate is conducted is by the single-price system. After the Treasury closes the bids, the quantity of non-competitive bids is subtracted from the whole amount of securities offered and then, it starts accepting the competitive bids until the amount of securities offered is exhausted.

== Example ==
The Treasury declares it will auction off $24 billion in securities of 2-year notes. First, non-competitive bids are taken into account – which in this case are $2 billion. Since all of the non-competitive bidders get the amount they are asking for, the amount of securities remaining for the competitive bids is therefore $22 billion.

The competitive participants declare the lowest interest rate they are willing to accept and the amount of Treasuries they want:

Bidder	Bid		Result	
Bidder	Amount	Rate	Settlement	Award
Non-competitive bids	$2 billion	any rate^{[a]}	Fully awarded	$2 billion at 2.85%
Company 1	$7 billion	2.70%	Fully awarded	$7 billion at 2.85%
Company 2	$5 billion	2.75%	Fully awarded	$5 billion at 2.85%
Company 3	$6 billion	2.80%	Fully awarded	$6 billion at 2.85%
Company 4	$8 billion	2.85%	Partially awarded	$4 billion at 2.85%
Company 5	$6 billion	2.90%	Not awarded	—
Total				$24 billion at 2.85%

^{a} By definition, non-competitive bids are willing to accept the rate determined by the competitive auction.

Outcome: Bids are evaluated in order beginning with the lowest desired interest rate. Since there are $22 billion of securities remaining to be awarded, the bid of Company 1 for $7 billion is able to be accepted in full, as are the bids of Companies 2 and 3. Upon evaluating the bid of Company 4, there are only $4 billion of securities left, so only $4 billion is awarded to Company 4 instead of the $8 billion asked. There are no securities remaining to award to Company 5.

Since the last company to be awarded any securities was Company 4, the interest rate they declared, 2.85%, becomes the standard rate for all Treasuries awarded in this auction. Thus, Companies 1, 2, and 3 also obtain 2.85% as their interest rate, as well as the non-competitive bidders. Company 5 receives no Treasuries, having indicated in its bid that it was not willing to accept such a rate.

== See also ==
- Outline of finance
