= 1988 United States Senate election in Hawaii =

- November 8, 1988
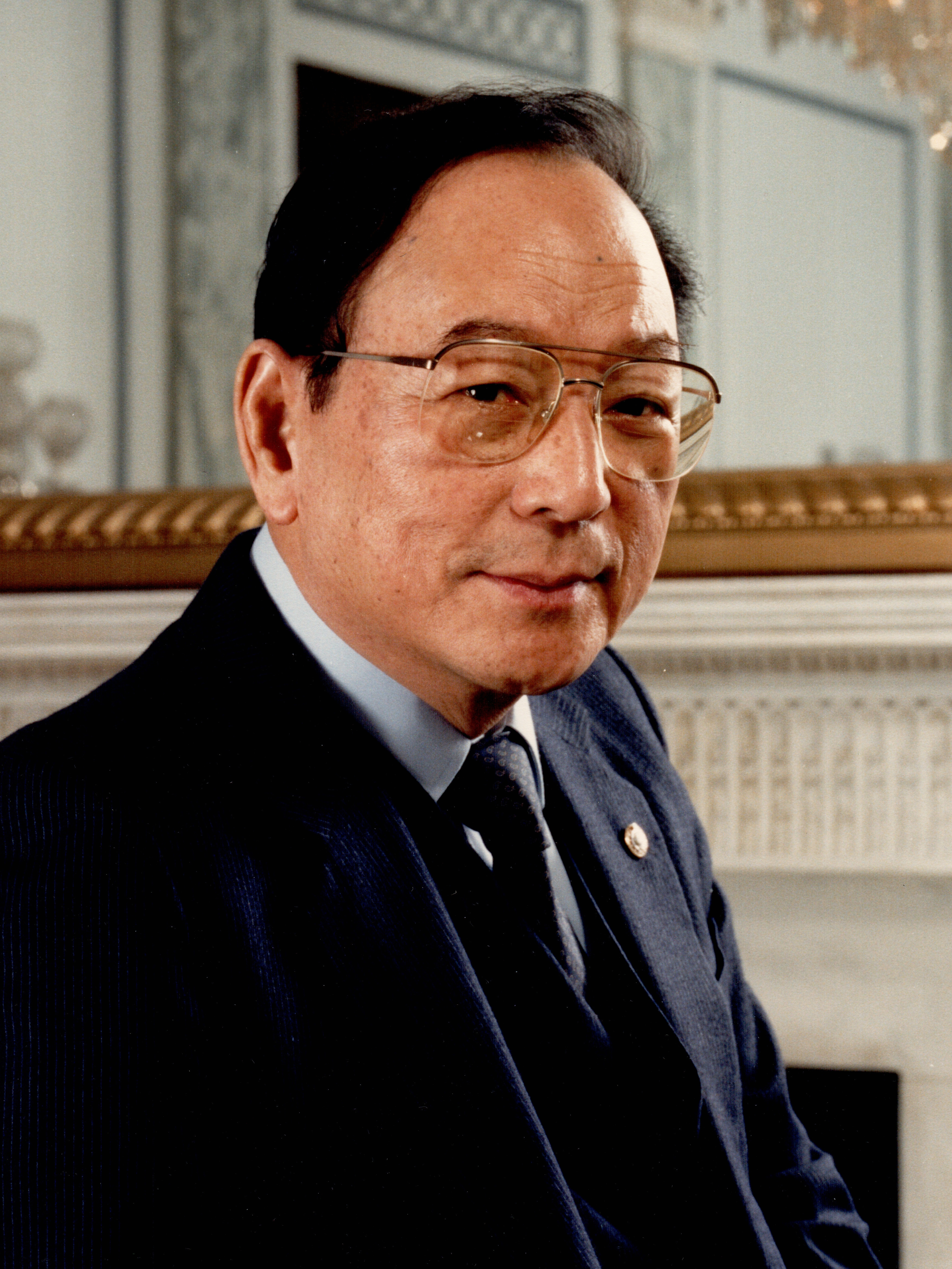

Nominee	Spark Matsunaga	Maria Hustace
Party	Democratic	Republican
Popular vote	247,941	66,987
Percentage	76.55%	20.68%
- County results Matsunaga: 70–80% 80–90%
U.S. senator before election
Spark Matsunaga
Democratic
Elected U.S. Senator
Spark Matsunaga
Democratic

The 1988 United States Senate election in Hawaii took place on November 8, 1988. Incumbent Democratic U.S. Senator Spark Matsunaga won re-election to a third and final term.

On April 15, 1990, Senator Matsunaga died of bone cancer, leading Governor John Waihe'e to appoint U.S. Representative from Hawaii's 2nd district Daniel Akaka to fill the seat. Akaka ran in the 1990 special election to fill out the remainder of the term, but won for his full term.

== Major candidates ==
=== Democratic ===
- Spark Matsunaga, incumbent U.S. Senator

=== Republican ===
- Maria Hustace, cattle rancher

== Results ==
General election results
Party	Candidate	Votes	%	±%
Democratic	Spark Matsunaga (Incumbent)	247,941	76.55%	−3.53%
Republican	Maria Hustace	66,987	20.68%	+3.69%
Libertarian	Ken Schoolland	8,948	2.76%	N/A
Total votes		323,876	100.00%	N/A
Democratic hold		Swing		

=== By county ===
County	Spark Matsunaga Democratic		Maria Hustace Republican		Ken Schoolland Libertarian		Margin		Total votes cast
County	#	%	#	%	#	%	#	%	Total votes cast
Hawaii	30,270	75.1%	8,868	22.0%	1,175	2.9%	21,402	53.1%	40,313
Honolulu	179,819	76.5%	48,781	20.8%	6,417	2.7%	131,038	55.7%	235,017
Kauaʻi	16,391	84.8%	2,427	12.6%	512	2.6%	13,964	76.2%	19,330
Maui	21,461	73.5%	6,911	23.7%	844	2.9%	14,550	49.8%	29,216
Totals	247,941	76.6%	66,987	20.7%	8,948	2.8%	180,954	55.9%	323,876

== See also ==
- 1988 United States Senate elections
