= United States Treasury security =

Government debt instruments

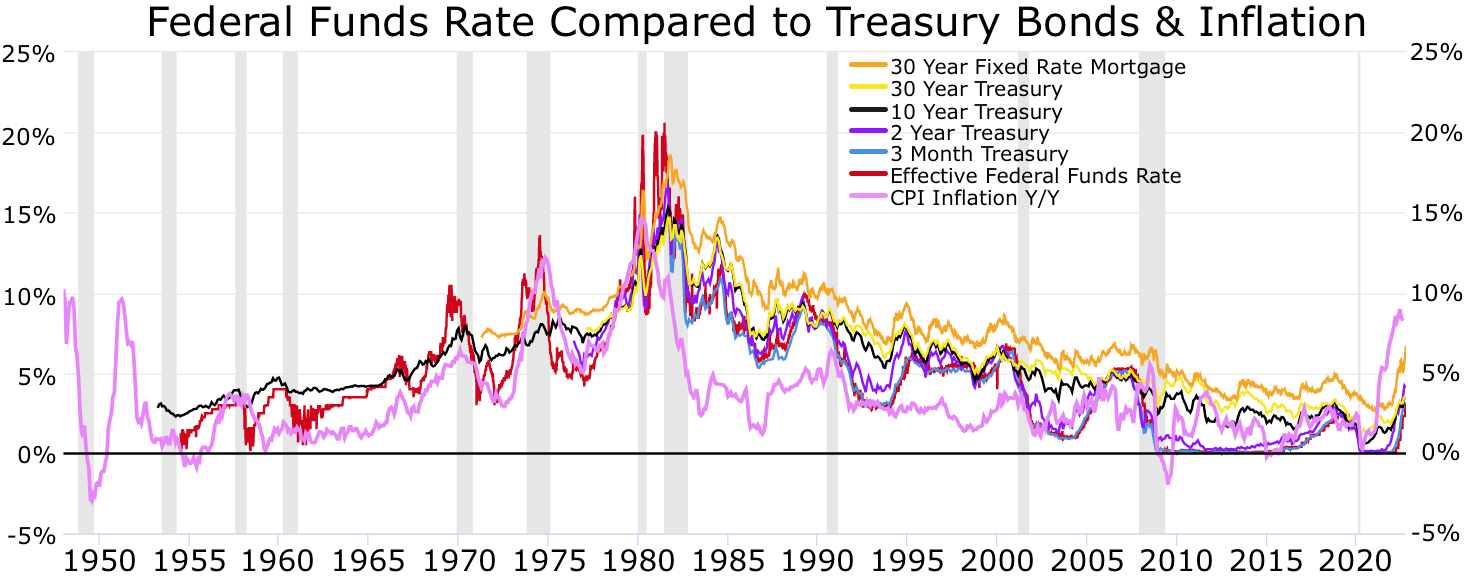
30 year mortgage average 30 Year Treasury Bond 10 Year Treasury Note 2 Year Treasury Note 3 month Treasury Bill Effective Federal Funds Rate CPI inflation year/year Recessions

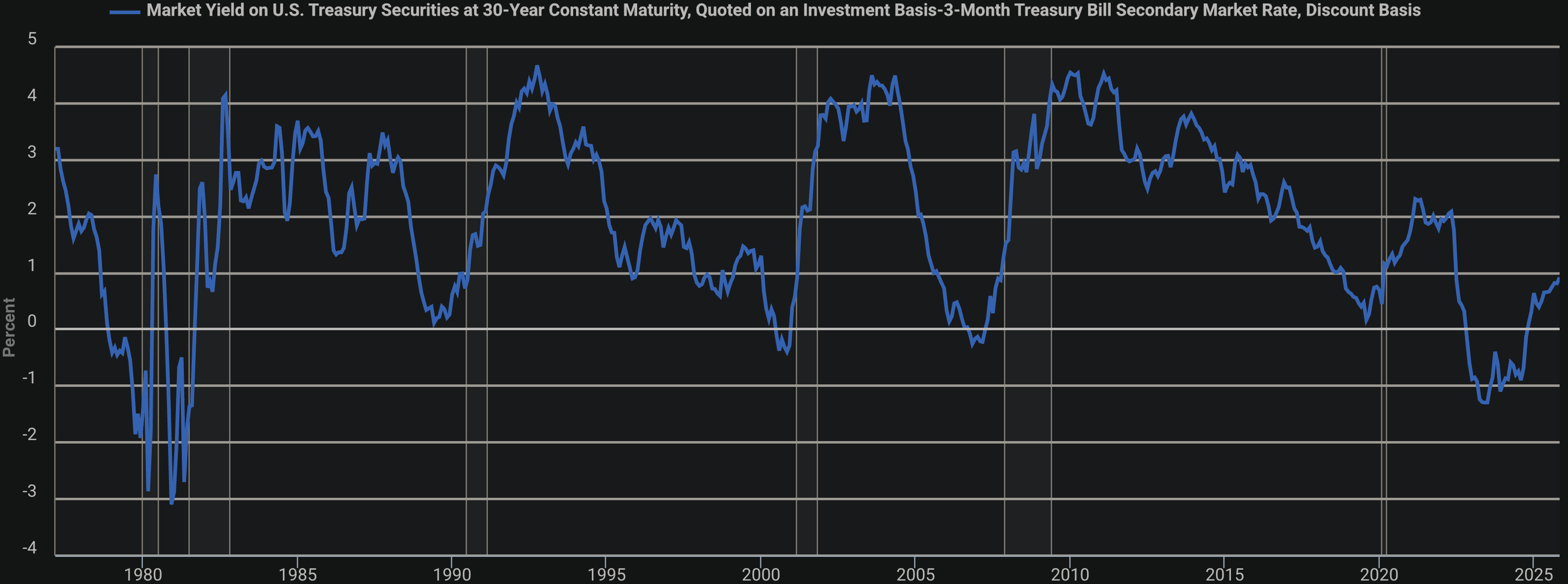
30 year treasury minus 3 month treasury bond

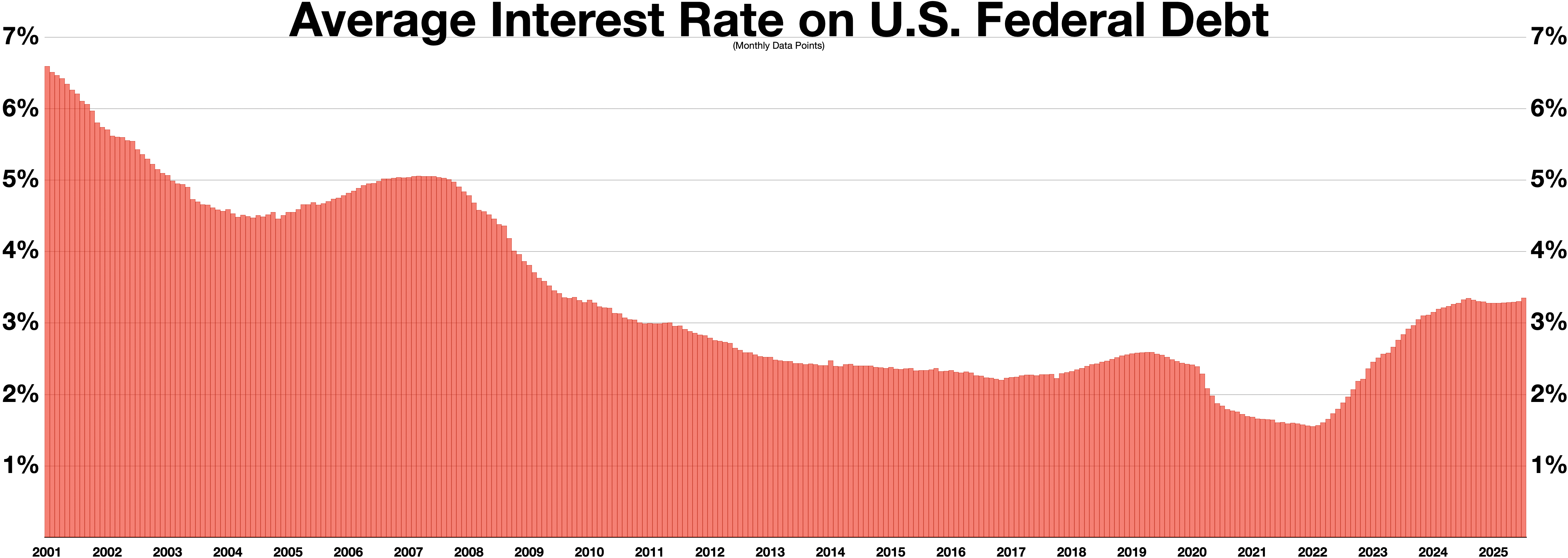
Average interest rate on new issues of U.S. Federal debt

United States Treasury securities, also called Treasuries or Treasurys, are government debt instruments issued by the United States Department of the Treasury to finance government spending as a supplement to taxation. Since 2012, the U.S. government debt has been managed by the Bureau of the Fiscal Service, succeeding the Bureau of the Public Debt.

There are four types of marketable Treasury securities: Treasury bills, Treasury notes, Treasury bonds, and Treasury Inflation Protected Securities (TIPS). The government sells these securities in auctions conducted by the Federal Reserve Bank of New York, after which they can be traded in secondary markets. Non-marketable securities include savings bonds, issued to individuals; the State and Local Government Series (SLGS), purchaseable only with the proceeds of state and municipal bond sales; and the Government Account Series, purchased by units of the federal government.

Treasury securities are backed by the full faith and credit of the United States, meaning that the government promises to raise money by any legally available means to repay them. Although the United States is a sovereign power and may default without recourse, its strong record of repayment has given Treasury securities a reputation as one of the world's lowest-risk investments. This low risk gives Treasuries a unique place in the financial system, where they are used as cash equivalents by institutions, corporations, and wealthy investors.

== Auctions ==
To finance the costs of World War I, the U.S. government increased income taxes (see the War Revenue Act of 1917) and issued government debt, called war bonds. Traditionally, the government borrowed from other countries, but there were no other countries from which to borrow in 1917.

The Treasury raised funding throughout the war by selling $21.5 billion in Liberty bonds. These bonds were sold at subscription, where officials created coupon price and then sold it at par value. At this price, subscriptions could be filled in as little as one day, but usually remained open for several weeks, depending on demand for the bond.

After the war, the Liberty bonds were reaching maturity, but the Treasury was unable to pay each down fully with only limited budget surpluses. To solve this problem, the Treasury refinanced the debt with variable short and medium-term maturities. Again, the Treasury issued debt through fixed-price subscription, where both the coupon and the price of the debt were dictated by the Treasury.

The problems with debt issuance became apparent in the late 1920s. The system suffered from chronic over-subscription, where interest rates were so attractive that there were more purchasers of debt than required by the government. This indicated that the government was paying too much for debt. As government debt was undervalued, debt purchasers could buy from the government and immediately sell to another market participant at a higher price.

In 1929, the US Treasury took inspiration from the procedure employed in the United Kingdom and shifted from the fixed-price subscription system to a system of auctioning where Treasury bills would be sold to the highest bidder until their demand was filled. If more treasuries were supplied by the government, they would then be allocated to the next highest bidder. This system allowed the market, rather than the government, to set the price. On December 13, 1929, the Treasury completed its first auction. The result was the issuing of $100 million zero-interest three-month bills. Total bids aggregated $224 million, the highest bid was at 99.310, with the lowest bid accepted at 99.152.

Until the 1970s, the Treasury offered long-term securities at irregular intervals based on market surveys. These irregular offerings created uncertainty in the money market, especially as the federal deficit increased, and by the end of the decade, the Treasury had shifted to regular and predictable offerings. During the same period, the Treasury began to offer notes and bonds through an auction process based on that used for bills.

== Marketable securities ==
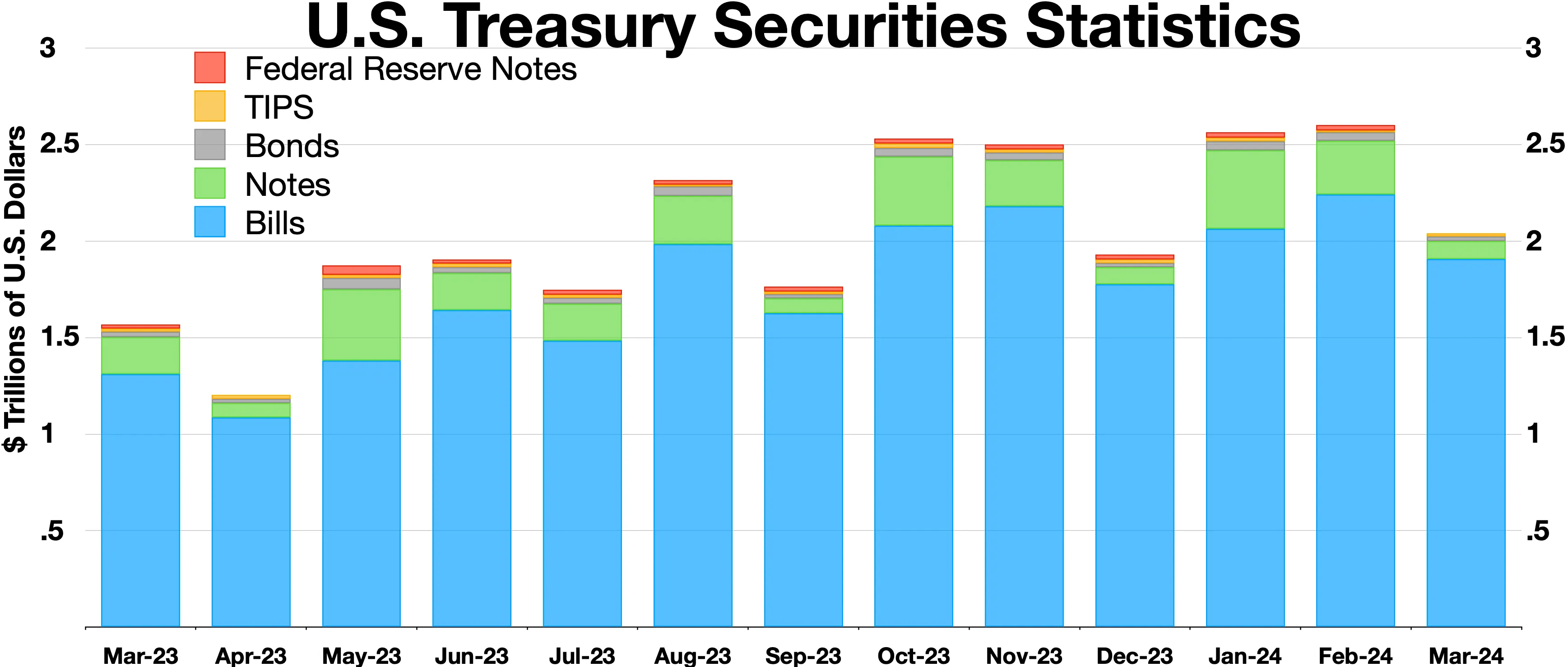
U.S. Treasury Securities Statistics (Monthly issuence) Federal Reserve Notes TIPS Bonds Notes Bills

The types and procedures for marketable security issues are described in the Treasury's Uniform Offering Circular (31 CFR 356).

=== Treasury bill ===
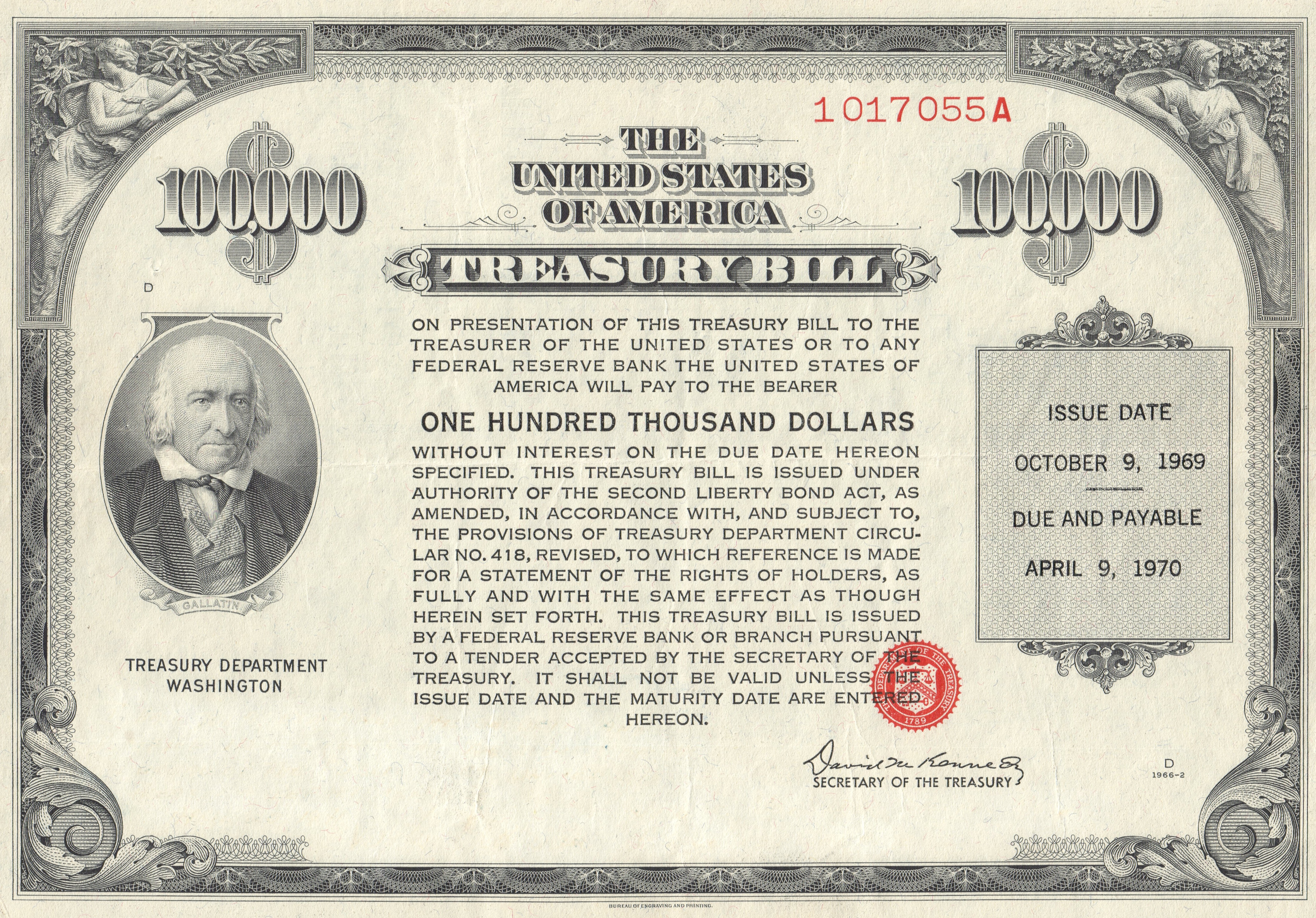
1969 $100,000 Treasury Bill

Treasury bills (T-bills) are zero-coupon bonds that mature in one year or less. They are bought at a discount of the par value and, instead of paying a coupon interest, are eventually redeemed at that par value to create a positive yield to maturity.

Regular T-bills are commonly issued with maturity dates of 4, 6, 8, 13, 17, 26 and 52 weeks. These lengths approximate different numbers of months, or 1.5 months for the 6-week bill. The bills are sold by single-price auctions that are held every four weeks for the 52-week bill and every week for the rest. The minimum purchase is $100; it had been $1,000 prior to April 2008. Banks and financial institutions, especially primary dealers, are the largest purchasers of T-bills.

Like other securities, individual issues of T-bills are identified with a unique CUSIP number. The 13-week bill issued three months after a 26-week bill is considered a re-opening of the 26-week bill and is given the same CUSIP number. The 4-week bill issued two months after that and maturing on the same day is also considered a re-opening of the 26-week bill and shares the same CUSIP number. For example, the 26-week bill issued on March 22, 2007, and maturing on September 20, 2007, has the same CUSIP number (912795A27) as the 13-week bill issued on June 21, 2007, and maturing on September 20, 2007, and as the 4-week bill issued on August 23, 2007, that matures on September 20, 2007.

During periods when Treasury cash balances are particularly low, the Treasury may sell cash management bills (CMBs). These are sold through a discount auction process like regular bills, but are irregular in the amount offered, the timing, and the maturity term. CMBs are referred to as "on-cycle" when they mature on the same day as a regular bill issue, and "off-cycle" otherwise. Before the introduction of the four-week bill in 2001, the Treasury sold CMBs routinely to ensure short-term cash availability. Since then CMB auctions have been infrequent except when the Treasury has extraordinary cash needs.

Treasury bills are quoted for purchase and sale in the secondary market on an annualized discount percentage, or basis. General calculation for the discount yield for Treasury bills is:

$$\text{discount yield}\,(\%) = \frac{\text{face value} - \text{purchase value}}{\text{face value}} \times \frac{360}{\text{days till maturity}} \times 100 \,\%$$

=== Treasury note ===
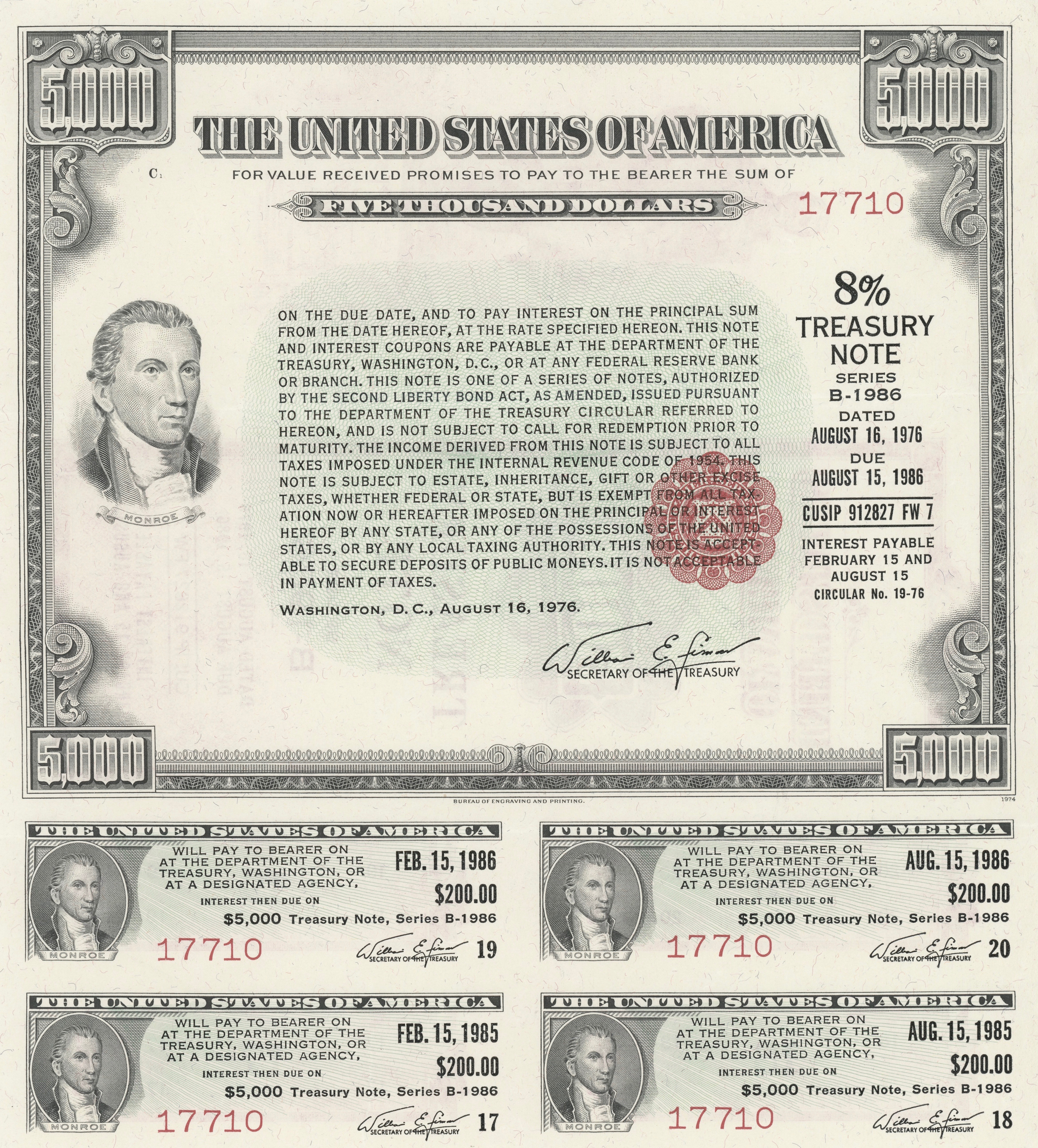
1976 $5,000 Treasury note

Treasury notes (T-notes) have maturities of 2, 3, 5, 7, or 10 years, have a coupon payment every six months, and are sold in increments of $100. T-note prices are quoted on the secondary market as a percentage of the par value in thirty-seconds of a dollar. Ordinary Treasury notes pay a fixed interest rate that is set at auction. Current yields on the 10-year Treasury note are widely followed by investors and the public to monitor the performance of the U.S. government bond market and as a proxy for investor expectations of longer-term macroeconomic conditions.

=== Treasury bond ===
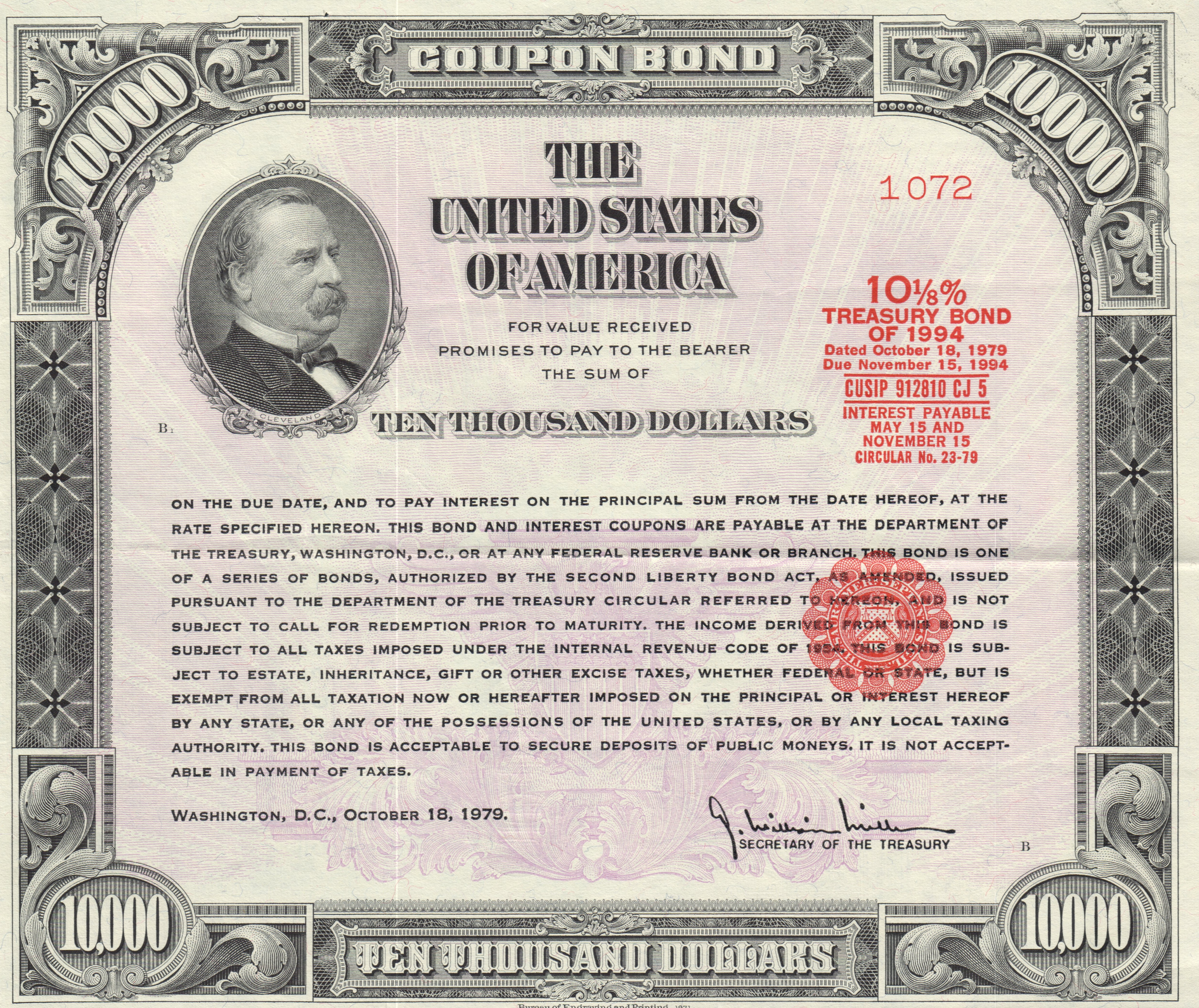
1979 $10,000 Treasury Bond

Treasury bonds (T-bonds, also called a long bond) have the longest maturity at twenty or thirty years. They have a coupon payment every six months like T-notes.

The U.S. federal government suspended issuing 30-year Treasury bonds for four years from February 18, 2002, to February 9, 2006. As the U.S. government used budget surpluses to pay down federal debt in the late 1990s, the 10-year Treasury note began to replace the 30-year Treasury bond as the general, most-followed metric of the U.S. bond market. However, because of demand from pension funds and large, long-term institutional investors, along with a need to diversify the Treasury's liabilities—and also because the flatter yield curve meant that the opportunity cost of selling long-dated debt had dropped—the 30-year Treasury bond was re-introduced in February 2006 and is now issued quarterly. In 2019, Treasury Secretary Steven Mnuchin said that the Trump administration was considering issuance of 50-year and even 100-year Treasury bonds, a suggestion which did not materialize.

In September 2026, the $32tn US Treasury market endured its sharpest one-day sell-off since the onset of President Trump's trade war, putting it on course for its worst month since late 2024. Ten-year US Treasury yields climbed above 5.2 per cent — their highest level since 2007 — as the price of the debt fell sharply. Thirty-year yields, meanwhile, exceeded 5.5 per cent for the first time since 2004. Over the same period, the 30-year mortgage rate reached 7 per cent, its highest level in nearly two years, compounding affordability pressures on households. The net US debt pile also surpassed $40tn.

=== TIPS and FRNs ===
Both TIPS and floating rate notes (FRNs) adjust conditions of the bonds to limit the exposure of bondholders to the change in the financial climate during the bond's lifetime. They differ significantly in the parameters they adjust.

Treasury Inflation-Protected Securities (TIPS) are marketable Treasury securities issued with maturities of 5, 10, or 30 years. Their principal is adjusted using the Consumer Price Index for All Urban Consumers, so it rises with inflation and falls with deflation. TIPS pay a fixed interest rate every six months, but the dollar interest payment changes because the rate is applied to the adjusted principal. At maturity, the holder receives the inflation-adjusted principal or the original principal, whichever is greater. The adjustments to the principal increase interest income when the CPI rises, thus protecting the holder's purchasing power. This "virtually guarantees" a real return over and above the rate of inflation, according to finance scholar Dr. Annette Thau.

Finance scholars Martinelli, Priaulet and Priaulet state that inflation-indexed securities in general (including those used in the United Kingdom and France) provide efficient instruments to diversify portfolios and manage risk because they have a weak correlation with stocks, fixed-coupon bonds and cash equivalents.

A 2014 study found that conventional U.S. Treasury bonds were persistently mispriced relative to TIPS, creating arbitrage opportunities and posing "a major puzzle to classical asset pricing theory".

Another type of Treasury note, known as the floating rate note, pays interest quarterly based on rates set in periodic auctions of 13-week Treasury bills. As with a conventional fixed-rate instrument, holders are paid the par value of the note when it matures at the end of the two-year term.

=== Coupon stripping ===
The secondary market for securities includes T-notes, T-bonds, and TIPS whose interest and principal portions of the security have been separated, or "stripped", in order to sell them separately. The practice derives from the days before computerization, when treasury securities were issued as paper bearer bonds; traders would literally separate the interest coupons from paper securities for separate resale, while the principal would be resold as a zero-coupon bond.

The modern versions are known as Separate Trading of Registered Interest and Principal Securities (STRIPS). The Treasury does not directly issue STRIPS – they are products of investment banks or brokerage firms – but it does register STRIPS in its book-entry system. STRIPS must be purchased through a broker, and cannot be purchased from TreasuryDirect.

== Nonmarketable securities ==
=== U.S. savings bonds ===
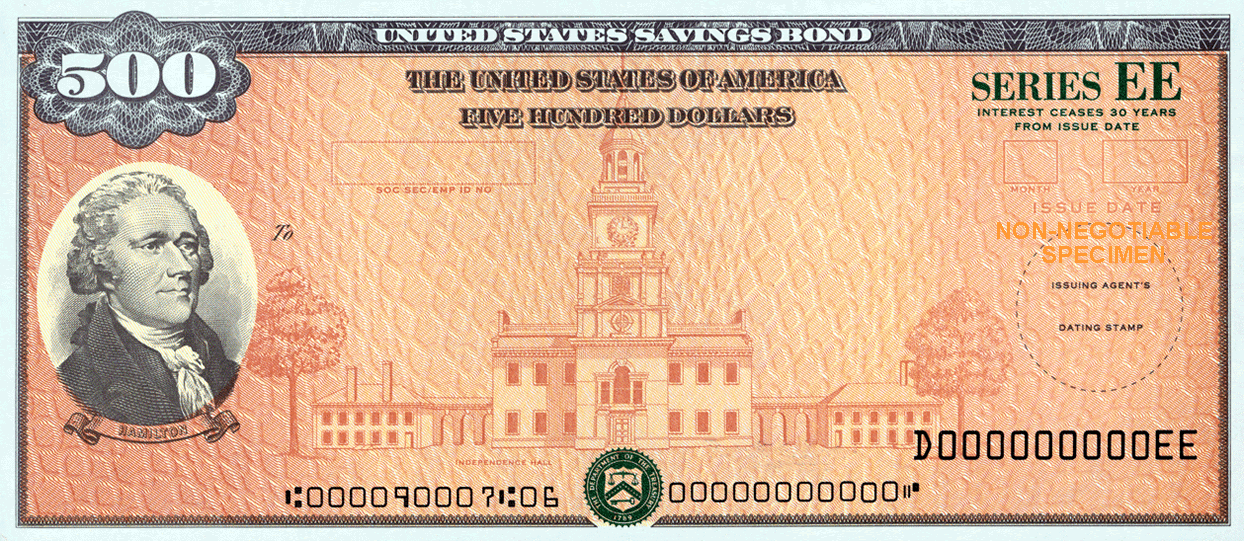
$500 Series EE US Savings Bond featuring Alexander Hamilton

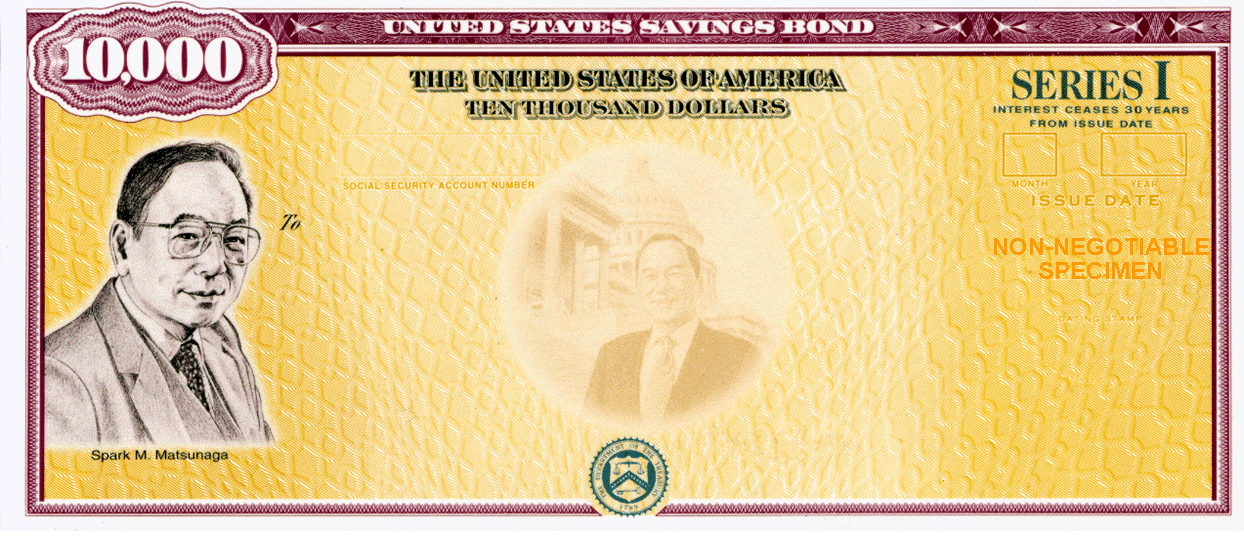
$10,000 Series I US Savings Bond featuring Spark Matsunaga

Savings bonds were created in 1935, and, in the form of Series E bonds, also known as war bonds, were widely sold to finance World War II. Unlike Treasury Bonds, they are not marketable, being redeemable only by the original purchaser (or beneficiary in case of death). They remained popular after the end of WWII, often used for personal savings and given as gifts. In 2002, the Treasury Department started changing the savings bond program by lowering interest rates and closing its marketing offices. As of January 1, 2012, financial institutions no longer sell paper savings bonds.

Savings bonds are currently offered in two forms, Series EE and Series I bonds. Series EE bonds pay a fixed rate but are guaranteed to pay at least double the purchase price when they reach initial maturity at 20 years; if the compounded interest has not resulted in a doubling of the initial purchase amount, the Treasury makes a one-time adjustment at 20 years to make up the difference. They continue to pay interest until 30 years.

Series I bonds have a variable interest rate that consists of two components. The first is a fixed rate which will remain constant over the life of the bond; the second component is a variable rate reset every six months from the time the bond is purchased based on the current inflation rate as measured by the Consumer Price Index for urban consumers (CPI-U) from a six-month period ending one month prior to the reset time. New rates are published on May 1 and November 1 of every year. During times of deflation the negative inflation rate can wipe out the return of the fixed portion, but the combined rate cannot go below 0% and the bond will not lose value. Series I bonds were the last ones offered as paper bonds after 2011, and those were only purchased by using a portion of a federal income tax refund. This option ended on January 1, 2025; since then, Series I bonds have been available only in electronic form.

=== Zero-Percent Certificate of Indebtedness ===
The "Certificate of Indebtedness" (C of I) is issued only through the TreasuryDirect system. It is an automatically renewed security with one-day maturity that can be purchased in any amount up to $1000, and does not earn interest. An investor can use Certificates of Indebtedness to save funds in a TreasuryDirect account for the purchase of an interest-bearing security.

=== Government Account Series ===
The Government Account Series is the principal form of intragovernmental debt holdings. Federal program agencies may invest money not required for current program needs in Government Account Series securities held in government investment accounts.

=== State and Local Government Series ===
The State and Local Government Series (SLGS) is issued to government entities below the federal level which have excess cash that was obtained through the sale of tax-exempt bonds. The federal tax code generally forbids investment of this cash in securities that offer a higher yield than the original bond, but SLGS securities are exempt from this restriction. The Treasury issues SLGS securities at its discretion and has suspended sales on several occasions to adhere to the federal debt ceiling.

== Holdings ==
=== Domestic ===
In June 2025 approximately $27 trillion of outstanding Treasury securities, representing 75% of the public debt, belonged to domestic holders. Of this amount $7.2 trillion or 20% of the debt was held by agencies of the federal government itself. These intragovernmental holdings function as time deposits of the agencies' excess and reserve funds to the Treasury. The Federal Reserve Bank of New York was also a significant holder as the market agent of the Federal Reserve system, with $4.5 trillion or roughly 12.5%. Other holders included mutual funds ($4.2 trillion), state and local governments ($2.2 trillion), banks ($2 trillion), insurers ($590 billion), private pension funds ($540 billion) and assorted private entities and individuals ($6.1 trillion, including $153 billion in Savings Bonds).

=== International ===
As of June 30, 2025, the top foreign holders of U.S. Treasury securities are:

Debt holder	Total (in US$ billion)	% change since June '24	% held as long-term debt
Japan	1,147.5	+ 5%	89%
United Kingdom	852.9	+15%	90%
China	731.5	(− 6%)	90%
Cayman Islands	440.4	+35%	65%
Canada	438.5	+18%	92%
Belgium	429.5	+36%	81%
Luxembourg	401.7	+ 9%	77%
France	371.5	+24%	95%
Ireland	316.0	(− 5%)	70%
Taiwan	307.3	+15%	99%
Switzerland	299.1	+ 5%	80%
Singapore	253.0	+19%	95%
Hong Kong	241.9	+ 7%	79%
India	227.0	(− 6%)	93%
Brazil	215.5	(− 5%)	98%
Norway	195.2	+26%	>99%
others	2,207.6	+12%	77%
Total	9,076.1	+11%	84%

== See also ==
- Chiasso financial smuggling case
- Consol
- Government debt
- Interest
- Inverted yield curve
- Risk
- Strong dollar policy
- War bond
- War savings stamps
