= Daniel Akaka =

American politician (1924–2018)

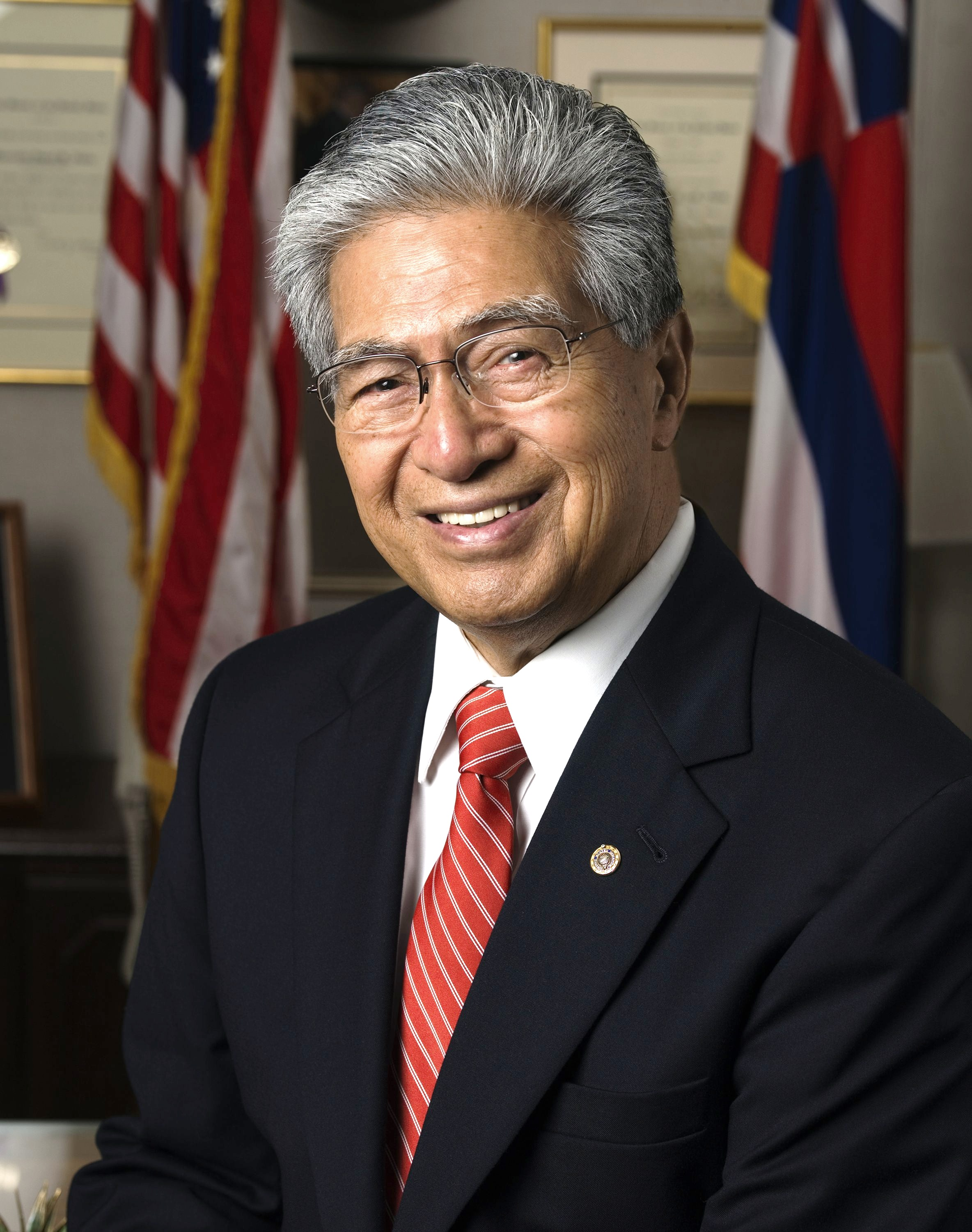
- Official portrait, 2006

United States Senator from Hawaii
- In office May 16, 1990 – January 3, 2013
- Preceded by: Spark Matsunaga
- Succeeded by: Mazie Hirono

Member of the U.S. House of Representatives from Hawaii's 2nd district
- In office January 3, 1977 – May 16, 1990
- Preceded by: Patsy Mink
- Succeeded by: Patsy Mink

Personal details
- Born: Daniel Kahikina Akaka; September 11, 1924 Honolulu, Territory of Hawaii
- Died: April 6, 2018 (aged 93) Honolulu, Hawaii, U.S.
- Resting place: National Memorial Cemetery of the Pacific
- Party: Democratic
- Spouse: Mary Chong
- Children: 5, including Alan
- Relatives: Abraham Akaka (brother); Kalei Akaka (granddaughter)
- Education: University of Hawaiʻi at Mānoa (BEd, MEd)

Military service
- Branch/service: United States Army
- Years of service: 1945–1947
- Rank: Corporal
- Unit: United States Army Corps of Engineers
- Battles/wars: World War II
- Daniel Akaka's voice Daniel Akaka introduces the Hawaii Tropical Forest Recovery Act; Recorded May 7, 1992

Daniel Akaka
- Chinese: 李硕
Transcriptions
Standard Mandarin
- Hanyu Pinyin: Lǐ Shuò

Daniel Kahikina Akaka (/əˈkɑːkə/; September 11, 1924 – April 6, 2018) was an American educator and politician who served as a United States Senator from Hawaii from 1990 to 2013. He was a member of the Democratic Party.

Born in Honolulu, he served in the U.S. Army Corps of Engineers during World War II. He attended the University of Hawaiʻi, where he received his bachelor's and master's degrees. Originally a high school teacher, Akaka went on to serve as a principal for six years. In 1969, the Department of Education hired him as a chief program planner. In the 1970s, he served in various governmental positions.

Akaka was first elected to the United States House of Representatives in 1976 to represent Hawaii's 2nd congressional district; he served for 13 years. In 1990, he was appointed to the U.S. Senate to succeed the deceased Spark Matsunaga, subsequently winning the special election to complete Matsunaga's term. He would later be reelected to three full terms. During his Senate tenure, Akaka served as the Chair of the United States Senate Committee on Indian Affairs and the United States Senate Committee on Veterans' Affairs. Akaka sponsored legislation that led to nearly two dozen Medals of Honor being belatedly awarded to Asian-American soldiers in the 442nd Regimental Combat Team and the 100th Infantry Battalion. In addition, he passed legislation compensating Philippine Scouts who were refused veterans benefits. Akaka also sponsored a bill that would have afforded sovereignty to Native Hawaiians. He did not seek reelection in 2012.

== Early life, family, education, and military service ==
Daniel Kahikina Akaka was born in Honolulu, the son of Annie (née Kahoa) and Kahikina Akaka. His paternal grandfather was born in Shantou, Guangdong, China, and his other grandparents were of Native Hawaiian descent. His brother was Rev. Abraham Akaka.

Akaka described Hawaiian as his "native tongue".

Akaka graduated from Kamehameha Schools in 1942. During World War II he served in the United States Army Corps of Engineers, including service on Saipan and Tinian. He served from 1945 to 1947. He worked as a welder and a mechanic and in 1948 was a first mate on the schooner Morning Star.

Entering college (funded by the G.I. Bill), Akaka earned a Bachelor of Education in 1952 from the University of Hawaiʻi. He later received a Master of Education from the same school in 1966.

== Early career ==
Akaka worked as a high school teacher in Honolulu from 1953 until 1960, when he was hired as a vice principal. In 1963, he became head principal.

In 1969, the Department of Health, Education and Welfare hired Akaka as a chief program planner. Akaka continued working in government, holding positions as director of the Hawaii Office of Economic Opportunity, human resources assistant for Governor George Ariyoshi, and director of the Progressive Neighborhoods Program.

== U.S. House of Representatives (1977–1990) ==
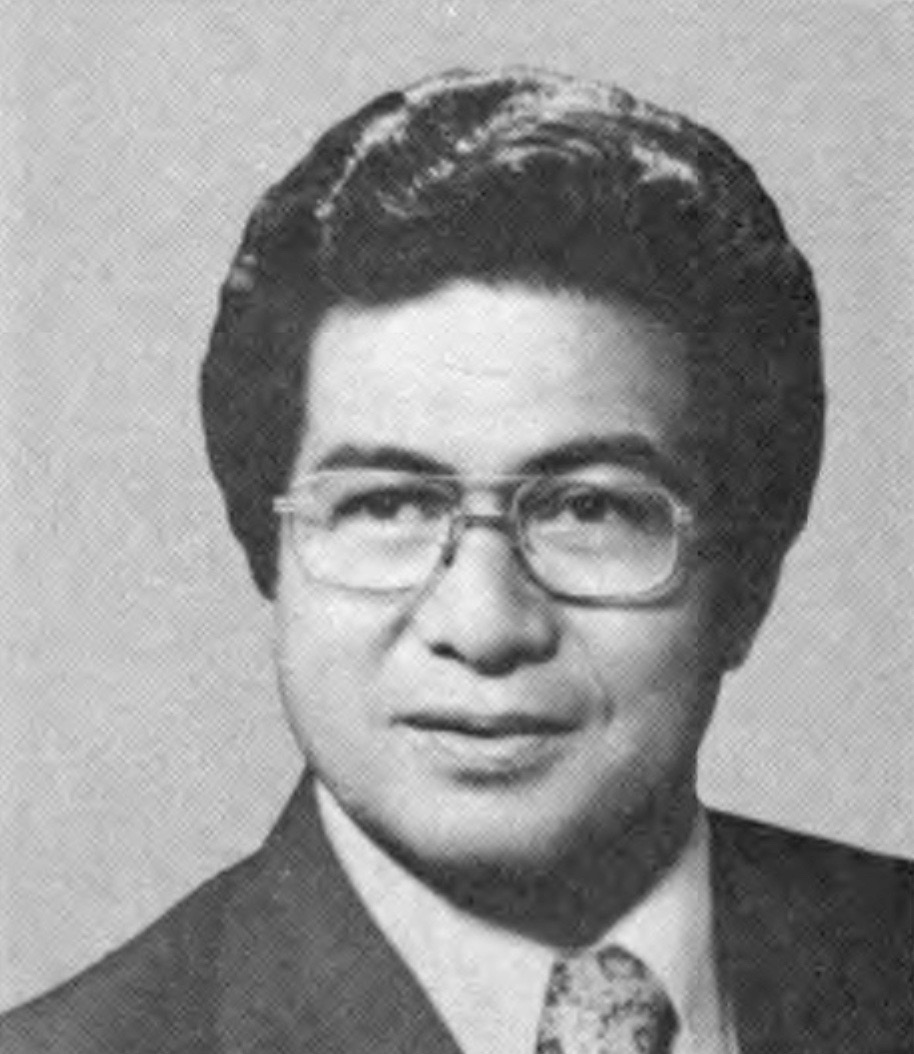
Akaka in 1977, during his first term in Congress

Akaka was first elected to the United States House of Representatives in 1976 to represent Hawaii's 2nd congressional district, comprising all of the state outside the city of Honolulu. He was reelected seven times, all by wide margins; apart from 1986, when he obtained 76%, he never received less than 80 percent of the vote.

Akaka voted for the Economic Recovery Tax Act of 1981. The Act aimed to stimulate economic growth by significantly reducing income tax rates. It passed the House of Representatives in a 323–107 vote, the Senate via a voice vote, and it was signed into law by President Ronald Reagan on August 13, 1981. However, Akaka voted against the Omnibus Budget Reconciliation Act of 1981. The Act decreased federal spending and increased military funding. Despite his vote against it, the bill passed the House of Representatives in a 232–193 vote, the Senate via a voice vote, and it was signed into law by President Ronald Reagan the same day.

Akaka voted for the Abandoned Shipwrecks Act of 1987. The Act asserts United States title to certain abandoned shipwrecks located on or embedded in submerged lands under state jurisdiction, and transfers title to the respective state, thereby empowering states to manage these cultural and historical resources more efficiently, with the goal of preventing treasure hunters and salvagers from damaging them. President Ronald Reagan signed it into law on April 28, 1988.

== U.S. Senate (1990–2013) ==
=== Elections ===
Akaka was appointed by Governor John Waihee to the U.S. Senate in April 1990 to serve temporarily after the death of Senator Spark Matsunaga. In November of the same year, he was elected to complete the remaining four years of Matsunaga's unexpired term, defeating U.S. Representative Pat Saiki with 53% of the vote. He was reelected in 1994 for a full six-year term with over 70% of the vote. He was reelected almost as easily in 2000.

For the 2006 election, he overcame a strong primary challenge from U.S. Representative Ed Case, then won a third full term with 61 percent of the vote, defeating Cynthia Thielen.

=== Tenure ===
During his Senate tenure, Akaka served as the Chair of the Senate Committee on Indian Affairs and the Senate Committee on Veterans' Affairs.

In 1996, Akaka sponsored legislation that led to nearly two dozen Medals of Honor being belatedly awarded to Asian-American soldiers in the 442nd Regimental Combat Team and the 100th Infantry Battalion. He also passed legislation compensating Philippine Scouts who were refused veterans benefits.

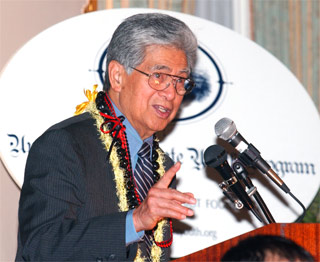
Akaka at a Senate youth program in 2005

From 2000 until his retirement from the Senate in 2013, Akaka sponsored legislation, known as the Akaka Bill, to afford sovereignty to Native Hawaiians. In 2005, Akaka acknowledged in an interview with NPR that the Akaka Bill could eventually result in outright independence.

The Akaka Bill has been supported as a means of restoring Hawaiian self-determination lost with the 1893 overthrow of the Kingdom of Hawaii. It would include giving up the ability to sue for sovereignty in federal courts in exchange for recognition by the federal government (but would not block sovereignty claims made under international law.) The bill has been criticized as discriminating on the basis on ethnic origin in that only Native Hawaiians would be permitted to participate in the governing entity that the bill would establish.

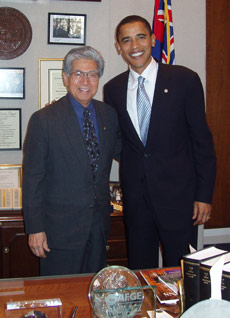
Akaka with then-U.S. Senator Barack Obama in 2005

In October 2002, Akaka voted against authorizing the use of military force against Iraq.

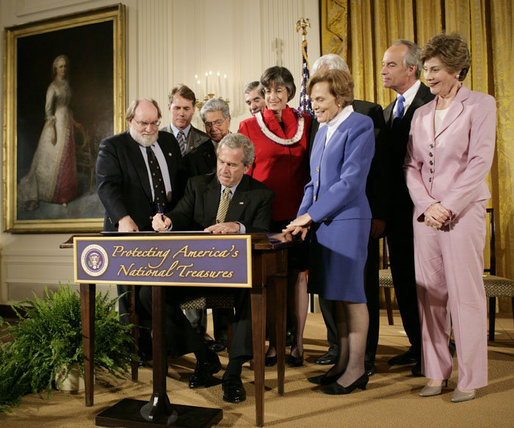
Akaka and President George W. Bush in 2006

In April 2006, Akaka was ranked by Time as one of America's Five Worst Senators. The article criticized him for mainly authoring minor legislation, calling him "master of the minor resolution and the bill that dies in committee".

In February 2009, a bill was authored in the Philippine House of Representatives by Rep. Antonio Diaz seeking to confer honorary Filipino citizenship on Akaka, Senators Daniel Inouye and Ted Stevens and Representative Bob Filner, for their role in securing the passage of benefits for Filipino World War II veterans.

On March 2, 2011, Akaka announced he would not seek re-election in 2012.

After fellow U.S. Senator Daniel Inouye of Hawaii died on December 17, 2012, Akaka "took to the Senate floor to speak of Inouye's legacy. He called him 'the man who changed the islands forever.' 'It is very difficult for me to rise today with a heavy heart and bid aloha to my good friend, colleague and brother Dan Inouye', he said. 'It is hard for me to believe the terrible news I received is true. Sen. Inouye was a true patriot and an American hero in every sense'".

Following Inouye's death, Akaka became the state's senior senator for two weeks until he left office on January 3, 2013. He was succeeded by fellow Democrat Mazie Hirono.

=== Committee assignments ===
- Committee on Armed Services
  - Subcommittee on Personnel
  - Subcommittee on Readiness and Management Support
  - Subcommittee on SeaPower
- Committee on Banking, Housing, and Urban Affairs
  - Subcommittee on Housing, Transportation, and Community Development
  - Subcommittee on Financial Institutions
  - Subcommittee on Securities, Insurance, and Investment
- Committee on Homeland Security and Governmental Affairs
  - Subcommittee on Federal Financial Management, Government Information and International Security
  - Subcommittee on Oversight of Government Management, the Federal Workforce and the District of Columbia (Chairman)
  - Ad Hoc Subcommittee on State, Local, and Private Sector Preparedness and Integration
- Committee on Indian Affairs (Chairman)
- Committee on Veterans' Affairs
- Congressional Task Force on Native Hawaiian Issues (Chairman)

=== Caucus memberships ===
- Congressional Asian Pacific American Caucus
- Congressional Biotechnology Caucus
- Congressional Postal Caucus (Vice Chair)
- International Conservation Caucus
- Senate Anti-Meth Caucus
- Senate Army Caucus (Co-Chair)
- Senate Sweetener Caucus (Co-Chair)
- Senate Oceans Caucus

== Personal life and death ==
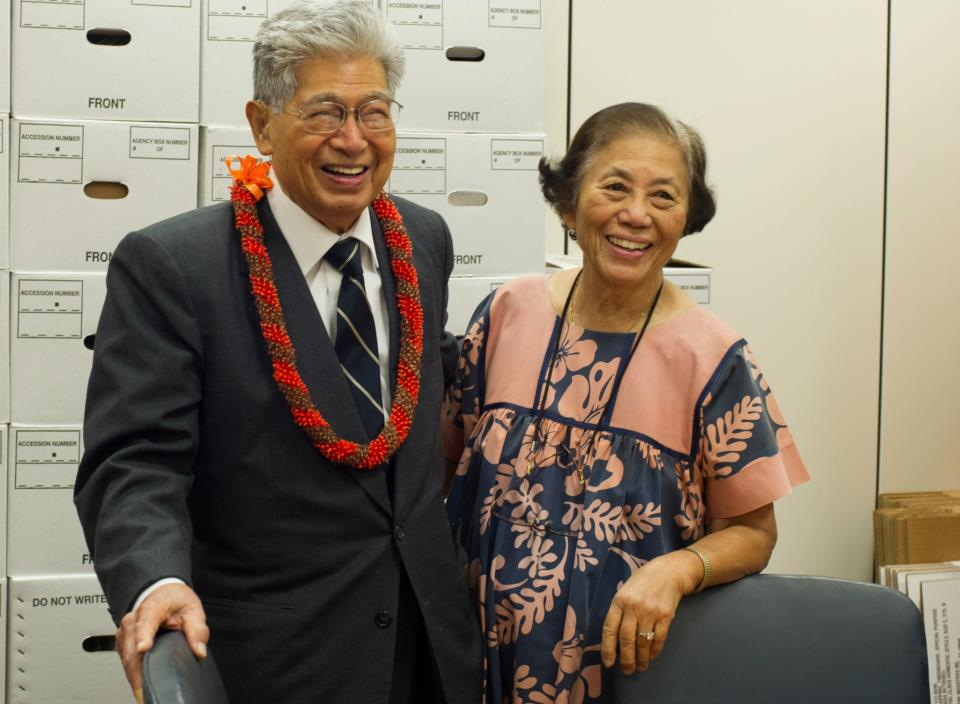
Senator Akaka and his wife, Millie Akaka, in 2012

Akaka married Mary Mildred "Millie" Chong on May 22, 1948. The Akakas had five children. His granddaughter, Kalei Akaka, has served as a statewide elected official on the Office of Hawaiian Affairs Board of Trustees (first elected in 2018).

Akaka died of organ failure at a Honolulu care facility on April 6, 2018, at the age of 93. Former president Barack Obama remembered Akaka as "a tireless advocate for working people, veterans, native Hawaiian rights, and the people of Hawaii. [...] He embodied the aloha spirit with compassion and care."

== Electoral history ==
United States Senate special election, 1990: Hawaii
Party	Candidate	Votes	%	±%
Democratic	Daniel Akaka	188,901	53.72	
Republican	Pat Saiki	155,978	44.35	
Libertarian	Ken Schoolland	6,788	1.93	
Majority		32,923	9.36	
Turnout		351,666		

United States Senate election, 1994: Hawaii
Party	Candidate	Votes	%	±%
Democratic	Daniel Akaka (incumbent)	256,189	71.8%	
Republican	Maria Hustace	86,320	24.2%	
Libertarian	Richard Rowland	14,393	4.0%	
Majority				
Turnout				
Democratic hold		Swing		

United States Senate election, 2000: Hawaii
Party	Candidate	Votes	%	±%
Democratic	Daniel Akaka (incumbent)	251,215	77.7%	
Republican	John Carroll	84,701	24.5%	
Natural Law	Lauri A. Clegg	4,220	1.2%	
Libertarian	Lloyd Jeffrey Mallan	3,127	0.9%	
Constitution	David Porter	2,360	0.7%	

United States Senate election, 2006: Hawaii
Party	Candidate	Votes	%	±%
Democratic	Daniel Akaka (incumbent)	210,330	61.4	−11.5
Republican	Cynthia Thielen	126,097	36.8	+12.3
Libertarian	Lloyd Mallan	6,415	1.9	+1.0
Majority		84,233	24.6	
Turnout		342,842		
Democratic hold		Swing		

== See also ==
- List of Asian Americans and Pacific Islands Americans in the United States Congress

U.S. House of Representatives
Preceded by Patsy Mink	Member of the U.S. House of Representatives from Hawaii's 2nd congressional district 1977–1990	Succeeded by Patsy Mink
Party political offices
Preceded by Spark Matsunaga	Democratic nominee for U.S. Senator from Hawaii (Class 1); 1990, 1994, 2000, 2006	Succeeded by Mazie Hirono
U.S. Senate
Preceded by Spark Matsunaga	U.S. Senator (Class 1) from Hawaii; 1990–2013; Served alongside: Dan Inouye, Brian Schatz	Succeeded by Mazie Hirono
Preceded by Bob Graham	Ranking Member of the Senate Veterans' Affairs Committee; 2005–2007	Succeeded by Larry Craig
Preceded by Larry Craig	Chair of the Senate Veterans' Affairs Committee; 2007–2011	Succeeded by Patty Murray
Preceded by Byron Dorgan	Chair of the Senate Indian Affairs Committee; 2011–2013	Succeeded by Maria Cantwell
