= 1976 United States Senate election in Hawaii =

- November 2, 1976
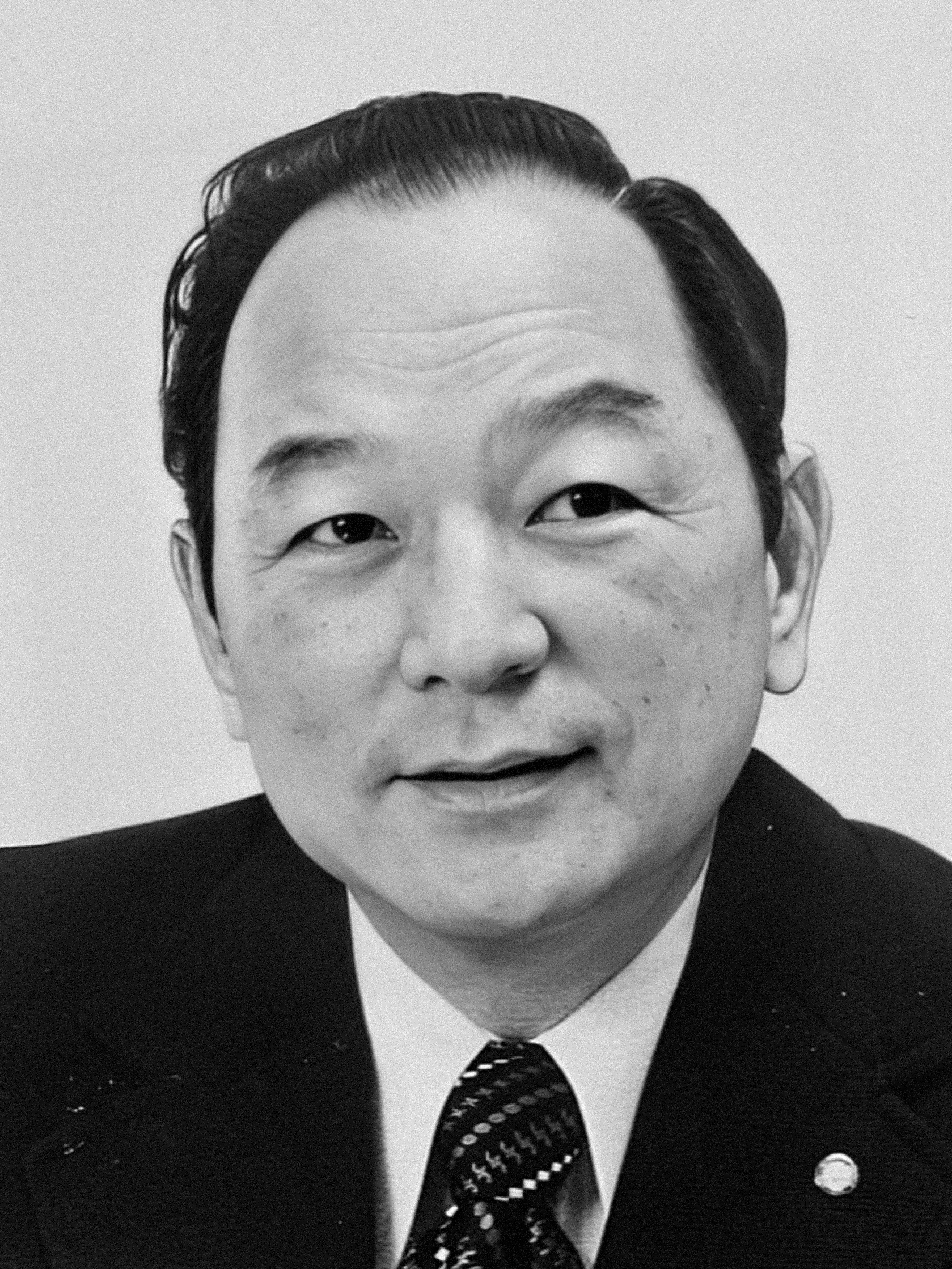

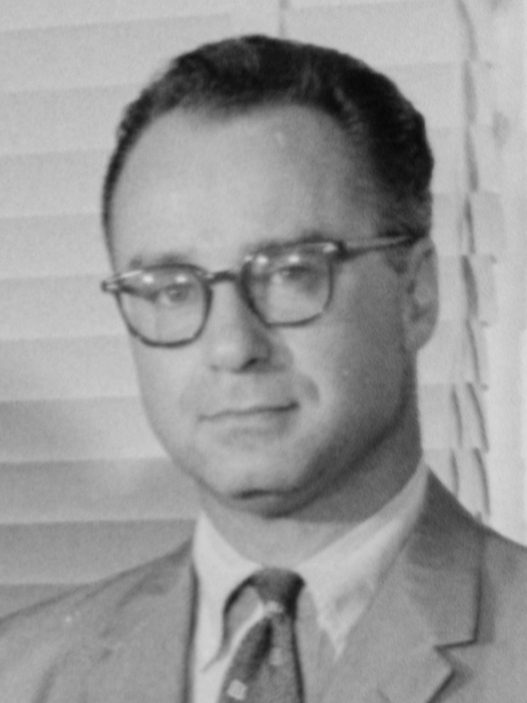
Nominee	Spark Matsunaga	William Quinn
Party	Democratic	Republican
Popular vote	162,305	122,724
Percentage	53.73%	40.62%
- County results Matsunaga: 50–60% 60–70%
U.S. senator before election
Hiram Fong
Republican
Elected U.S. Senator
Spark Matsunaga
Democratic

The 1976 United States Senate election in Hawaii took place on November 2, 1976. Incumbent Republican U.S. Senator Hiram Fong did not seek re-election to a fourth term. Democrat Spark Matsunaga won the open seat by defeating Republican William Quinn.

Primary elections were held on October 2. Former Governor William F. Quinn easily won the Republican nomination with 93 percent of the vote. In the Democratic primary, Spark Matsunaga won with 51 percent of the vote. His closest competitor was his House colleague Patsy Mink, who received 41 percent.

== Democratic primary ==
=== Candidates ===
- Spark Matsunaga, U.S. Representative
- Patsy Mink, U.S. Representative from Honolulu

== General election ==
=== Candidates ===
- Anthony Hodges (People's)
- Rockne Hart Johnson (Libertarian)
- James Kimmel (Independent)
- Spark Matsunaga, U.S. Congressman (Democratic)
- William Quinn, former Governor of Hawaii (Republican)

=== Results ===
1976 U.S. Senate election in Hawaii
Party	Candidate	Votes	%	±%
Democratic	Spark Matsunaga	162,305	53.73%	+5.30%
Republican	William F. Quinn	122,724	40.62%	−10.95%
People's	Anthony Hodges	14,226	4.71%	
Independent	James Kimmel	1,433	0.47%	
Libertarian	Rockne Hart Johnson	1,404	0.46%	
Democratic gain from Republican				

== See also ==
- 1976 United States Senate elections
