= 1988 Stockholm municipal election =

Swedish local election

The Stockholm municipal election of 1988 was held on 18 September 1988 concurrently with the 1988 Swedish parliamentary election. This election used a party-list proportional representation system to allocate the 101 seats of the Stockholm City Council (Stockholms stadsfullmäktige) amongst the various Swedish political parties. Voter turnout was 81.4%.

The Swedish Centre Party returned to the Stockholm City Council this year after dismal results in 1985 deprived them of a mandate.

This election is the fourth in which the Stockholm Party succeeded in winning seats on the Stockholm City Council. It marks the high-water mark of the Stockholm Party's electoral success.

== Results ==
Party	Votes			Seats	
Party	#	%	+ –	#	+ –
Social Democrats; Socialdemokraterna (s)	150,135	34.0%	–1.7%	36	–4
Moderate Party; Moderata samlingspartiet (m)	121,520	27.5%	–1.9%	28	–5
People's Party; Folkpartiet (fp)	55,862	12.6%	–0.9%	13	–1
Left Party Communists; Vänsterpartiet kommunisterna (v)	44,739	10.1%	+1.3%	11	+1
Centre Party; Centerpartiet (c)	17,584	4.0%	+1.1%	5	+5
Green Party; Miljöpartiet (mp)	10,414	2.4%	+0.5%	0	±0
Christian Democratic; Kristdemokratiska samhällspartiet (kd)	6,629	1.5%	+0.6%	0	±0
Other parties	35,270	8.0%	+0.9%	8	+4
Total	442,153	100%	—	101	±0
Invalid ballots	6,095				

== See also ==
- Elections in Sweden
- List of political parties in Sweden
- City of Stockholm
