= Spark Matsunaga =

American politician (1916–1990)

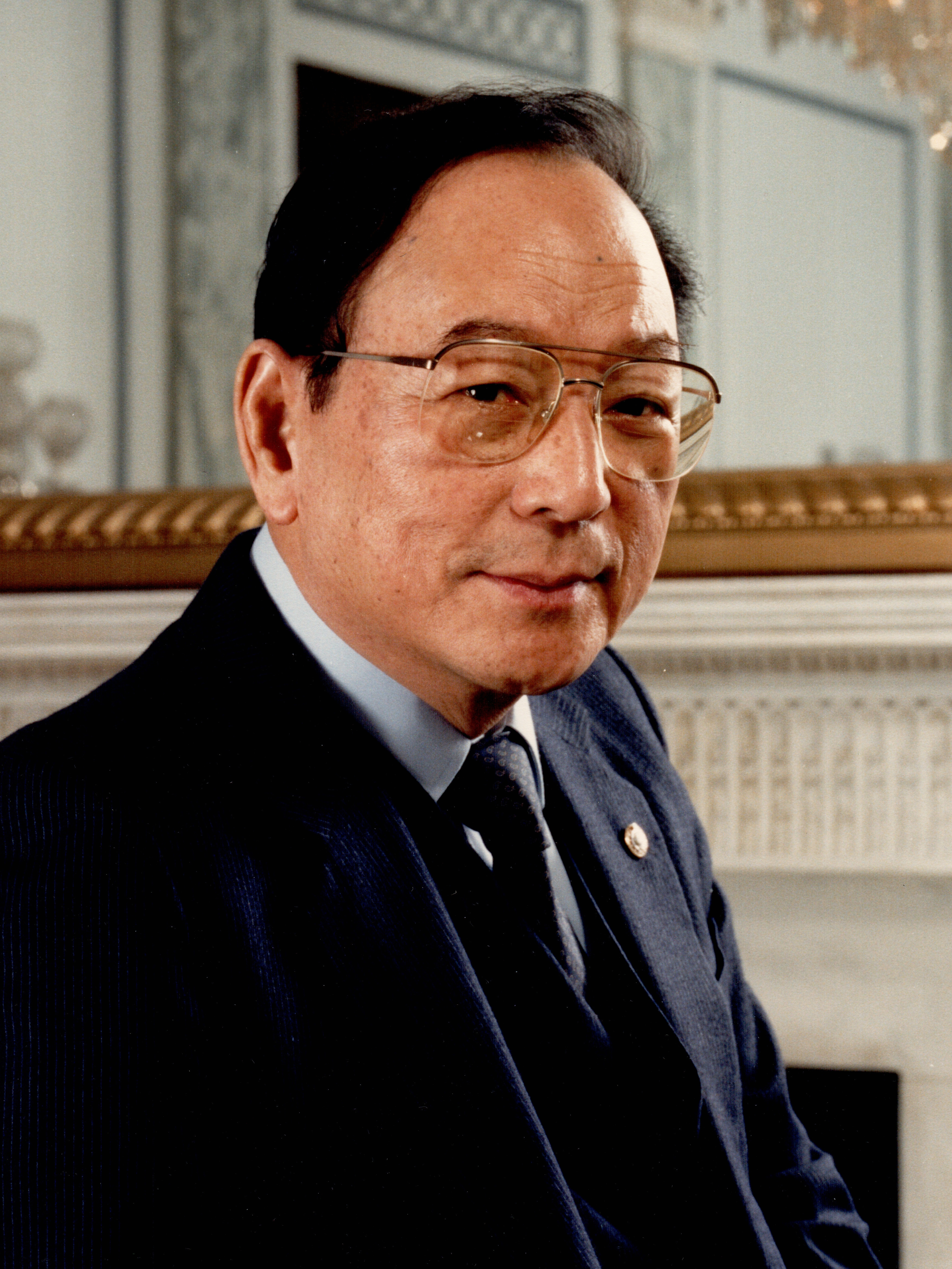
- Official portrait, 1986

United States Senator from Hawaii
- In office January 3, 1977 – April 15, 1990
- Preceded by: Hiram Fong
- Succeeded by: Daniel Akaka

Member of the U.S. House of Representatives from Hawaii
- In office January 3, 1963 – January 3, 1977
- Preceded by: Daniel Inouye
- Succeeded by: Cecil Heftel
- Constituency: At-large (1963–1971); 1st district (1971–1977)

Personal details
- Born: Masayuki Matsunaga; October 8, 1916 Kukuiula, Territory of Hawaii
- Died: April 15, 1990 (aged 73) Toronto, Ontario, Canada
- Resting place: National Memorial Cemetery of the Pacific
- Party: Democratic
- Spouse: Helene Matsunaga (m. 1951)
- Children: 5
- Education: University of Hawaiʻi at Mānoa (BA); Harvard University (LLB)

Military service
- Allegiance: United States
- Branch/service: United States Army
- Years of service: 1941–1945
- Rank: Captain
- Unit: 442nd Regimental Combat Team; 100th Infantry Battalion
- Battles/wars: World War II
- Spark Matsunaga's voice Matsunaga discusses the importance of the United States Institute of Peace; Recorded July 29, 1986

Spark Masayuki Matsunaga (October 8, 1916 – April 15, 1990) was an American politician and attorney who served as United States Senator for Hawaii from 1977 until his death in 1990. Matsunaga also represented Hawaii in the U.S. House of Representatives and served in the Hawaii territorial house of representatives. A member of the Democratic Party, Matsunaga introduced legislation that led to the creation of the United States Institute of Peace and to reparations to Japanese-American World War II detainees.

== Early life ==
Born Masayuki Matsunaga on October 8, 1916, the Territory of Hawaii island of Kauaʻi, Spark Matsunaga was Japanese-American. His parents had emigrated to the United States from Japan. When he was eight, he was nicknamed Sparky after Spark Plug, a character in the comic strip Barney Google and Snuffy Smith. He received a bachelor's degree with honors in education from the University of Hawaiʻi in 1941.

Following the Japanese attack on Pearl Harbor, on December 7, 1941, the AJA (Americans of Japanese ancestry) soldiers in the Hawaii National Guard were reorganized into a new Army unit named the Hawaiian Provisional Infantry Battalion. On June 5, 1942, six months after Japan attacked Pearl Harbor, a U.S. Army transport ship Maui, quietly departed Honolulu Harbor with the 1,432 men of the unit. On June 12, 1942, just before the Battalion arrived in Oakland, California, the unit learned that it had been redesignated the 100th Infantry Battalion (Separate), meaning they were a separate unit and not part of any regiment or military unit. The men adopted "Remember Pearl Harbor" as their unit's motto. The training record of the 100th Infantry Battalion (Sep) at Camp McCoy, plus the service of the Varsity Victory Volunteers in Hawaiʻi, led the War Department to authorize the formation of the 442nd Regimental Combat Team (RCT) on February 1, 1943. Matsunaga was twice wounded in battle in Italy during World War II. He served with the renowned 442nd Regimental Combat Team and was released from the Army as a captain. Matsunaga graduated from Harvard Law School in 1951.

== Political career ==
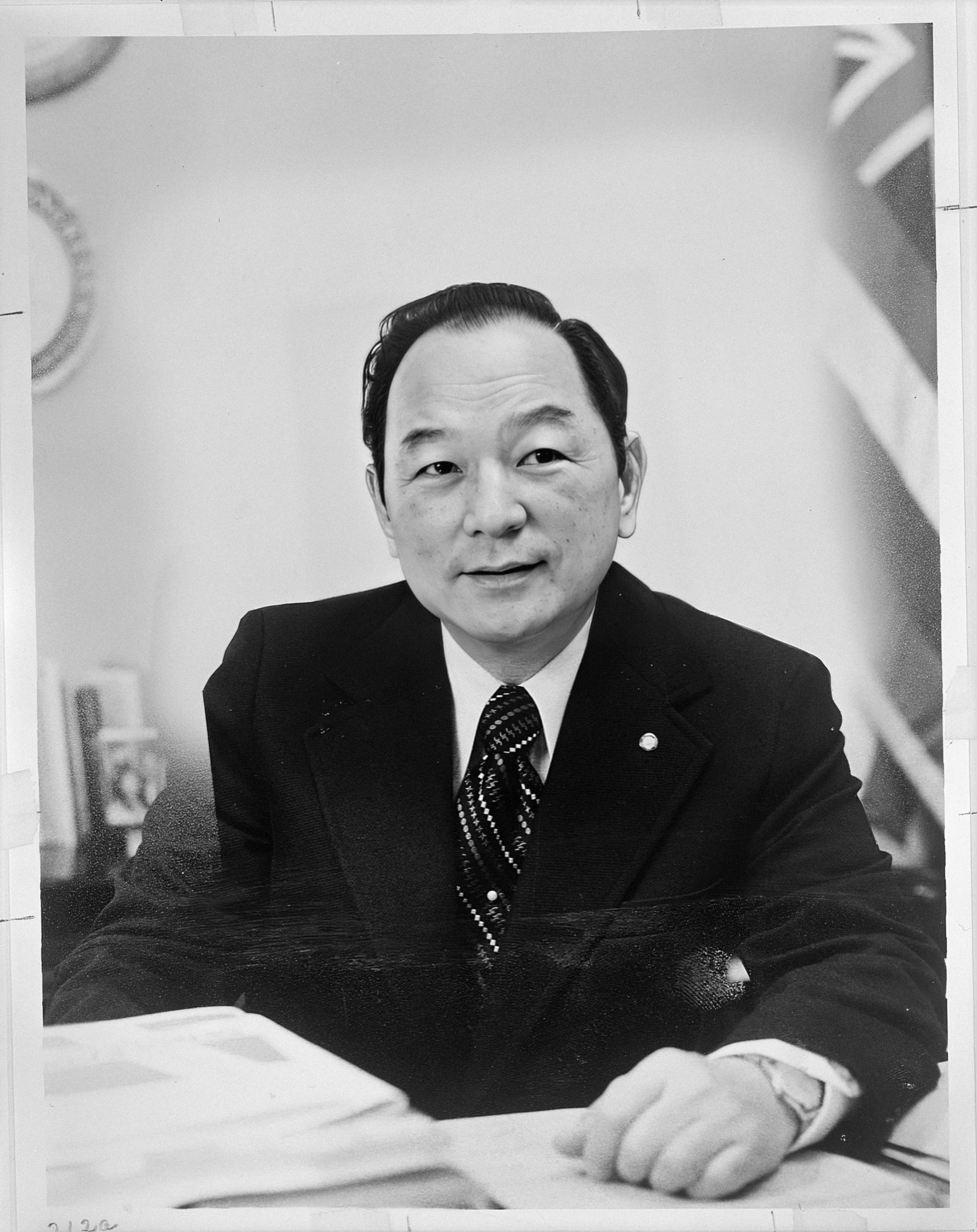
Matsunaga as a U.S. Representative in 1972.

Matsunaga served as a prosecutor and was a member of the Hawaii territorial House of Representatives.

After Daniel Inouye was elected to the Senate, Matsunaga succeeded him as the state's sole member of the House of Representatives. After Hawaii was split into districts for the 1970 elections, Matsunaga was elected for Hawaii's 1st congressional district, comprising Honolulu's inner ring, and held that seat until 1976. That year, with Hiram Fong retiring, Matsunaga defeated Hawaii's other House representative, Patsy Mink, for the Democratic Party nomination for Senator. Matsunaga then defeated former Republican governor William Quinn in the general election and went on to serve in the United States Senate from 1977 until his death in 1990.

In 1984, following many years of effort from Matsunaga, Congress passed a bill creating the U.S. Institute for Peace.

For 22 years, Matsunaga presented legislation in Congress for the creation of the position of United States Poet Laureate. In 1985, a bill was finally passed authorizing the position of Poet Laureate Consultant in Poetry to the Library of Congress.

Matsunaga was instrumental in the passage of a redress bill for people of Japanese descent who were detained in the United States during World War II. The $1.25 billion bill provided $20,000 to each detainee and also apologized to the detainees.

To the Supreme Court, Matsunaga voted to confirm Sandra Day O'Connor, Antonin Scalia, and Anthony Kennedy, all of whom were confirmed unanimously by the senate. He voted against the nomination of William Rehnquist to be Chief Justice, as well as the nomination of Robert Bork to be associate justice, the latter of which was rejected in a 58–42 vote.

In 1989, Matsunaga voted against President George H.W Bush's nomination of John Tower to be Secretary of Defense. Tower faced accusations of alcohol abuse and womanizing, and would ultimately be rejected by the Senate in a 53–47 vote.

Matsunaga was known for his sense of humor. One famous incident involved Matsunaga and then-Secretary of State Alexander Haig at a White House reception for Japanese Prime Minister Zenko Suzuki in 1981. Haig reportedly mistook Matsunaga for a member of the Japanese delegation and asked if he spoke English. Matsunaga replied, "Yes, Mr. Secretary, I do — and I had the honor of voting for your confirmation the other day."

Matsunaga was a strong advocate for Ocean Thermal Energy Conversion, introducing the very first bill in the U.S. Senate. OTEC legislation was enacted 1980.

== Personal life and death ==
Matsunaga was married to the former Helene Hatsumi Tokunaga and had three daughters and two sons.

Matsunaga had prostate cancer at the end of his life; by January 1990, he announced that the cancer had spread to his bones. He later went to Toronto General Hospital for treatment, and died there on April 15, 1990, at the age of 73. His flag-draped casket lay in state in the rotunda of the State Capitol in Honolulu. He was buried at National Memorial Cemetery of the Pacific.

== Legacy ==
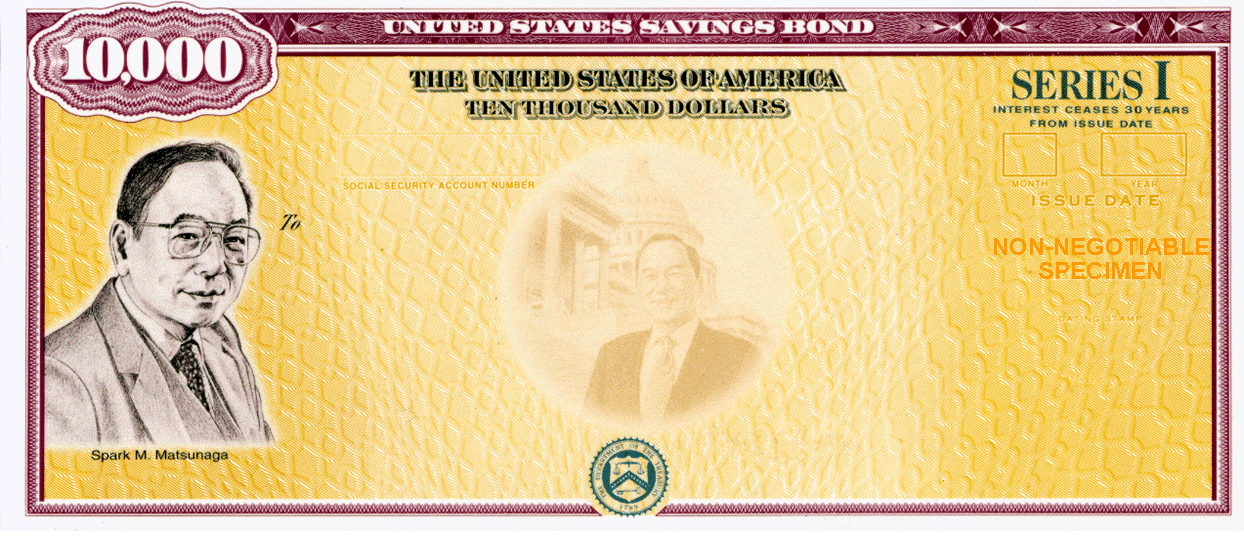
$10,000 Series I US Savings Bond featuring Spark Matsunaga

In 1997, Matsunaga's widow donated his papers to the University of Hawaiʻi at Mānoa. There were approximately 1200 boxes of material including documents, photographs, videos, and memorabilia from his 28 years in Congress. Also in the papers are professional and personal materials from his pre-Congressional life; especially noteworthy are documents, letters, photographs, and memorabilia from his Army service in the 100th Infantry Battalion.

A bronze statue honoring him is in the Spark M. Matsunaga International Children's Garden For Peace at the Storybook Theatre of Hawaii in his hometown of Hanapepe, Kauaʻi. As of 1999, Matsunaga's portrait appears on US Series I Bonds in the $10,000 denomination. There is also an elementary school in Germantown, Maryland and a VA Medical Center in Honolulu named after him.

== See also ==
- List of Asian Americans and Pacific Islands Americans in the United States Congress
- List of members of the United States Congress who died in office (1950–1999)

U.S. House of Representatives
New constituency	Member of the U.S. House of Representatives from Hawaii's at-large congressional district 1963–1971	Constituency abolished
New constituency	Member of the U.S. House of Representatives from Hawaii's 1st congressional district 1971–1977	Succeeded by Cec Heftel
Party political offices
Preceded by Cec Heftel	Democratic nominee for U.S. Senator from Hawaii (Class 1); 1976, 1982, 1988	Succeeded by Daniel Akaka
U.S. Senate
Preceded by Hiram Fong	U.S. Senator (Class 1) from Hawaii; 1977–1990; Served alongside: Dan Inouye	Succeeded by Daniel Akaka
