= Shaka (disambiguation) =

Shaka (c. 1787 – c. 1828) was the leader of the Zulu Kingdom in the early 19th century.

Shaka may also refer to:

- Saka (Sanskrit: Shaka), a Scythian tribe or group of tribes of Iranian origin
- Saka calendar, the official civil calendar in use in India
- Shaka era, a calendar era in ancient India, starting in 79 CE
- Shaka, a South African automobile brand of Advanced Automotive Design
- King Shaka International Airport, the primary airport serving Durban, South Africa
- Shaka sign, a Hawaiian hand gesture (called "Hang loose" on the US Mainland)
  - Project Shaka, a project to promote the use of the Shaka sign
  - Shaka: A Story of Aloha, a 2024 film on the gesture and the project
- Shakya (Japanese: Shaka), an ancient clan or ethnicity in the north-east of South Asia
- Shaka, the Japanese for Shakamuni or Gautama Buddha, the historical Buddha

== Persons with the given name ==
- Shaka Bangura (born 1986), a Sierra Leonean association football player
- Shaka Dee, a Trinidad and Tobago musician
- Shaka Hislop (born 1969), an English association football player
- Shaka King, (born 1980), an American film director, screenwriter, and film producer
- Shaka Loveless (born 1984), a Danish rapper and singer
- Shaka Sankofa (1963–2000), an American criminal
- Shaka Smart (born 1977), an American basketball coach
- Shaka Sola (born 1977), a Samoan shot putter and discus thrower
- Shaka Ssali (1953–2025), a Ugandan-born American journalist
- Shaka Toney (born 1998), American football player

== Persons with the surname ==
- Jah Shaka, a British musician
- Tom Shaka (born 1953), an American singer–songwriter

== Fictional characters ==
- Virgo Shaka, a character of the manga/anime Saint Seiya
- Shaka, a character central to the Star Trek: The Next Generation episode "Darmok"
- Shaaka or Shaka, played by Danny Denzongpa in the 1976 Indian film Kalicharan
- Shaka, played by Ajay Devgn in the 1996 Indian film Diljale

== See also ==
- Saka (disambiguation)
- Chaka (disambiguation)
- Shakka (disambiguation)
- Boom Shaka, a pioneering kwaito music group from South Africa
- Shaka Zulu (album), a 1987 album by South African a cappella group Ladysmith Black Mambazo
- Shaka Zulu (TV series), a 1986 television miniseries about the Zulu leader
