= Shane Victorino =

American baseball player (born 1980)

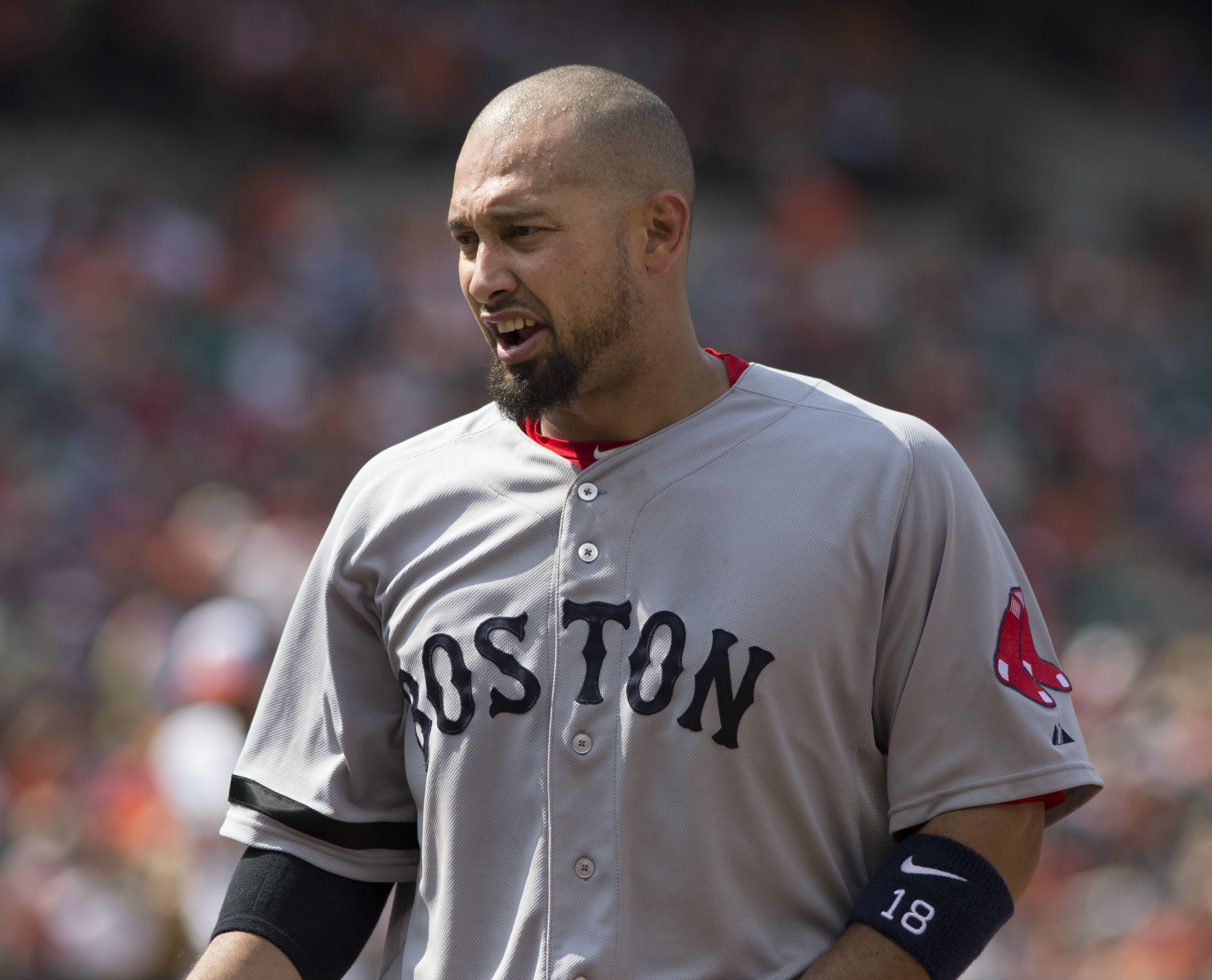
- Victorino with the Boston Red Sox in 2013
- Outfielder
- Born: November 30, 1980 (age 45); Wailuku, Hawaii, U.S.
- Batted: Switch Threw: Right

MLB debut
- April 2, 2003, for the San Diego Padres

Last MLB appearance
- October 4, 2015, for the Los Angeles Angels of Anaheim

MLB statistics
- Batting average: .275
- Home runs: 108
- Runs batted in: 489
- Stats at Baseball Reference

Teams
- San Diego Padres (2003); Philadelphia Phillies (2005–2012); Los Angeles Dodgers (2012); Boston Red Sox (2013–2015); Los Angeles Angels of Anaheim (2015)

Career highlights and awards
- 2× All-Star (2009, 2011); 2× World Series champion (2008, 2013); 4× Gold Glove Award (2008–2010, 2013)

Shane Patrick Victorino (born November 30, 1980), nicknamed "the Flyin' Hawaiian", is an American former professional baseball outfielder. He played in Major League Baseball (MLB) for the San Diego Padres, Philadelphia Phillies, Los Angeles Dodgers, Boston Red Sox, and Los Angeles Angels of Anaheim. He was primarily a switch-hitter until the 2013 season, when discomfort from various hamstring, back, and knee problems forced him to become an exclusively right-handed batter.

Victorino made his MLB debut with the Padres in 2003. He played for the Phillies from 2005 through 2012. With the Phillies, Victorino won three Gold Glove Awards, was named to two MLB All-Star Games, and was a member of the 2008 World Series champions. With the Red Sox, Victorino won his fourth Gold Glove Award and was a member of the 2013 World Series champions. He also won the Lou Gehrig Memorial Award in 2008 and the Branch Rickey Award in 2011.

== Early life ==
Victorino was born on November 30, 1980, in Wailuku, Hawaii. He is the youngest son born to Mike, Sr. and Joycelyn Victorino. When Victorino was very young he was diagnosed with attention deficit hyperactivity disorder.

Victorino played baseball, soccer, basketball and football in his youth and ran track. As a senior at St. Anthony High School in Wailuku, he won state championships in the 100, 200 and 400 meters. His 100-meter time set a state record. On the football field, he was a placekicker and slotback for head coach Charlie Ane.

Victorino signed a letter of intent to play college baseball for the Hawaii Rainbow Warriors prior to the 1999 MLB draft. After he was selected by the Los Angeles Dodgers in the sixth round, June Jones also offered Victorino a scholarship to play for the Hawaii Rainbow Warriors football team. He signed instead with Dodgers on June 8, 1999.

== Career ==
=== Los Angeles Dodgers ===
He spent the 1999 through 2002 seasons in the Dodgers minor league system, reaching Double-A with the Jacksonville Suns of the Southern League in 2002.

=== San Diego Padres ===
Victorino was selected in the 2002 Rule 5 draft by the San Diego Padres. He made his Major League debut for the Padres on April 2, 2003, as a late inning defensive replacement against the San Francisco Giants. He recorded his first at-bat the following day against the Dodgers, grounding out to third base. He did not record his first hit until April 20, when he singled to right field off Shawn Chacón of the Colorado Rockies. He played in 36 games for the Padres, posting a .151 batting average. On May 28 he was returned by the Padres to the Dodgers.

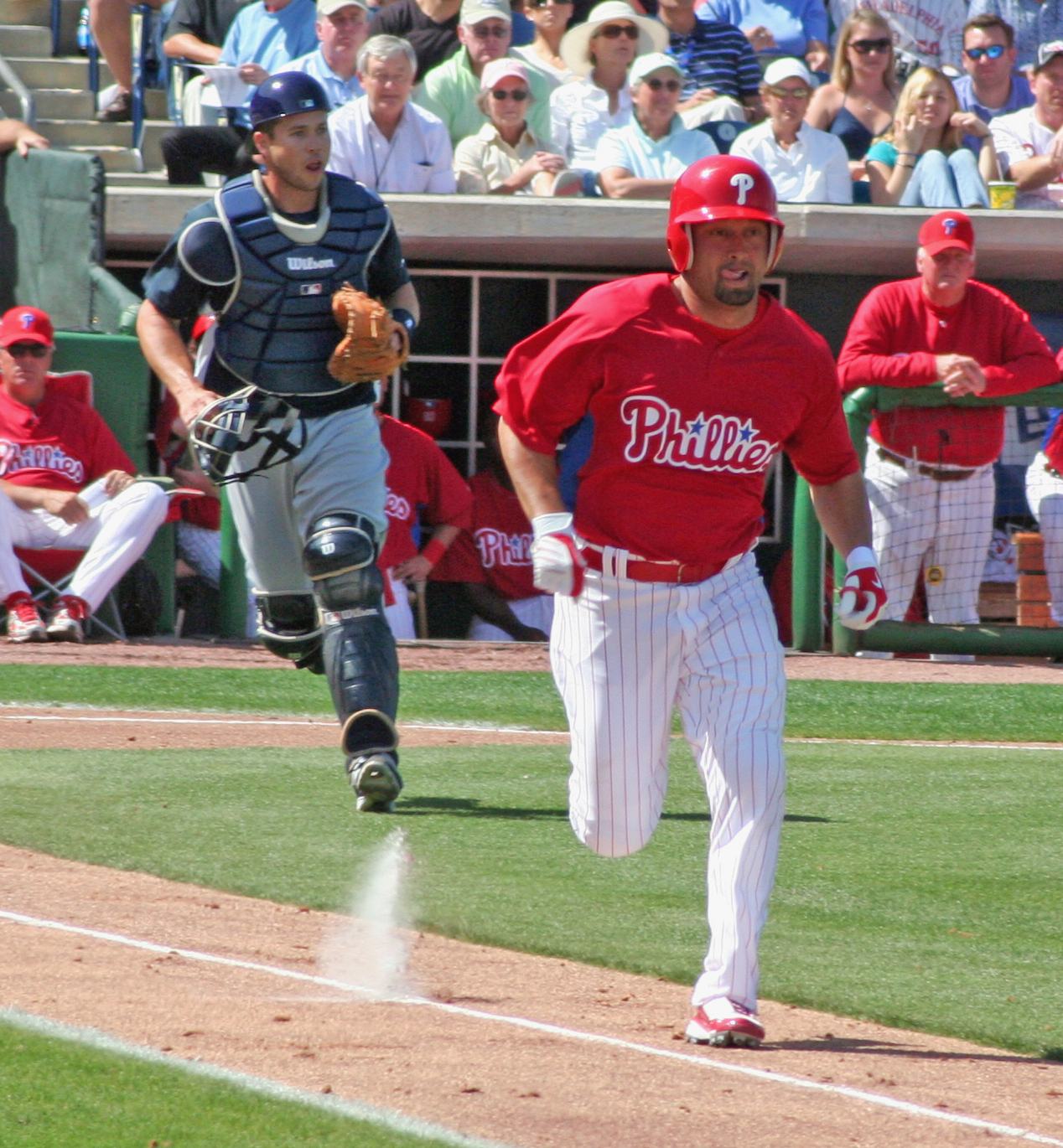
Victorino running the bases for the Philadelphia Phillies

=== Philadelphia Phillies ===
==== Minor Leagues ====
Victorino played two more seasons in the Dodgers' farm system, first with Jacksonville before moving on to the Las Vegas 51s of the Triple-A Pacific Coast League. Victorino was again selected in the Rule 5 draft, on December 13, 2004, by the Philadelphia Phillies. He again failed to stay with the major league club, and was offered back to the Dodgers. The Dodgers declined, so the Phillies retained his contract and assigned him to their Triple-A minor league club, the Scranton/Wilkes-Barre Red Barons of the International League. He hit .310 in 126 games with the Red Barons, with 18 home runs and 70 RBI, earning International League All-Star and Most Valuable Player honors. Additionally, he was selected as a Baseball America second team Minor League All-Star, a Triple-A All-Star and Phillies Minor League Player of the Year.

==== 2005 ====
Victorino received a September call-up to the Phillies and hit his first MLB home run on September 22 off Tim Hudson of the Atlanta Braves.

==== 2006 ====
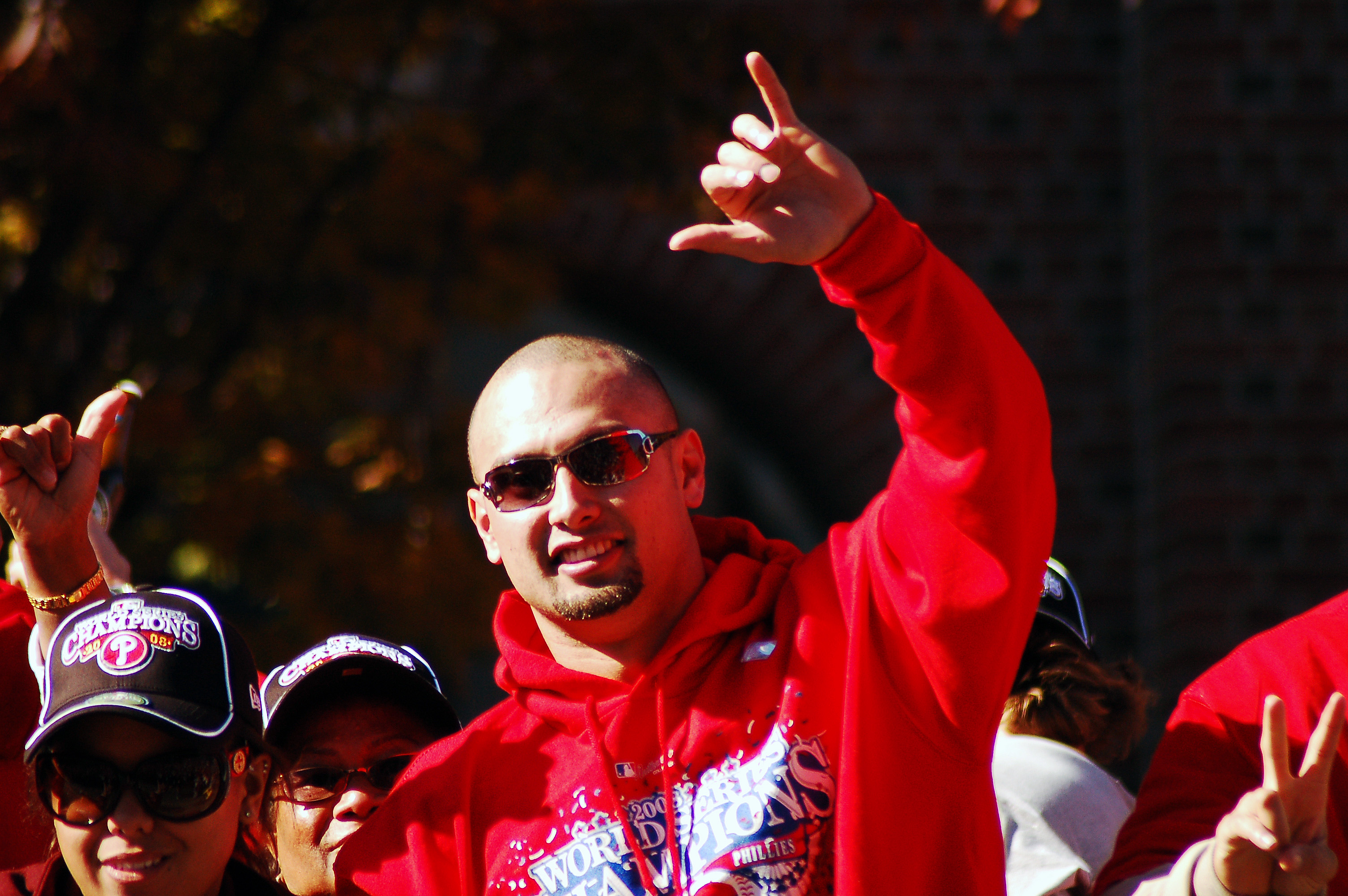
Victorino during the 2008 World Series parade, giving the shaka sign

Victorino became a starting player when he replaced Bobby Abreu midway through the 2006 season in right field.

==== 2007 ====
On June 3, 2007, the Phillies celebrated "Shane Victorino Day" with Victorino hula figurines, and flew his father in from Maui for the game. Victorino ended the day's game with a walk-off home run in the bottom of the ninth against the Giants.

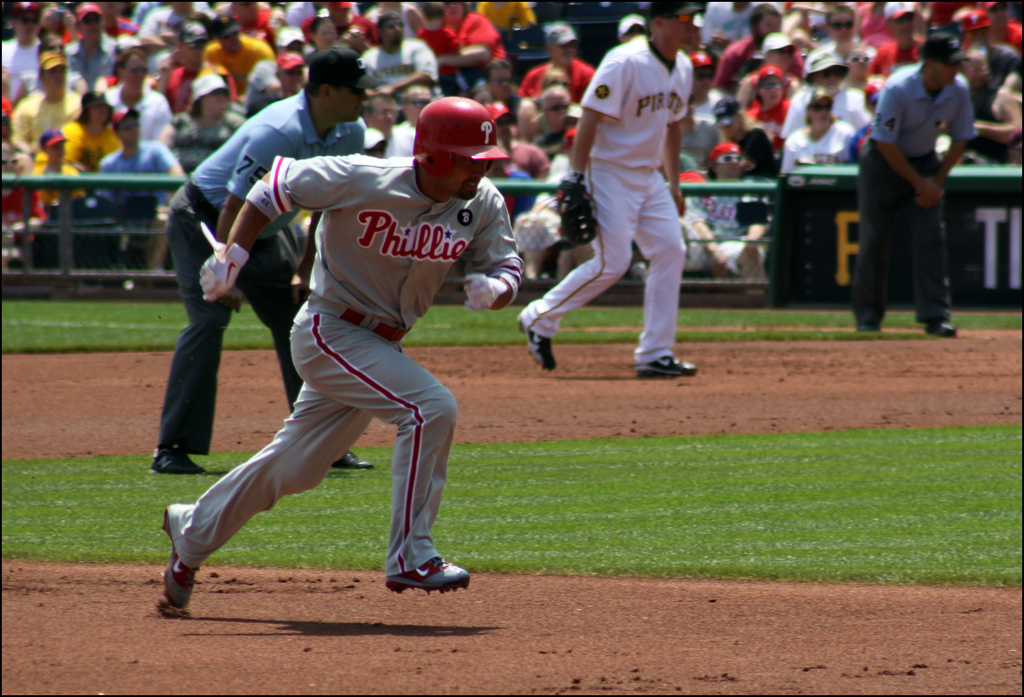
Victorino on the basepath during a 2011 game vs the Pittsburgh Pirates

==== 2008 ====
Victorino replaced Aaron Rowand, who left by free agency, in center field in 2008.

In the 2008 NLDS Game 2 against the Milwaukee Brewers, Victorino hit a grand slam (his first ever in the major leagues, and the Phillies' first postseason grand slam) off CC Sabathia in the bottom of the 2nd inning. Victorino also became the first player in postseason history to have a home run, a double, and two steals in a single game. In 2008, Victorino received the Lou Gehrig Memorial Award.

Victorino's success carried over into the 2008 NLCS, as he continued to make crucial hits and defensive plays for the Phillies. In Game 2, he was 2-for-5 with four RBIs. After the game, Victorino was informed that his grandmother had died. Game 3 saw Victorino in the midst of controversy. After being brushed back by Hiroki Kuroda, Victorino began to gesture towards the non-English-speaking pitcher that it was alright that he throw inside, just as long as he did not do so at his head. After grounding out to second, he continued to gesture at Kuroda and benches from both teams cleared. Victorino quickly became the villain for Dodger fans and was booed each time he came up to bat. After the game, Victorino was fined $2,500 by the league for his part in the incident. Victorino was quick to silence the crowd during Game 4 when he hit a game-tying two-run home run. In their first trip to the fall classic since 1993, the Phillies went on to win the 2008 World Series by defeating the Tampa Bay Rays.

==== 2009 ====
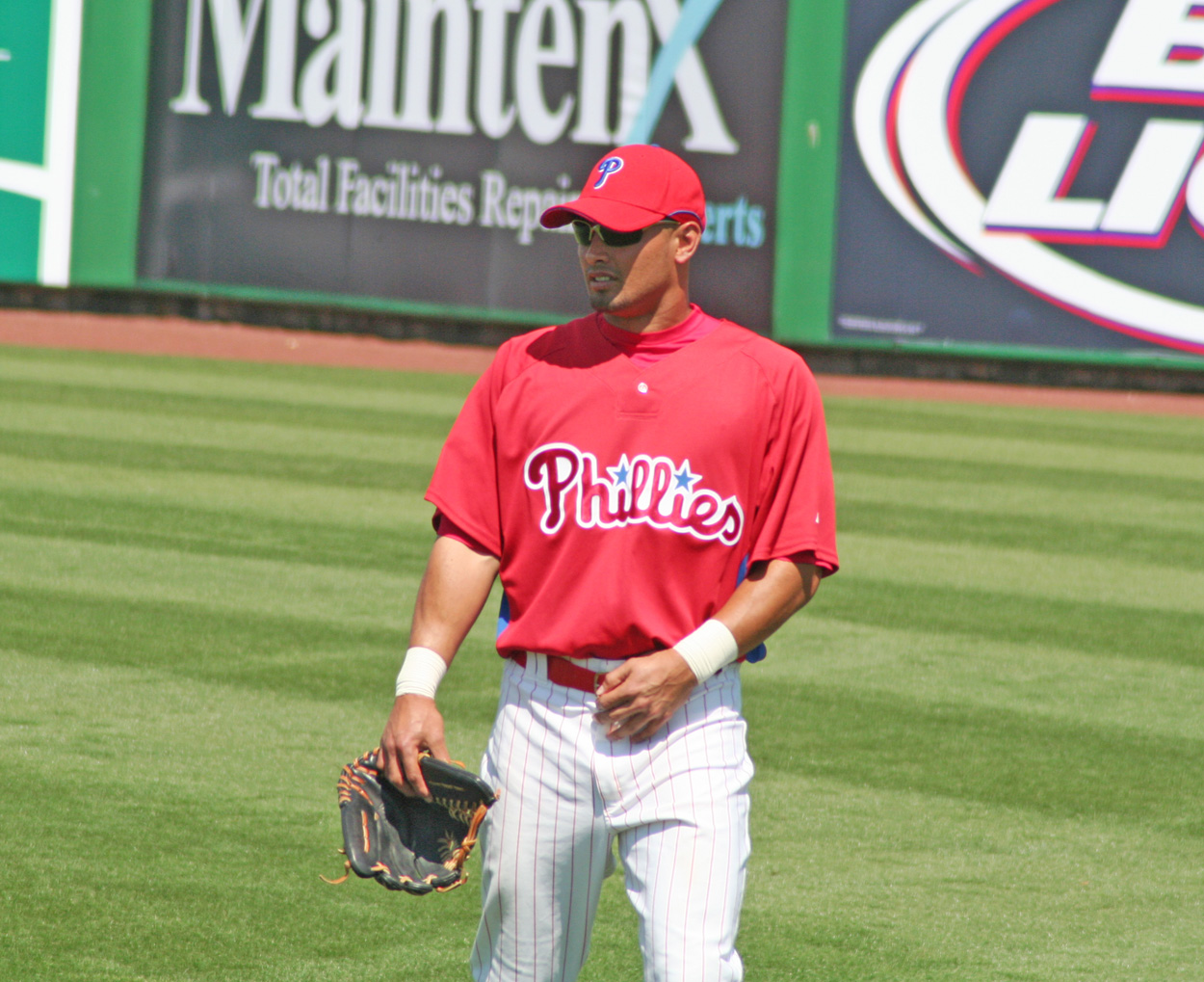
Victorino at Bright House Field

On July 9, 2009, Victorino won the All-Star Game Final Vote with a record-breaking 15.6 million votes and was named the 33rd member of the National League's 2009 All-Star team. He was the first Hawaiian-born positional player to be named to an All-Star team. On August 12, in a game against the Chicago Cubs at Wrigley Field, Victorino was hit with a full cup of beer while making a catch. A complaint was filed with the Chicago police by Victorino and the Cubs, and the fan was charged with two misdemeanor counts. For the 2009 season, Victorino's 13 triples led the majors, and he won his second consecutive Rawlings Gold Glove Award in the outfield. After the season, the Phillies and Victorino agreed to a three-year contract extension, avoiding salary arbitration and buying out his first year of free agency.

==== 2010 ====
In 2010, Victorino set career highs with 18 home runs and 69 RBIs. He also led all National League outfielders with 11 assists and won his third consecutive Gold Glove Award. In the first inning of the clinching Game 3 of the 2010 NLDS against Cincinnati, Victorino made a superb running-and-reaching catch of a line drive in the alley. Without that catch, the game would have been tied, 1–1, with the hitter now on second and a possible big inning for the Reds. Instead, the catch preserved a 1–0 lead. However, in the NLCS, Victorino posted a mere .208 batting average with just two RBIs and six strikeouts against the eventual World Series Champion San Francisco Giants. In 2010, he received the Tug McGraw "Good Guy Award" from the Philadelphia chapter of the Baseball Writers' Association of America.

==== 2011 ====
In September 2011, Victorino was named the winner of the Branch Rickey Award by the Rotary Club of Denver.

==== 2012 ====
In 2012 with the Phillies, Victorino played in 101 games and hit .261 with nine homers, 40 RBI and 24 steals.

=== Second stint with the Dodgers ===
==== Remainder of 2012 ====
Victorino was traded back to the Dodgers on July 31, 2012, for Josh Lindblom, Ethan Martin and a player to be named later, who later turned out to be grandson of Dodgers Hall of Fame Spanish announcer Stefan Jarrín. Victorino played in 53 games with the Dodgers, primarily in left field and hit .245 with two homers, 15 RBI and 15 steals.

=== Boston Red Sox ===
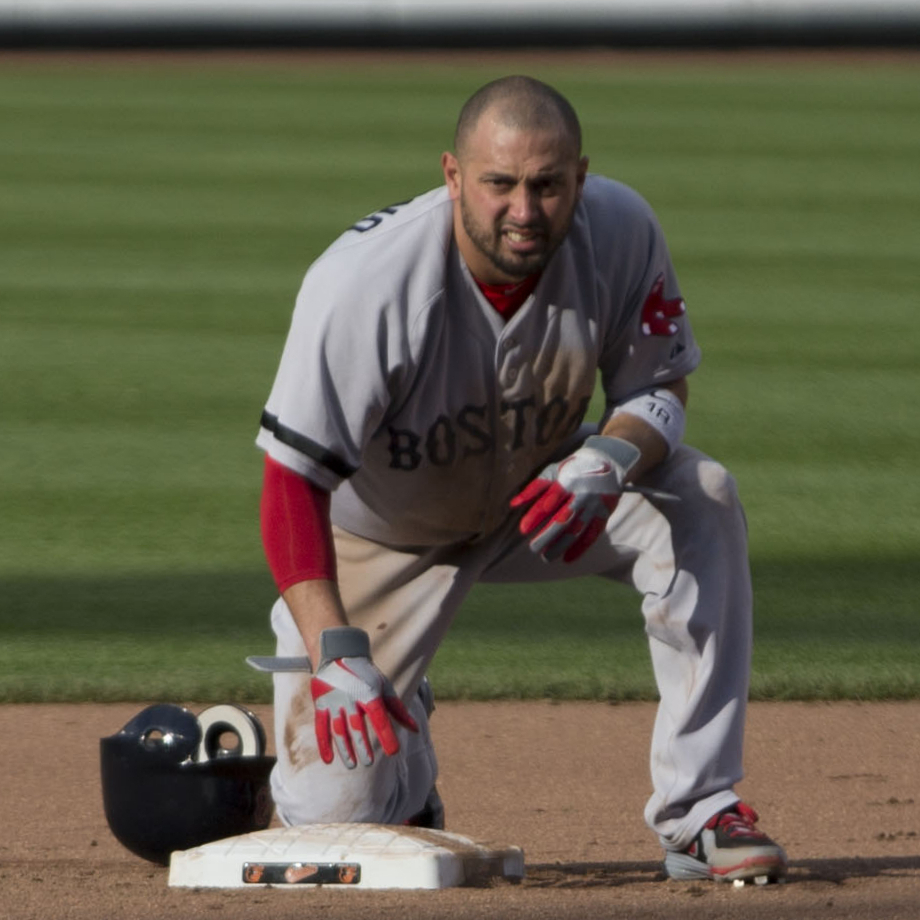
Victorino with the Red Sox in 2013

On December 13, 2012, Victorino signed a three-year, $39 million contract with the Boston Red Sox.

==== 2013 ====
On May 12, 2013, Victorino collided with the right field wall and was injured. However, he stayed in the game for two more innings. He was placed on the disabled list on May 24 (retroactive to May 21) with a hamstring strain, and re-activated on June 8.

Victorino was named AL Player of the Week for July 29–August 4.

On October 19, 2013, Victorino hit a go-ahead grand slam in the bottom of the seventh inning, over the Green Monster, in Game 6 of the ALCS. The grand slam put the Red Sox up 5–2 over the Detroit Tigers, and sent the Red Sox to the World Series. He became the second player to have hit two postseason grand slams, joining Jim Thome.

Victorino received the American League Gold Glove Award for his outstanding play in right field. He compiled a 25.0 UZR (Ultimate Zone Rating) and had 264 putouts along with 9 assists.

On Wednesday, October 30, Victorino won his second World Series ring, as the Red Sox defeated the St. Louis Cardinals in the 2013 World Series. In that clinching game, Victorino drove in four of the Red Sox's six runs, three of which came on a bases-clearing double off the Green Monster in the third inning.

==== 2014 ====
On April 30, 2014, Victorino and teammate Will Middlebrooks returned from injury to Fenway Park, in a game where the Red Sox won 7–4 against Tampa Bay Rays.

Victorino only played in 30 games in 2014, spending much of the 2014 season on the disabled list. He batted exclusively right-handed in those 30 games. He had season-ending lumbar discectomy back surgery on August 5.

==== 2015 ====
On April 25, 2015, Victorino was placed on the 15-day disabled list due to a hamstring strain.

=== Los Angeles Angels ===
On July 27, 2015, Victorino was traded to the Los Angeles Angels of Anaheim, along with $3.8 million in cash considerations, for infielder Josh Rutledge. He made 71 appearances split between the Red Sox and Angels, hitting .230 with seven RBI and one home run. Victorino filed for free agency on November 2.

=== Chicago Cubs ===
Victorino signed a minor league deal with the Chicago Cubs in February 2016. He was released on March 29, but re-signed with the team on a minor league deal the same day. He was released for a second time on May 23 and did not sign with another team.

=== Retirement ===
On July 3, 2018, Victorino formally announced his retirement. On August 3, he signed a one-day contract with Philadelphia so he could retire as a member of the Phillies.

=== Post-playing career ===
On May 19, 2023, Victorino made an appearance and doubled for the Savannah Bananas when they played in Las Vegas.

On October 9, 2025, Victorino was announced as the "primetime coach" of the Loco Beach Coconuts, the newest team (along with the revival of the former Negro Leagues Indianapolis Clowns) in the Bananaball Championship League.

On July 2, 2026, Victorino was announced as the manager for the National League at the All-Star Futures Game.

== Personal life ==
Victorino is the son of former Maui County Mayor Mike Victorino, and is an Eagle Scout. His father is a former State Representative in Hawaii and the current Supreme Warden for the Knights of Columbus, and Shane is a member.

Victorino and Melissa Smith wed in November 2009. On March 30, 2007, Smith gave birth to their first child, a daughter, and on October 1, 2010, she gave birth to their son. During the off-seasons they live in Las Vegas.

Victorino is of Portuguese, Hawaiian, Japanese, and English descent. His last name is of Portuguese origin. In an interview with The Philadelphia Inquirer in 2011, he explained: "My name is really Victorine, which is Portuguese. My great-great-grandpa, when he was in the war, they spelled his name with an O at the end instead of an E, and it became Victorino." He is a Sansei or third-generation Japanese-American on his mother's side. Former Major League pitcher Kanekoa Texeira is a distant cousin of Victorino.

Victorino is a fan of reggae musician Bob Marley, and used Marley's songs "Buffalo Soldier" and "Three Little Birds" as at-bat music when he played for the Phillies and Red Sox, respectively. The crowd at Fenway Park would typically sing along with the chorus of "Three Little Birds" whenever Victorino came to bat. When Victorino was traded to the Angels, he ceased using "Three Little Birds" as his at-bat music out of respect for the Red Sox and their fans.

Victorino had a brief acting role in an episode of Hawaii Five-0, playing a character called Shaun.

== See also ==
- List of Gold Glove Award winners at outfield
- List of Major League Baseball annual triples leaders
- 2021 Baseball Hall of Fame balloting
