= Apana =

Apana may refer to:

- Apāna, one of the five vital Prāṇas

== People with the surname Apana ==
- Chang Apana (1871–1933), a Chinese-Hawaiian member of the Honolulu Police Department
- James Apana, also known as Kimo Apana, Mayor of the County of Maui in Hawaii from 1999 to 2003

== See also ==
- Lake Apanás, a reservoir located in the north of Nicaragua
