= Chaka =

Chaka may refer to:

== People ==
- Shaka (1787–1828), Zulu king
- Chaka (tagger) (born 1972), American graffiti artist
- Chaka Bey (died c. 1093), Turkish emir and adventurer
- Chaka of Bulgaria (died 1300), tsar of Bulgaria from 1299 to 1300
- Chaka Khan (born 1953), American singer
- Andrew Verdecchio (born 1974), American musician
- Yvonne Chaka Chaka (born 1965), South African singer
- Chaka (born 1960), Japanese singer, member of the band Psy-S

=== Given name ===
- Chaka Daley (born 1974), Canadian football (soccer) player and coach
- Chaka Demus (born 1963), Jamaican reggae musician and DJ
- Chaka Fattah (born 1956), former American politician
- Chaka Seisay, American musician

== Entertainment and literature ==
- Chaka (album), a 1978 album by Chaka Khan
- Chaka (film), a 2000 Bengali film
- Chaka (novel), a novel by the writer Thomas Mofolo of Lesotho
- "Cha-Ka", an episode of the 1974 series Land of the Lost

=== Fictional characters ===
- Chaka (comics), a fictional character in the Marvel Universe
- Chaka (One Piece), a character from the anime and manga One Piece
- Chaka (Stargate), an Unas from the sci-fi television show Stargate SG-1
- Cha-Ka, a character from Land of the Lost, a 1974 sci-fi television show
- Chaka, a character from the short lived MTV animated Downtown
- Billy Chaka, a character in novels by Isaac Adamson

== Other uses ==
- Chaka (food), a yogurt-based cheese popular in Afghanistan and Tajikistan
- Tchaka, or Chaka, a savory Haitian corn soup
- Chaka (genus), a genus of skeleton shrimp in the family Caprellidae
- Chaka, Ulan County, Qinghai, China
- 1246 Chaka, a main-belt asteroid
- Baeolidia chaka, a species of sea slug
- Cacán, a language spoken in Argentina historically called Chaka

== See also ==
- Chika (disambiguation)
- Shaka (disambiguation)
- Chakka (disambiguation)
