= Richard Bissen =

American jurist and mayor (born 1962)

Richard T. Bissen Jr.
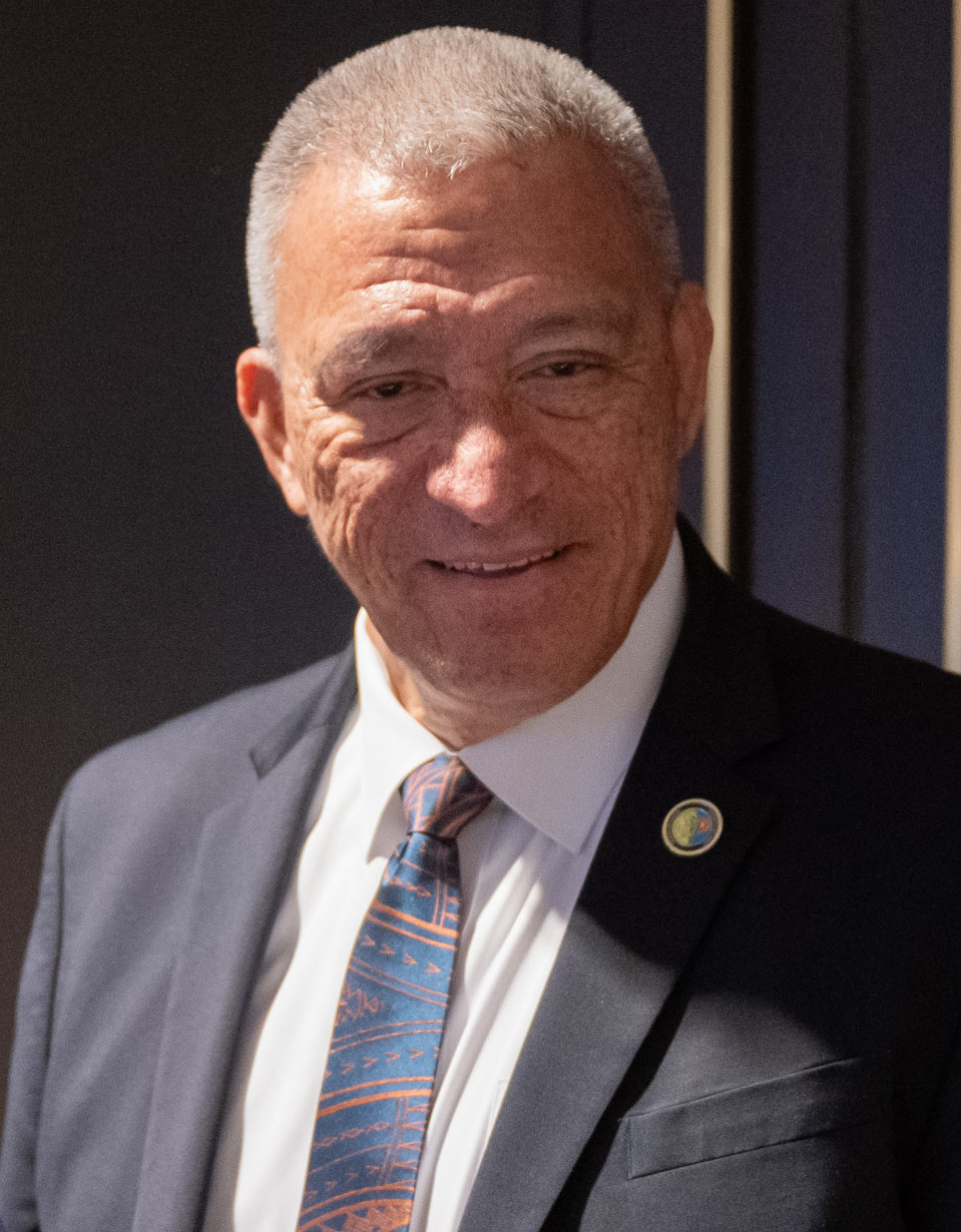
- Bissen in 2024

Mayor of Maui County
- Incumbent
- Assumed office January 3, 2023
- Preceded by: Mike Victorino

Judge of the 2nd Hawaii State Circuit Court
- In office 2005 – December 2021
- Nominated by: Linda Lingle; David Ige

Personal details
- Born: Richard Thomas Bissen Jr. March 25, 1962 (age 64) Maui, Hawaii
- Spouse: Isabella
- Children: 3
- Education: Santa Clara University (BS); University of Hawaiʻi at Mānoa (JD)

Richard Thomas Bissen Jr. (born March 25, 1962) is a former prosecuting attorney and retired jurist serving since 2023 as mayor of Maui County, Hawaii.

== Early life and education ==
Bissen was born on Maui to a Native Hawaiian family and grew up in Wailuku. He graduated from St. Anthony High School, then earned a Bachelor of Science in political science from the University of Santa Clara (now known as Santa Clara University) in 1983 and a Juris Doctor from UH Mānoa's William S. Richardson School of Law in 1986.

== Career ==
In 2005, Governor Linda Lingle nominated Bissen to serve as a judge for the second judicial circuit. Governor David Ige renominated him in 2015, and he retired from the judiciary in 2021.

In January 2022, Bissen announced his candidacy for mayor of Maui County. He placed first in the primaries, receiving about 34.7% of the vote, with incumbent Mike Victorino finishing second. Maui County elections are nonpartisan, with the top two candidates moving on to the general election. Bissen defeated Victorino in the general election with 61.4% of the vote.
