= Alan Arakawa =

5th and 7th Mayor of Maui (born 1951)

5th and 7th Mayor of Maui
- In office January 2, 2011 – January 3, 2019
- Preceded by: Charmaine Tavares
- Succeeded by: Mike Victorino
- In office January 2, 2003 – January 2, 2007
- Preceded by: James "Kimo" Apana
- Succeeded by: Charmaine Tavares

Personal details
- Born: 1951 (age 74–75) Wailuku, Maui, Hawaii, U.S.
- Party: Democratic (since 2017); Republican (before 2017)
- Spouse: Ann Arakawa
- Children: 2
- Education: University of Hawaiʻi at Mānoa
- Profession: Politician

Alan M. Arakawa (born 1951) is an American politician who served as the fifth and seventh mayor of the County of Maui in Hawaii.

== Education ==
Arakawa graduated from Maui High School and attended the University of Hawaiʻi at Mānoa as a business major.

== Career ==
In 1984, Arakawa entered civil service as a wastewater plant worker for Maui County and eventually was promoted to supervisor in the wastewater division of the Maui County Department of Public Works. Arakawa also represented labor unions, serving as a United Public Workers chief steward and a Hawaii Government Employees Association union representative. He served on the Maui County Council in 1994, 1996, and 2000.

=== Elections ===
==== 2002 mayoral election ====
Arakawa first ran for mayor in 2002. After placing second in the September 21, 2002 primary behind former Maui mayor Kimo Apana, Arakawa won the general election with 20,887 votes (50.3%).

==== 2006 mayoral election ====
In 2006, Arakawa ran for reelection. In the primaries he faced Apana again and city councilmember Charmaine Tavares, daughter of the late mayor Hannibal Tavares. In the primary, he trailed Tavares by about 100 votes. In the general election, he was defeated by Tavares.

==== 2010 mayoral election ====
On June 18, 2010, Arakawa filed to run for the Mayor of Maui County. He placed second in the mayoral primary election on September 18, 2010. Incumbent mayor Charmaine Tavares narrowly won the primary election with 7,307 votes, or 25.4% of the total. She defeated Arakawa by just 268 votes. Arakawa earned 7,039 votes, or 24.4% of the vote. Arakawa won 23 of Maui's 39 election precincts, mostly in South and West Maui, while Tavares won 11 precincts in Central Maui.

Both Tavares and Arakawa qualified for the 2010 mayoral general election on November 2, 2010. The race was a rematch of the 2006 mayoral election, in which incumbent mayor Arakawa was defeated by Tavares. In the final vote tally, Arakawa defeated Tavares with nearly 59% of the vote to her 41%.

==== 2014 mayoral election ====
In the general election on November 4, 2014, Arakawa won reelection with 25,435 votes (55.3%) over Tam Paltin.

==== 2018 election ====
In May 2017, Arakawa announced he would run for lieutenant governor of Hawaii. But in November 2017, he changed course and said he would instead run for his former seat on the Maui County Council representing Kahului.

In the August 11 primary, Arakawa received 11,790 votes, second to community organizer Natalie "Tasha" Kama's 12,712 votes. Arakawa lost to Kama in the November 6 general election by nearly 11,000 votes.

== Personal life ==
Arakawa is married to Ann Arakawa, assistant professor of mathematics at the University of Hawaiʻi Maui College. They have two daughters, Jan and Jodi.
