= Project Shaka =

Hawaiʻi-based civic initiative promoting the shaka gesture

Project Shaka is an American civic initiative of Honolulu-based 501(c)(3) nonprofit ID8 that works to share Aloha Spirit through the shaka hand gesture. Its activities include the production of Shaka: A Story of Aloha, an educational documentary on the origin, meanings and uses of the shaka gesture, advocacy that culminated in passage of a 2024 Hawaiʻi law designating the shaka the official state gesture, and community programs such as a specialty shaka license plate and a shaka-based classroom curriculum.

== History ==
Project Shaka developed alongside the feature documentary Shaka: A Story of Aloha, produced by ID8, which explores the gesture's history and cultural meanings and traces competing origin accounts. The film premiered at the Visual Communications (LA Asian Pacific) Film Festival on May 2, 2024, and later screened at the Hawaiʻi International Film Festival (HIFF) in October–November 2024. HIFF subsequently announced the documentary as its Audience Choice Award winner for Best Documentary Feature in 2024.

In 2024, Project Shaka founder Steve Sue wrote a bill, unanimously approved by the Hawaiʻi Legislature and signed into law by Governor Josh Green, designating the shaka as the State's official gesture—the first state gesture in the United States. The law also authorizes the State Foundation on Culture and the Arts to develop a public work of art related to the shaka and its history.

== Programs ==
=== Specialty license plate ===
In May 2024, counties in Hawaiʻi began offering a license plate featuring the shaka gesture under the statewide nonprofit plate framework; local outlets reported statewide availability on and after May 23, 2024. On Oʻahu, the City and County of Honolulu lists "Project Shaka" among organizational plate options, with an initial fee of $30.50 and a $25 annual renewal, of which $20 is directed to ID8, the sponsoring organization. Project Shaka's plate page describes over-the-counter exchanges at county DMVs and availability on all major islands.

=== Education and curriculum ===
Project Shaka describes a free social–emotional learning curriculum developed with the Jesse Lewis Choose Love Movement that incorporates film clips from the documentary. Regional outlets reported that educator trainings and classroom rollout began in late 2024, including partnerships with the Hawaiʻi Department of Education.

=== Documentary outreach ===
The movement organizes screenings and outreach tied to the documentary Shaka: A Story of Aloha, which features interviews with historians, cultural practitioners, athletes and community members and was exhibited at festivals in 2024.

=== Stickers and community outreach ===
Project Shaka operates a free sticker program intended to promote positive interactions; the initiative offers stickers in multiple sizes and distributes them on request.

=== Workshops ===
The initiative offers workshops for corporate, nonprofit and adult learners framed around "solutions with aloha," emphasizing teamwork, leadership and communication.

=== Monuments and public art ===
Project Shaka proposes a "Share a Shaka" monuments program; the 2024 statute separately authorizes the State Foundation on Culture and the Arts to develop a public work of art related to the shaka and its history.

=== Emoji application ===
Project Shaka also describes efforts to create a distinct "shaka" emoji, distinguishing it from the existing "call me" hand emoji.

== Organization ==
Project Shaka is produced by ID8 (ide•ate), a Honolulu-based 501(c)(3) nonprofit organization; ID8's tax-exempt status is listed in ProPublica's Nonprofit Explorer.

== Reception ==
Coverage of the 2024 proposal and adoption of the shaka as the state gesture provided broader context on the symbol's cultural role and public response, with several outlets noting advocacy and awareness efforts tied to the film and Project Shaka.
