= Shakka =

Shakka may refer to:

- Shakka (film), 1981 Bollywood Action film
- Shakka (god), Babylonian and Akkadian patron god of herdsmen
- Shakka (singer), British singer, songwriter and producer

== See also ==
- Shaka (disambiguation)
