= Charmaine Tavares =

American politician (born 1943)

6th Mayor of Maui
- In office January 2, 2007 – January 2, 2011
- Preceded by: Alan Arakawa
- Succeeded by: Alan Arakawa

Personal details
- Born: 1943 (age 82–83) Hana, Hawaii, U.S.
- Party: Democratic
- Relations: Hannibal Tavares (father)
- Education: University of Hawaii at Manoa
- Profession: Teacher, counselor, politician

Charmaine Tavares (born 1943 Hana, Hawaii) is an American politician and teacher. Tavares served as the Mayor of Maui from January 2007 to January 2011. She unsuccessfully sought a second four-year term in office in the 2010 Maui mayoral election.

== Biography ==
=== Early life ===
Tavares was born in 1943 in Hana, Hawaii, in eastern Maui, to Hannibal and Harriet Tavares. Her father, Hannibal Tavares, served as the mayor of Maui from 1979 until 1991, the longest tenure of any Maui mayor to date. Tavares is the descendant of Japanese and Portuguese immigrants who settled in Hawaii. Her mother, Harriet, is of Japanese descent and her father, Hannibal Tavares, was of Portuguese descent.

She attended both Kaunoa Elementary School and Maul High School, before graduating from St Anthony High School. Tavares earned a bachelor's degree in education from the University of Hawaii at Manoa in 1967. She also received a fifth-year professional diploma in education from the University of Hawaii at Manoa in 1970.

=== Career ===
Tavares worked in Hawaiian public schools as a teacher, counselor and athletic director from 1967 to 1982. She was the program director of the Maui Community College (MCC) Upward Bound program from 1983 to 1989.

Tavares served as the director of the Department of Parks and Recreation for Maui County from 1989 to 1995.

=== Maui County Council ===
Tavares was first elected to the Maui County Council in 1996. She served on the Council, representing the Upcountry Seat, from 1997 until 2006. She was elected to the Maui County Council in five separate elections.

=== Mayor of Maui ===
Tavares was elected mayor of Maui in the 2006 election. She defeated incumbent Mayor Alan Arakawa and was sworn into office on January 2, 2007.

Tavares ran for reelection to a second four-year term in 2010. The primary election was held on September 18. Tavares narrowly won, taking 7,307 votes, or 25.4% of the total. She defeated her nearest opponent, former Maui Mayor Alan Arakawa, by 268 votes. Tavares and Arakawa automatically advanced to the general election as the two top vote-getters in the primary. Electric contractor Randy Piltz placed fourth with 5,602 votes (19.4%); Chris Hart placed fifth with 3,035 (10.5%); Maui Council member Sol Kaho'ohalahala came in sixth place with 2,912 votes (10.1%); businessman Marc Hodges placed seventh with 1,761 votes (6.1%). Five other candidates earned a combined 1.5% of the vote.

Tavares won 11 of Maui's 39 election precincts in the 2010 primary. Most of these precincts were in Central Maui. Former Mayor Alan Arakawa won 23 precincts in South Maui and West Maui.

Tavares faced Arakawa in the general election on November 2, 2010. The election was a rematch of the 2006 Maui mayoral election, in which Tavares defeated Arakawa. Tavares did not fare as well in the rematch, becoming one of the only Democrats in Hawaii to lose reelection to a Republican.
