= Elmer Cravalho =

American politician (1926–2016)

1st Mayor of Maui
- In office January 2, 1969 – July 24, 1979
- Preceded by: Office created
- Succeeded by: Hannibal Tavares

1st Speaker of the Hawaii House of Representatives
- In office 1959–1967
- Preceded by: O. Vincent Esposito (Territorial House)
- Succeeded by: Tadao Beppu

Personal details
- Born: February 19, 1926 Paia, Hawaii, U.S.
- Died: June 27, 2016 (aged 90) Kahului, Hawaii, U.S.
- Party: Democratic
- Profession: Politician

Elmer Franklin Cravalho (February 19, 1926 – June 27, 2016) was an American politician and teacher. A member of the Democratic Party, Cravalho served as the first Mayor of Maui from 1969 to 1979 and the first Speaker of the Hawaii House of Representatives following statehood.

Cravalho was the descendant of Portuguese immigrants who settled in Hawaii.

== Life and career ==
Born in Paia, Hawaii, Cravalho received his bachelor's degree in education from University of Hawaiʻi, in 1947. He taught school and was a school principal. Later, he was in the insurance and banking business. He was also involved with the credit union movement, farming, and ranching.

Cravalho began his political career in 1955 as a member of Hawaii's territorial House of Representatives. He served as the first House Speaker (1959–1967) following statehood, a delegate to the 1960 Democratic National Convention, Maui mayor and chairman of the Maui Board of Water Supply.

Much of Maui's development can be traced to Cravalho's term as mayor. In the 1970s, he was responsible for developing the waterline from Wailuku to Wailea, which enabled the development of Kihei.

Cravalho had a part in the formation of Maui Economic Opportunity Inc., a private, nonprofit organization chartered in 1965 to help low-income elderly, children and youth, persons with disabilities, immigrants, other disadvantaged people and the general public to help themselves.

Cravalho left office suddenly in 1979, just months after winning re-election for a third full term in the 1978 election. Democrat Hannibal Tavares won a special election in October 1979 to complete the remainder of Cravalho's term.

He ran for a non-consecutive fourth term in the 1990 election, but lost in an upset to Linda Lingle, who would later go on to become Governor of Hawaii in 2002 and 2006.

== Death ==
Cravalho died on June 27, 2016.
