= Mike Victorino =

8th Mayor of Maui (born 1952)

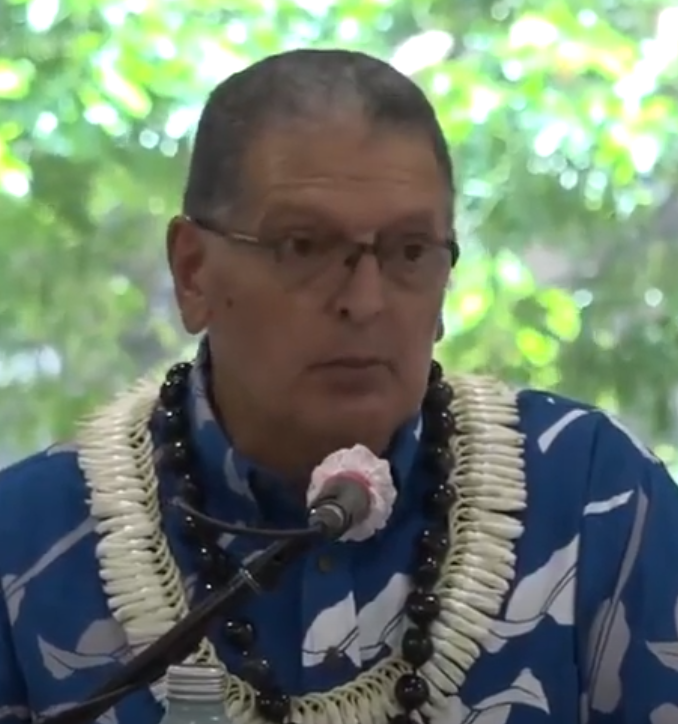

8th Mayor of Maui
- In office January 3, 2019 – January 2, 2023
- Preceded by: Alan Arakawa
- Succeeded by: Richard Bissen

Wailuku Councilmember, Maui County
- In office 2006–2017
- Succeeded by: Alika Atay

Personal details
- Born: Michael Paul Victorino; August 24, 1952 (age 74) Hawaiʻi Island, Territory of Hawaii, U.S.
- Spouse: Joycelyn M. Victorino
- Children: Mike Jr.; Shane
- Education: Hilo College
- Occupation: Politician; businessmen

Michael Paul Victorino (born August 24, 1952) is an American businessman and politician, who served as the eighth Mayor of the County of Maui.

In November 2017, he announced intentions to run for county council mayor, ultimately defeating Council Member Cochran. Victorino also previously served as Wailuku's council member from 2006 to 2017. He and his wife Joycelyn have two children, including retired Major League Baseball player, Shane Victorino. He was defeated by Richard Bissen in the 2022 election.

== Personal life ==
Mike Victorino was born on the island of Hawaii on August 24, 1952. He spent his high school years on Lānaʻi, working in the pineapple fields. Victorino studied business administration from Hawaiʻi Community College and Hilo College (now University of Hawaiʻi at Hilo). Victorino worked for Zales, helping to open a location on Maui in 1973.

Victorino left Zales the following year, to work for McDonald's. Through working at McDonald's, he met his future wife, Joycelyn Nakahashi. Michael and Joycelyn Victorino got married in 1976. They have two sons, Michael Jr. (born 1976) and Shane (born 1980). Shane Victorino is a retired professional Major League Baseball player.

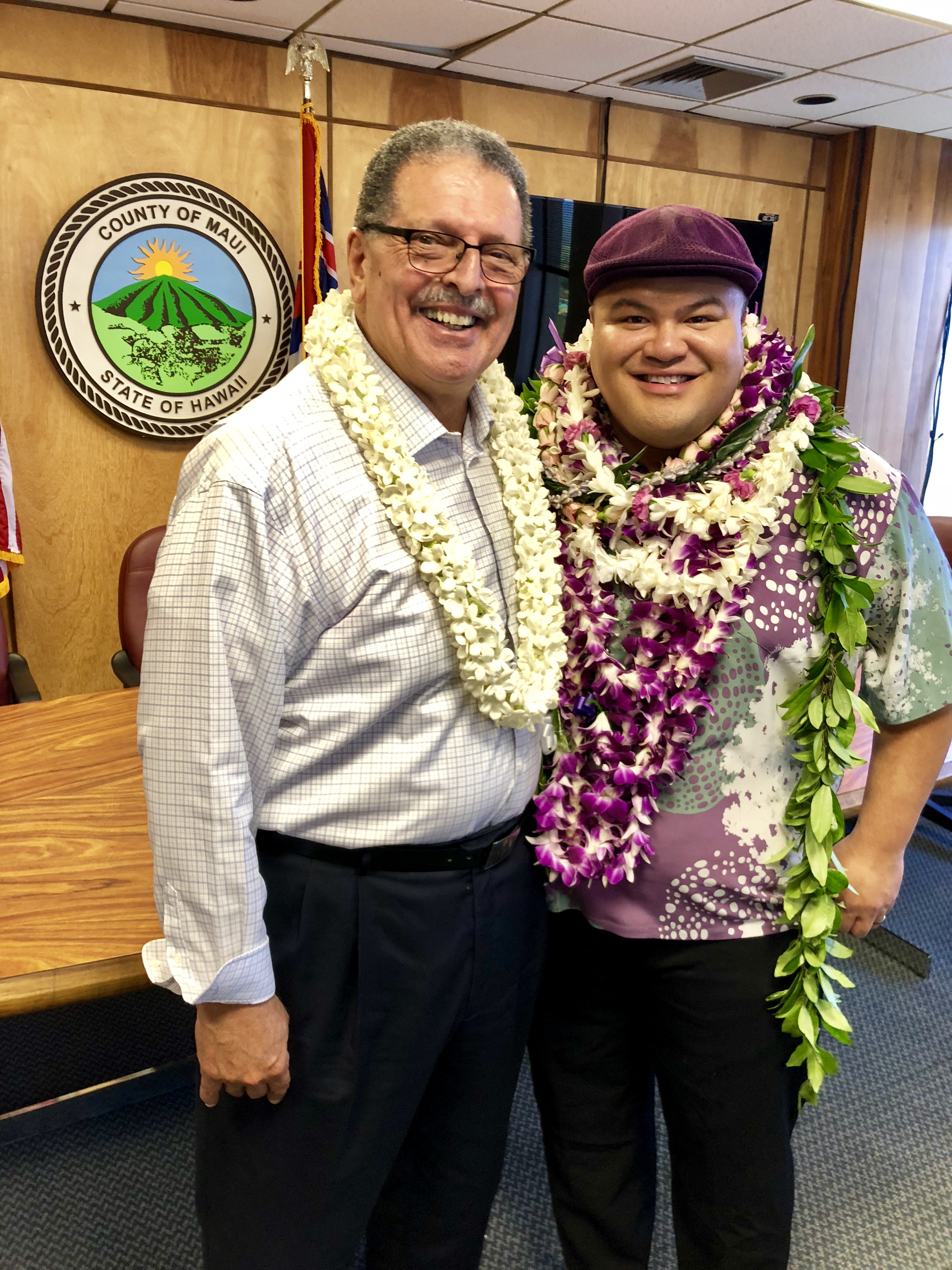
Maui Mayor Michael Victorino & Kalani Peʻa

== 2018 mayoral race ==
Maui County mayoral elections are held every four years, with County Mayors being limited to two consecutive terms. As Alan Arakawa had already served two terms consecutively, he was ineligible to seek reelection. On November 6, 2017, Victorino announced his intention to run for mayor. Maui County primaries are nonpartisan, with the top two candidates moving on to the general election. Victorino received the most votes in the 2018 primary, receiving 39.9% of the popular vote. His general election opponent, Council Member Elle Cochran received 30.6% of the popular vote in the primary. Victorino received 54.1% of the popular vote, defeating Council Member Cochran by a margin of 10.8%.
