= Chakka =

Chakka may refer to:

- Jackfruit in the Malayalam language
- Strained yogurt in India and Pakistan

== See also ==
- Chaka (disambiguation)
