= Mayor of Maui County =

Chief executive of Maui County, Hawaii

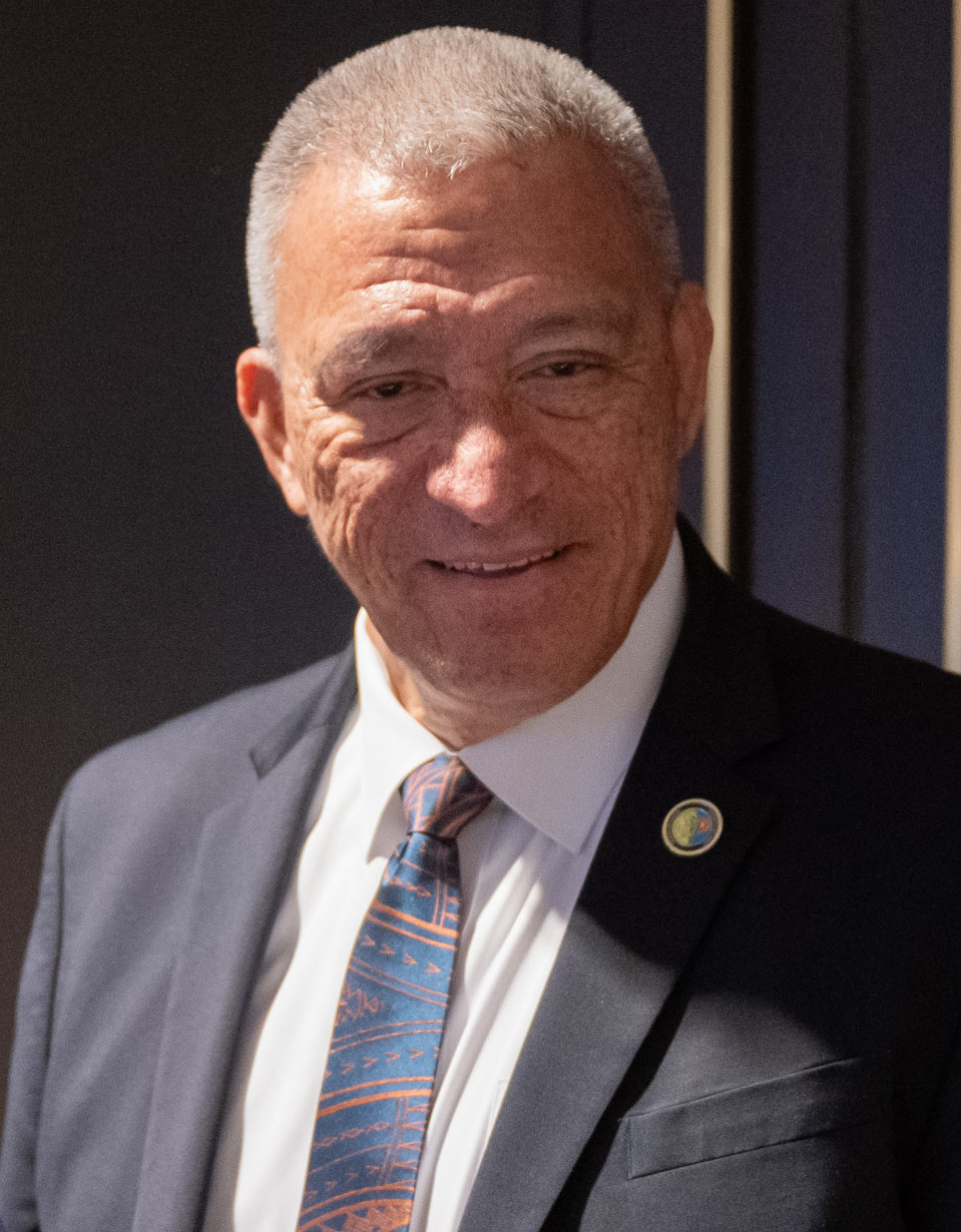
- Incumbent; Richard Bissen since January 3, 2023
- Term length: 4 years, renewable once consecutively
- Constituting instrument: Maui County Charter
- Inaugural holder: Elmer Cravalho
- Formation: January 2, 1969

The Mayor of Maui County is the chief executive officer of the County of Maui in the state of Hawaii. The mayor has municipal jurisdiction over the islands of Kahoolawe, Lanai, Maui and Molokai. The mayor of Maui County is the successor of the Royal Governor of Maui of the Kingdom of Hawaii.

The current mayor of Maui County is former state jurist Richard Bissen. Bissen was elected mayor in 2022, defeating his predecessor Mike Victorino, and re-elected in 2026, defeating Yuki Lei Sugimura. Prominent former mayors include Linda Lingle, the sixth governor of Hawaii and first woman governor, who was mayor from 1991 to 1999.

== List of Maui County mayors ==
Mayor	Term begins	Term ends	Notes
Elmer Cravalho	January 2, 1969	July 24, 1979	First mayor of Maui
Hannibal Tavares	October 1979	January 2, 1991	Tavares won a special election in October 1979 following Cravalho's resignation in July.
Linda Lingle	January 2, 1991	January 2, 1999	6th governor of Hawaii Dec 2, 2002 – Dec 6, 2010
James "Kimo" Apana	January 2, 1999	January 2, 2003	
Alan Arakawa	January 2, 2003	January 2, 2007	
Charmaine Tavares	January 2, 2007	January 2, 2011	
Alan Arakawa	January 2, 2011	January 2, 2019	
Michael Victorino	January 2, 2019	January 3, 2023	
Richard Bissen	January 3, 2023	Present	

== Elections ==
1968 Maui mayoral election
Party	Candidate	Votes	%
Democratic	Elmer Cravalho	11,150	67.68
Republican	G. N. Toshi Enomoto	5,324	32.32
Total votes		16,474	100.00
Democratic win (new seat)			

1970 Maui mayoral election
Party	Candidate	Votes	%
Democratic	Elmer Cravalho (incumbent)	11,901	75.62
Republican	Eddy Nelson	3,836	24.38
Total votes		15,737	100.00
Democratic hold			

1974 Maui mayoral election
Party	Candidate	Votes	%
Democratic	Elmer Cravalho (incumbent)	13,018	69.44
Republican	Paul Elkins	4,921	26.25
People's Party (United States, 1971)	Susanne Sydney	807	4.31
Total votes		18,746	100.00
Democratic hold			

1978 Maui mayoral election
Party	Candidate	Votes	%
Democratic	Elmer Cravalho (incumbent)	Unopposed	100.00
Total votes			100.00
Democratic hold			

1979 Maui mayoral special election (Note: This special election occurred on October 20, 1979 after Elmer Cravalho's resignation on July 24, 1979. The election has no primaries, so all candidates are in one election, and there is no runoff, so a candidate could win with a plurality. However, Hannibal Tavares won with a majority.)
Party	Candidate	Votes	%
Republican	Hannibal Tavares	14,110	51.05
Democratic	Wayne K. Nishiki	5,411	19.58
Democratic	Ronald Y. Kondo	3,120	11.29
Democratic	Abraham Aiona	2,135	7.72
Democratic	Henry Takitani	1,788	6.47
Democratic	Marshall Chris Peterson	219	0.79
Independent	Maria M. Hustace	174	0.63
Independent	Dale M. Johnson	102	0.37
Republican	Paul Elkins	99	0.36
Democratic	Don K. Martin	61	0.22
Independent	Edward P. Kaaloa Jr.	58	0.21
Independent	Peter K. Elaban	53	0.19
Independent	Michael R. Martin	49	0.18
Independent	Jerry B. Walden	33	0.12
Democratic	Samuel Kuualoha Aki	30	0.11
Democratic	Albert F. Rodrigues	27	0.10
Libertarian	Ward L. Schmidt	27	0.09
Independent	Jaj-ji Price	8	0.03
Write-in		135	0.49
Total votes		27,639	
Republican gain from Democratic			

1982 Maui mayoral election
Party	Candidate	Votes	%
Republican	Hannibal Tavares (incumbent)	15,789	55.97
Democratic	Bob Nakasone	12,421	44.03
Total votes		28,210	100.00
Republican hold			

1986 Maui mayoral election
Party	Candidate	Votes	%
Republican	Hannibal Tavares (incumbent)	15,921	53.62
Democratic	Marvin Miura	13,772	46.38
Total votes		29,693	100.00
Republican hold			

1990 Maui mayoral election
Party	Candidate	Votes	%
Republican	Linda Lingle	16,534	48.87
Democratic	Elmer Cravalho	14,243	42.09
Libertarian	Azby Chouteau	2,606	7.70
Independent	Richard Akuna	454	1.34
Total votes		33,837	100.00
Republican gain from Democratic (Note: Hannibal Tavares was elected as a Republican, but switched parties to become a Democrat during his third term.)			

1994 Maui mayoral election
Party	Candidate	Votes	%
Republican	Linda Lingle (incumbent)	18,188	51.42
Democratic	Goro Hokama	15,304	43.26
Natural Law	Frank Furcini	1,433	4.05
Libertarian	Joseph R. Jordan	448	1.27
Total votes		35,373	100.00
Republican hold			

1998 Maui mayoral election
Party	Candidate	Votes	%
Democratic	James Kimo Apana	22,350	52.65
Republican	Alan Arakawa	20,101	47.35
Total votes		42,451	100.00
Democratic gain from Republican			

2002 Maui mayoral election
Party	Candidate	Votes	%
Republican	Alan Arakawa	20,887	51.36
Democratic	James Kimo Apana (incumbent)	19,784	48.64
Total votes		40,671	100.00
Republican gain from Democratic			

2006 Maui mayoral election
Party	Candidate	Votes	%
Democratic	Charmaine Tavares	19,964	52.29
Republican	Alan Arakawa (incumbent)	18,215	47.71
Total votes		38,179	100.00
Democratic gain from Republican			

2010 Maui mayoral election
Party	Candidate	Votes	%
Republican	Alan Arakawa	24,195	58.81
Democratic	Charmaine Tavares (incumbent)	16,944	41.19
Total votes		41,139	100.00
Republican gain from Democratic			

2014 Maui mayoral election
Party	Candidate	Votes	%
Republican	Alan Arakawa (incumbent)	25,435	58.34
Democratic	Tamara "Tam" Paltin	18,162	41.66
Total votes		43,597	100.00
Republican hold			

2018 Maui mayoral election
Party	Candidate	Votes	%
Democratic	Mike Victorino	27,192	55.06
Republican	Elle Cochran	22,190	44.94
Total votes		49,382	100.00
Democratic hold (Note: In 2017, Alan Arakawa switched parties to become a Democrat.)			

2022 Maui mayoral election
Party	Candidate	Votes	%
Republican	Richard Bissen	31,371	61.40
Democratic	Mike Victorino (incumbent)	19,724	38.60
Total votes		51,095	100.00
Republican gain from Democratic			

2026 Maui mayoral election
Party	Candidate	Votes	%
Republican	Richard Bissen (incumbent)		
Democratic	Yuki Lei Sugimura		
Total votes			
Republican hold			
