= Linda Lingle =

Governor of Hawaii from 2002 to 2010

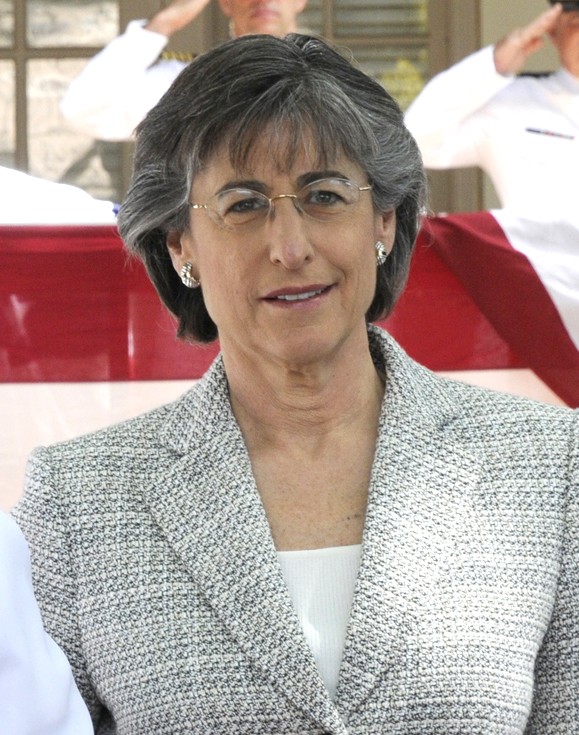
- Lingle in 2010

6th Governor of Hawaii
- In office December 2, 2002 – December 6, 2010
- Lieutenant: Duke Aiona
- Preceded by: Ben Cayetano
- Succeeded by: Neil Abercrombie

Chair of the Hawaii Republican Party
- In office January 2, 1999 – December 2, 2002

3rd Mayor of Maui
- In office January 2, 1991 – January 2, 1999
- Preceded by: Hannibal Tavares
- Succeeded by: Kimo Apana

Personal details
- Born: Linda Cutter; June 4, 1953 (age 73) St. Louis, Missouri, U.S.
- Party: Republican
- Spouses: Charles Lingle (m. 1972; div. 1975); William Crockett (m. 1986; div. 1997)
- Education: California State University, Northridge (BA)

Linda Lingle (née Cutter; born June 4, 1953) is an American politician and publisher who served as the sixth governor of Hawaii from 2002 to 2010. A member of the Republican Party, she was the first Republican elected governor of Hawaii since 1959, and was the state's first female and Jewish governor. Prior to serving as governor, Lingle served as mayor of Maui County from 1991 to 1999 and as chair of the Hawaii Republican Party from 1999 to 2002. As of 2025, Lingle and her lieutenant governor, Duke Aiona, are the last Republicans to have won or held statewide office in Hawaii, and the only living ones who have done so.

During the 2004 Republican National Convention in New York City, Lingle served as chair of the convention during the absence of permanent chair Dennis Hastert from the convention floor. In 2012, she was the Republican nominee for the United States Senate, vying unsuccessfully for an open seat vacated by retiring U.S. Senator Daniel Akaka. She is the only woman to have served as Hawaii's governor.

In January 2015, Lingle was appointed as a senior adviser to Illinois Governor Bruce Rauner, and left the position in July 2016. She also served on the Governors' Council of the Bipartisan Policy Center in Washington, D.C. Lingle moved back to Hawaii in the second quarter of 2017 and became a member of Hawaii Pacific University's board of trustees in June 2017.

== Early life, education, and early career ==
Lingle was born Linda Cutter to a Jewish family in St. Louis, Missouri in 1953, the daughter of Mildred and Richard Cutter. Lingle moved with her parents to Southern California when she was 12. She graduated from Birmingham High School in Lake Balboa, California (at that time, part of Van Nuys), then received her bachelor's degree in journalism cum laude from California State University, Northridge, in 1975.

Soon after that, she followed her father to Hawaii, working first in Honolulu as a public information officer for the Teamsters and Hotel Workers Union. Later, she moved to Molokai, where she started the Molokai Free Press, a community newspaper.

== County politics ==
In 1980, Lingle was elected to the Maui County Council, where she served five two-year terms. Lingle served three of those terms representing Molokai and two terms as an at-large member. Upon the 1990 retirement of Hannibal Tavares as mayor of Maui County, Lingle decided to challenge former Maui mayor and Hawai'i State Speaker of the House of Representatives Elmer Cravalho for the seat. Despite polls showing Lingle trailing far behind her Democratic opponent, Lingle proved victorious. The Honolulu Advertiser and Honolulu Star-Bulletin newspapers declared the election one of the biggest upsets in Hawai'i political history. She had been outspent by $100,000 (with Cravalho's campaign spending $318,212 compared to the $218,291 spent by Lingle's campaign). After winning the election, Lingle became the youngest person elected to the office of Maui County Mayor, at the age of 37, as well as the first woman. She was sworn into office as Mayor of Maui on January 2, 1991. In 1994, Lingle easily won re-election over her Democratic opponent, Maui County councilman Goro Hokama.

Under Lingle's leadership, Maui County implemented performance-based budgeting. Its successful passage and execution earned for Lingle the Distinguished Budget Presentation Award from the Government Finance Officers Association for four years. Mayor Lingle was also credited for attracting tourism and job growth to Maui County during a period when the state tourism industry was struggling.

== 1998 gubernatorial campaign ==
Lingle would once again attempt an upset victory, this time in pursuit of the governor's office in 1998. Barred from seeking a third term as mayor of Maui, Lingle was nominated by the Hawaiʻi Republican Party to run against incumbent governor Benjamin J. Cayetano. Republican party members believed that Lingle was the best shot at the office and that 1998 would probably be the only chance the party would have of ever winning. Lingle capitalized on the anger of Hawaiʻi residents over the stagnant economy and their dissatisfaction with the strategies employed by the Democrats in attempt to solve the problem. Cayetano trailed in the media polls heading into the November election but on the evening of the election, Cayetano and Lingle were separated by a single percentage point forcing a recount. Lingle was defeated in the closest election in Hawaiʻi history.

The state Democratic Party was accused of launching a whisper campaign alleging that Lingle was a lesbian, and that she would abolish Christmas as a state holiday.

== State party chair ==
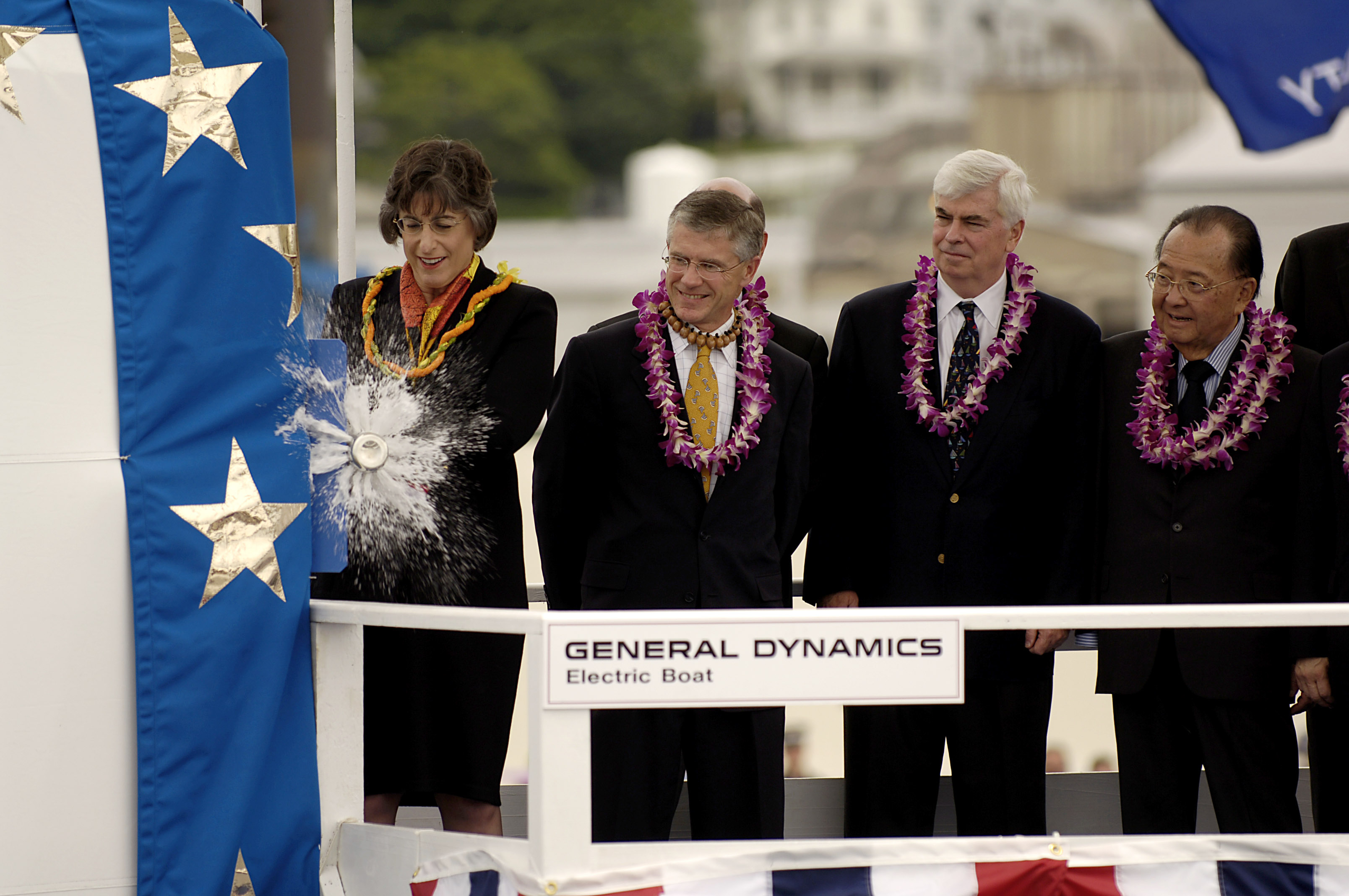
Linda Lingle smashes a bottle of champagne against the sail of the USS Hawaii (SSN-776) during the ship's christening ceremony.

After being defeated, Lingle was elected chair of the Hawaiʻi Republican Party. She served from 1999 to 2002. During her tenure as party chair, Lingle overhauled party policies and gave the party a lift she believed was needed to make the party competitive in a historically Democratic Party-dominated state. Internal reforms proved successful and Lingle succeeded in electing more Republicans to seats in both houses of the Hawaiʻi State Legislature. At the peak of Republican success, the party held 19 of the 51 seats in the state House of Representatives. Party membership grew as younger people joined. Republicans gained a more youthful appearance and had reinvented itself informally as the new GOP Hawaiʻi. Lingle is a member of The Wish List, America's largest fundraising and campaign political action committee for Pro-choice Republican Women and The Republican Majority for Choice.

== Governor of Hawaii ==
=== 2002 gubernatorial campaign ===
Barred from seeking a third term, Cayetano announced his retirement from political service in 2002. Having become even more popular among Hawaii residents, Lingle was once again selected as the Republican nominee for the office of Governor of Hawaii. Her campaign was substantially aided when the popular favorite, Democratic mayor of the City and County of Honolulu Jeremy Harris withdrew after allegations of campaign finance irregularities. Hawaii Democrats then nominated incumbent lieutenant governor Mazie Hirono; it was one of the few gubernatorial races in which both major candidates were women.

Lingle ran on her "Agenda for New Beginnings", a campaign platform developed to promote Republican leadership and highlight their criticisms of the previous 40 years of Democratic administration of the state. It also cited differences between Lingle's message and the previous, more conservative platforms which Hawaii Republicans had advocated.

Focusing less on her mayoral accomplishments and more on the message of reform, Lingle won the election alongside former state judge Duke Aiona, who became Lingle's lieutenant governor.

Lingle was the first state governor-elect not to be inaugurated at the Coronation Pavilion on the grounds of Iolani Palace. She was inaugurated in the rotunda of the Hawaii State Capitol. She took the oath of office upon a Tanakh.

=== First term ===
Lingle signed into law the Three Strikes Law and Sex Offender Registry Website Law. She vetoed a bill that would have required all hospitals in Hawaii to provide emergency contraception to rape victims, concerned that Catholic hospitals would challenge it. In May 2004 Lingle led a delegation to Israel, paid for by the Israeli Government. She enjoyed high approval ratings, usually around 70 percent.

Lingle spent much of 2004 campaigning for Republican candidates, both in the presidential election and the Hawaii state legislature. She supported President George W. Bush's Iraq policies, and campaigned for Bush in the contiguous United States. When some polling late in the election showed Bush tied or narrowly leading Democrat John Kerry, Lingle attempted to help Republicans carry her state for the first time since 1984. Vice President Dick Cheney also campaigned in the state. The state legislature had a Democratic supermajority and she wanted to have enough members to block them from overriding her vetoes. Ultimately, not only did Kerry win the state, but Republicans lost five seats in the state legislature, reducing their presence to near single-digits and causing the Democrats to consider Lingle more vulnerable than they initially expected. The 2004 presidential election in Hawaii was the closest Republicans have come to reclaiming the state since 1984, when Ronald Reagan last won the state.

In January 2006, Lingle received an honorary doctorate degree in public management from the University of the City of Manila, presented by Manila mayor Lito Atienza while Lingle was on an official visit to the Philippines.

In education, she attempted to divide the State Board of Education into seven local school boards, but failed. One of the more controversial issues Lingle championed is the practice of sending prisoners to the mainland, as opposed to building a new prison in Hawaii.

=== 2006 gubernatorial election ===
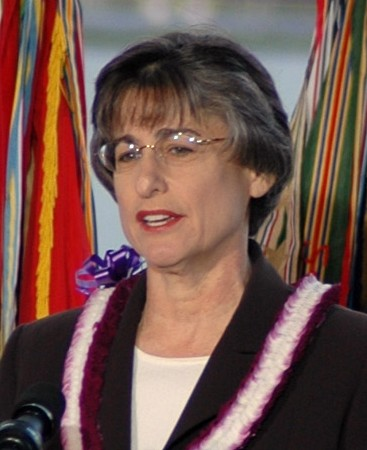
Linda Lingle in December 2006

In 2006, Lingle announced her candidacy for re-election as Governor of Hawaiʻi. In the Democratic Party, many people were speculated to run, but many of them declined, including State Senator Colleen Hanabusa, then Senate President Bobby Bunda, former Congressman Ed Case (who ran for U.S. Senate), U.S. Congressman Neil Abercrombie, and Hawaii County Mayor Harry Kim. Despite the difficulty of finding an opponent for Lingle, former state senator Randy Iwase decided to run for governor. In the primary election he easily defeated Waianae Harbormaster William Aila Jr., and ended up with former Big Island State Senator Malama Solomon as his running mate. Over the course of the campaign, Iwase was considered an underdog who had only spent $340,000, compared to Lingle's $6 million; in his ads, he attacked Lingle over her relationship with President Bush. Governor Lingle won by the largest margin in state history, 63 percent to 35 percent.

=== Second term ===
In August 2007, the Hawaii Supreme Court invalidated a Lingle appointee's exemption of the Hawaii Superferry from having to undertake an environmental assessment before operating in Hawaii waters. The Superferry was an $80 million high-speed ferry. Despite the Court's ruling, the ferry sailed to Kauai without an environmental assessment. It was met by protesters on surfboards who turned the ferry back to Oahu. Lingle summoned a massive police and Coast Guard response. She told Kauai protesters that they would be charged under Hawaii's anti-terrorism laws if they continued to interfere with the Superferry's operation. Lingle sought a legislative exemption from environmental law on behalf of the Superferry (known as Act Two). Several Maui groups, including the Sierra Club, Maui Tomorrow and the Kahului Harbor Coalition challenged the law as unconstitutional, citing a violation of separation of powers, and favoritism towards a single company. The ferry suspended all Hawaii service in March 2009, days after the Hawaii Supreme Court struck down Act Two as unconstitutional.

2008 Republican Convention

As she had four years before, Lingle campaigned for the Republican ticket, describing herself as "of the same breed as McCain and Palin." She received national exposure when she delivered a primetime address on the third night of the 2008 Republican National Convention praising John McCain's choice of Alaska Governor Sarah Palin as his vice-presidential running-mate. Lingle and Palin, both Republican women governors of non-contiguous states, are friends who grew acquainted through the Republican Governors Association. (Palin also attended college at two different institutions in Hawaii in the 1980s, including Hawaii Pacific College, now Hawaii Pacific University, where Lingle took on a trustee position in 2017.) Lingle's speech filled the role of the traditional address formally nominating the vice-presidential candidate, though Palin was not officially nominated until the next night.

Health care policies targeting legal immigrants and Compact of Free Association residents

In July 2009, the Lingle Administration ended the Hawaiʻi Immigrant Health Initiative, a state program providing medical coverage for legal immigrants present in the United States for fewer than five years. This move included the elimination of all residents present in Hawaiʻi under the Compact of Free Association from QUEST, the state's Medicaid coverage plan that assists the low income population in Hawaiʻi with their health care needs. Noting that such a policy likely constituted unlawful discrimination in violation of the Equal Protection Clause, federal district court judge John Michael Seabright issued a preliminary injunction against the implementation of the substituted health care plan. Subsequent Governor Neil Abercrombie indicated that he may continue the State's appeal of the injunction to the United States Court of Appeals for the Ninth Circuit.

School furlough sit-in

On April 13, 2010, two student protesters who were occupying her office were arrested and criminal trespassing citations were issued to eight others. The demonstrators were part of a sit-in to protest a school furlough policy implemented due to budget shortages. The following day, April 14, two more protesters were arrested and citations were issued to five other protesters.

Civil union veto

Lingle on July 6, 2010, vetoed Hawaii House Bill 444, which would have allowed for civil unions for couples in Hawaii, arguing the issue should be decided by referendum. The bill had passed the state house with three votes less than the two-thirds vote threshold necessary to override the veto, although the bill met that threshold in the state senate.

Departure from public office

Ineligible to run for a third term, Governor Lingle was succeeded by Democrat Neil Abercrombie and left office on December 6, 2010. The second Republican governor in state history after William F. Quinn (1959–1962), Lingle remains the only GOP candidate to be re-elected governor of Hawaii by popular vote.

== 2012 U.S. Senate election ==
In October 2011, Lingle said on KSSK radio show that she would run for the open seat vacated by retiring U.S. Senator Daniel Akaka (D-HI). She won the Republican primary election on August 11, 2012, against nominal opposition and faced Hirono in the general election – a repeat of the 2002 gubernatorial race.

Lingle was the first reasonably well-funded Republican to run for the Senate in Hawaii since Pat Saiki ran in the 1990 special election against Akaka, and the strongest Republican candidate for a full term in the Senate from the state in memory. Although a poll in the summer of 2012 showed the race as close as five points, ultimately Hirono defeated Lingle with 63 percent of the vote to Lingle's 37 percent.

== After 2012 ==
After her failed Senate bid, Lingle taught a public policy seminar at California State University, Northridge, from which she had graduated in 1975. She also gave lectures and worked with the Governor's Council and Energy Security Council for the Bipartisan Policy Center.

In January 2015, Lingle was appointed as a senior adviser to Illinois governor Bruce Rauner. She was to join a trio of outsiders in May/June 2015 to work on problems such as the state's retirement system and low credit ratings. Lingle left the chief operating officer position in July 2016. Weeks later, she delivered an opening-day speech at the 2016 Republican National Convention about Jewish support for the party and for Donald Trump as its presidential nominee.

In January 2017, Lingle announced at a Republican gathering that she planned to move back to Hawaii in April 2017. In May 2017, she was one of four former governors brought together by Harvard University to discuss issues related to the nation's opioid crisis. Lingle became a member of Hawaii Pacific University's board of trustees in June 2017 and served through 2020.

In December 2018, Lingle was the last speaker in a year-long Leadership Series for the Nisei Veterans Memorial Center. In her comments, Lingle described her leadership path and said that people aren't born leaders, but become them through handling failures and taking advantage of opportunities for success when others do not.

Lingle supported 2020 candidate Rick Blangiardi, who won election to become mayor of Honolulu in January 2021.

In 2022, Lingle led a new "Women's Prison Project" seeking to reform women's processing through Hawaii's criminal justice system; in 2023, the project helped open housing for women leaving prison. Also in 2022, Lingle and others established a Hawaii Pacific University scholarship in her name for students showing a potential for exceptional leadership.

== Personal life ==
Lingle was married and divorced twice. She married her first husband, Charles Lingle, while in college, in 1972. Upon leaving California for Hawaii, she divorced him in 1975 but kept the Lingle name. During her term as mayor of Maui County, Lingle divorced her second husband, Maui attorney William Crockett, to whom she was married from 1986 to 1997. Lingle is currently single and does not have any children.

Her uncle founded the Cutter Ford car dealerships in Hawaiʻi.

Lingle is a California State University, Northridge 2004 distinguished alumni honoree.

Lingle is active in the Republican Jewish Coalition, serving as a speaker at events and otherwise using her role as the only Jewish Republican US governor. President George W. Bush appointed her to serve on the Honorary Delegation to accompany him to Jerusalem for the celebration of the 60th anniversary of the State of Israel in May 2008.

== Electoral history ==
1990 Maui mayoral election
Party	Candidate	Votes	%
Republican	Linda Lingle	16,534	48.87
Democratic	Elmer Cravalho	14,243	42.09
Libertarian	Azby Chouteau	2,606	7.70
Independent	Richard Akuna	454	1.34
Total votes		33,837	100.00
Republican gain from Democratic (Note: Hannibal Tavares was elected as a Republican, but switched parties to become a Democrat during his third term.)			

1994 Maui mayoral election
Party	Candidate	Votes	%
Republican	Linda Lingle (incumbent)	18,188	51.42
Democratic	Goro Hokama	15,304	43.26
Natural Law	Frank Furcini	1,433	4.05
Libertarian	Joseph R. Jordan	448	1.27
Total votes		35,373	100.00
Republican hold			

1998 Hawaii gubernatorial election
Party	Candidate	Votes	%
Democratic	Ben Cayetano (incumbent)	204,206	50.11
Republican	Linda Lingle	198,952	48.82
Libertarian	George Peabody	4,398	1.08
Total votes		407,556	100.00
Democratic hold			

2002 Hawaii gubernatorial election
Party	Candidate	Votes	%
Republican	Linda Lingle	194,338	52.31
Democratic	Mazie Hirono	177,186	47.69
Total votes		371,524	100.00
Republican gain from Democratic			

2006 Hawaii gubernatorial election
Party	Candidate	Votes	%
Republican	Linda Lingle (incumbent)	215,313	63.89
Democratic	Randy Iwase	121,717	36.11
Total votes		337,030	100.00
Republican hold			

2012 United States Senate election in Hawaii
Party	Candidate	Votes	%	±%
Democratic	Mazie Hirono	269,489	62.60%	+1.25%
Republican	Linda Lingle	160,994	37.40%	+0.62%
Total votes		430,483	100.00%	N/A
Democratic hold				

== See also ==
- List of female governors in the United States
- Washington Place

== Notes ==
Political offices
Preceded by Hannibal Tavares	Mayor of Maui; 1991–1999	Succeeded by Kimo Apana
Preceded by Ben Cayetano	Governor of Hawaii; 2002–2010	Succeeded by Neil Abercrombie
Party political offices
Preceded by Pat Saiki	Republican nominee for Governor of Hawaii; 1998, 2002, 2006	Succeeded by Duke Aiona
Preceded by Cynthia Thielen	Republican nominee for U.S. Senator from Hawaii (Class 1); 2012	Succeeded by Ron Curtis
U.S. order of precedence (ceremonial)
Preceded by Ben Cayetano as Former Governor	Order of precedence of the United States	Succeeded by Neil Abercrombie as Former Governor
