= Hannibal Tavares =

American politician (1919–1998)

2nd Mayor of Maui
- In office October 1979 – January 2, 1991
- Preceded by: Elmer F. Cravalho
- Succeeded by: Linda Lingle

Personal details
- Born: September 24, 1919 Makawao, Territory of Hawaii, U.S.
- Died: January 17, 1998 (aged 78) Wailuku, Hawaii, U.S.
- Spouse: Harriet Tavares

Hannibal M. Tavares (September 24, 1919 – January 17, 1998) was an American politician who served as the 2nd Mayor of Maui from October 1979 until January 2, 1991. He was the longest-serving mayor of Maui.

== Life ==
Tavares was born in Makawao, Maui, Hawaii, on September 24, 1919.

In 1978, Maui Mayor Elmer Cravalho won reelection to a second term, but he suddenly left office only months later. The vacancy left by Cravalho's resignation necessitated a special mayoral election. In October 1979, Hannibal Tavares won the special mayoral election to complete the remainder of Cravalho's term.

Tavares went on to win reelection and became Maui's longest-serving mayor to date. He retired from office on January 2, 1991, and was succeeded by Republican Linda Lingle.

Tavares's daughter, Charmaine Tavares, served as mayor of Maui from January 2, 2007, to January 2, 2011. Both are the descendants of Portuguese immigrants who settled in Hawaii.

He died at Maui Memorial Hospital in Wailuku, Hawaii, on January 17, 1998, at the age of 78. A resident of Kula, Maui, Tavares was survived by his wife, Harriet Y.T; three children, Charmaine Tavares, Sharon Klaschka, and Gary Tavares; three sisters, Helen Medeiros, Margaret Roberts and Sophie Stone; five grandchildren and two great-grandchildren.
