= Chaka Seisay =

American rapper

Chak La Rock
- Also known as: Complicated C, DJ Chaka
- Born: Chaka Seisay; New Rochelle, New York, U.S.A.
- Genres: Hip hop; rock music; soul; electronic
- Occupations: Rapper; musician; singer-songwriter; DJ; producer
- Instruments: Vocals; percussion; keyboard; guitar
- Years active: 1987 – present
- Website: frankernest.com

Chaka Seisay known professionally as Chak La Rock is an American rapper, singer, songwriter, producer and DJ. He is the lead singer and founding member of urban soul rock music collective 'Frank Ernest'. He is one of Sweden's first professional hip hop artists.

== Career ==
=== 1987-1989 ===
During the late 1980s and early 1990s, he formed the Stockholm based hip hop duo Sure Shot Groove with MC Stranger.

Sure Shot Groove was recorded at Swemix, a place where young musicians could hone their skills. These musicians would go on, to the Swedish music scene in the 1990s and bring American-style hip hop into the mainstream of Swedish music.

In 1989, Sure Shot Groove release the single We'll Never Fess and the 12 inch single Rhymes Are Flowing.

=== 1990s ===
In 1992, he appeared regularly on 'Clubhopping' a dance/hip hop music program on Swedish television network ZTV hosted by Rob'n'Raz.

In 1993, he appeared in the Daniel Fridell film 'Sökarna'.

He became a sought-after DJ in the mid-1990s organizing popular hip hop/soul and r&b clubs in Stockholm and rapidly scoring gigs around Europe.

=== 2000s ===
In 2000, he co-wrote and performed backing vocals on the singel 'Friday Night Is Here' by D-Flex.

In 2008, he began a songwriting project with songwriter and bass player Nebosja 'Neb Malicious' Grujic, drummer Clemons 'C1' Mårtensson with contributions from rapper/guitarist Oliver 'Diplomatic' Hallqvist. They formed the band One. In 2009, 'The Fact Remains' the single he co-wrote and performed with One, was selected for the compilation album Groove.

In 2015, he founded urban soul rock collective Frank Ernest with Malicious. They teamed up with lead guitarist Stefan 'Grooveya' Grujic and drummer Clemons 'C1' Mårtensson began a new music project.

On September 30, 2016 Frank Ernest released their debut album 'One Time for the Mind' and the title track 'Revolution of the Mind' on iTunes and Spotify.

== Discography ==
LPs

- Way Out (2010) by One
- One Time For The Mind (2016) by Frank Ernest

Singles

- We'll Never Fess (1989) by Sure Shot Groove
- Rhymes Are Flowin (1989) by Sure Shot Groove
- Friday Night Is Here (2009) by Dflex
- The Fact Remains (2009) by One
- Are You Ready (2010) by One
- Rings And Things (2010) by One
- Revolution of the Mind (2016) by Frank Ernest

== Websites ==
Chaka Seisay @ IMDb

Frank Ernest - Official website.

Frank Ernest on iTunes

Frank Ernest on Spotify

Frank Ernest Instagram

Frank Ernest Twitter

Frank Ernest Facebook Fanpage
