= Steve Sue =

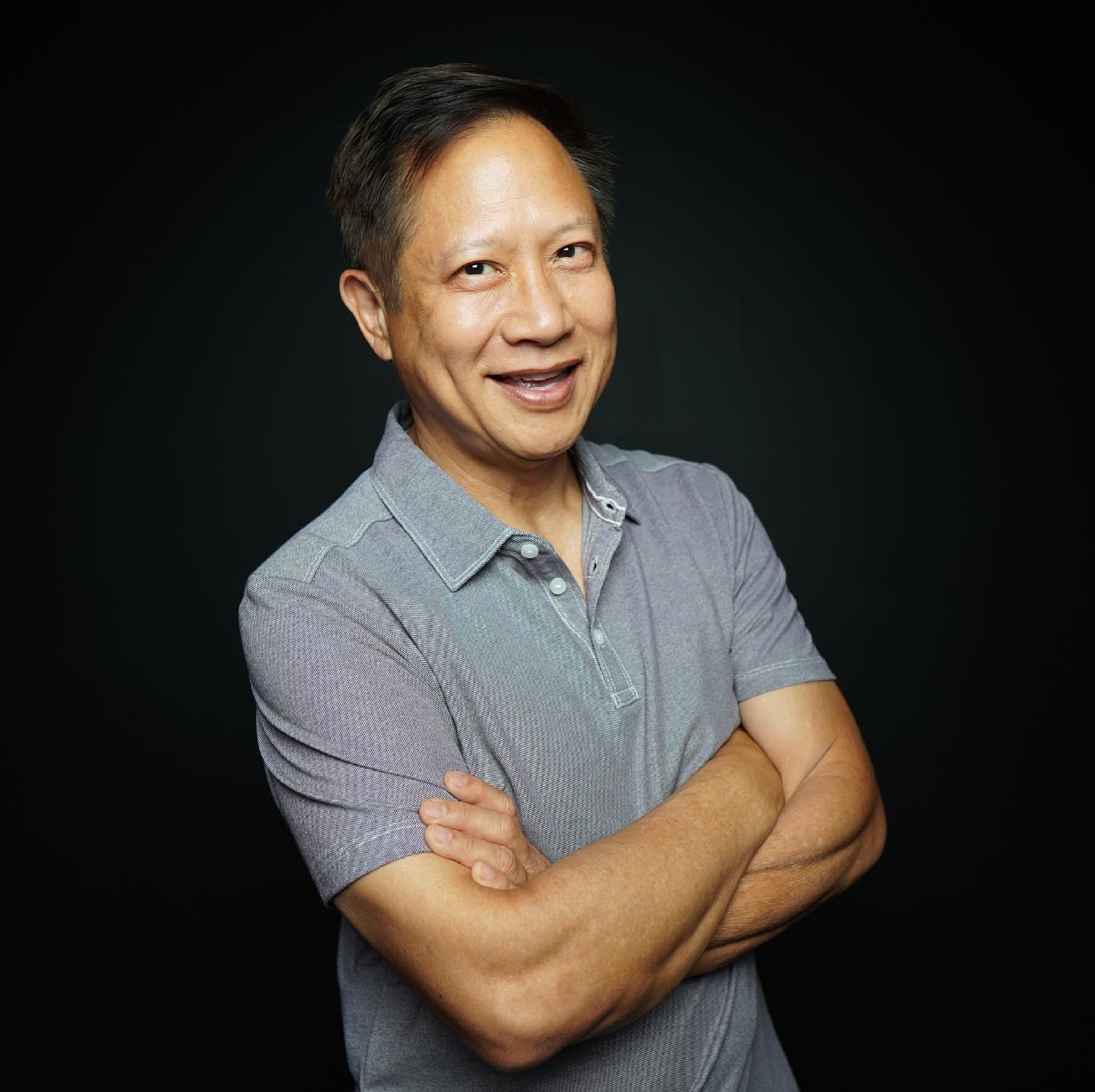
- Born: Oakland, California, United States
- Education: BA Design UCLA, JD UC Berkeley School of Law
- Occupations: Software developer Filmmaker; Nonprofit operator
- Organizations: ID8 501C3; O-WOW, Inc.
- Known for: Shaka: A Story of Aloha; Project-based learning programs Documentary Filmmaking
- Notable work: "Shaka, A Story of Aloha"; Project Shaka; Shaka Law of Hawai'i; Shaka HI DMV Plates; Lemonade Alley; Project Lemon Tree; Impressions; BizGym.com; SumoSum.com
- Awards: "Shaka, A Story of Aloha" (2024) Audience Award Best Documentary, Hawaii International Film Festival, Bedrock Development, Inc. - Sixth fastest-growing company in the San Francisco Bay Area by SF Business Times (1994); Entrepreneur of the Year, BBB Hawaii Torch awards show (2013); Lemonade Alley and BizGym Foundations - Public Charity award from the BBB Hawaii Torch awards show (2014)
- Website: stevesue.com

Steve Sue is an American software developer, filmmaker, and nonprofit operator. He is producer and writer of the documentary film Shaka: A Story of Aloha. The film won the Audience Award for Documentary Feature at the 2024 Hawaiʻi International Film Festival.The film won the Audience Award for Documentary Feature at the 2024 Hawaiʻi International Film Festival. He also created Project Shaka, a nonprofit initiative associated with the film.

As part of Project Shaka, he wrote a bill that Hawai'i Governor Josh Green signed into law on June 21, 2024, making the shaka the Official State Gesture of Hawai'i. It has been described as the first state gesture in the United States. Also in 2024, he created the Official Hawai'i DMV Shaka License Plate program to promote road safety in Hawai'i. Both the Shaka documentary and Project Shaka are part of ID8, a Hawai'i 501C3 nonprofit founded by Sue where he serves as chairperson.

Sue is the owner of O-WOW, Inc., a branding and digital automation firm that develops custom software, app and website solutions, including SumoSum.com, a financial forecasting application. Sue’s career includes work as a story consultant and conceptual designer in entertainment, hospitality, food service, retail, product and software. He holds a BA in design from UCLA and a JD in law from UC Berkeley.

He has developed project-based learning educational and entrepreneurship programs including Lemonade Alley, Project Lemon Tree and BizGym.com. Sue donated use of BizGym to schools including Iolani School in Honolulu, Hawaii, where he launched Lemonade Alley, an eco-entrepreneur challenge. At Lemonade Alley, students grades K–12 invent recipes, build stands from recycled materials and sell lemonade for a day to raise money for a charity or school of their choice. Project Lemon Tree is a school tree planting program that includes curriculum to guide the design and building of citrus pergola projects. He has written project-based learning curriculum models including entrepreneurship, app development and SEO writing, available at Amazon.

Sue started his career as a home builder, founding Bedrock Development, Inc. in Oakland, California. Bedrock evolved into an environmental design firm with architecture, theme and branding units that created production housing, retail, restaurants, live entertainment sets and theme parks. He worked as a conceptual designer on various projects including mega-resort developments in and through Las Vegas.

Sue's hand-drawing style was licensed by AutoDesk, maker of AutoCAD, to create Impressions software to turn technical "DWG" drawings to a hand-rendered style. Through AutoDesk, Sue learned software development. He then created BizGym.com, an entrepreneur's growth system that combines business planning, financial forecasting and brand story development into one package.

Sue and his organizations have received multiple awards and recognitions. Bedrock Development, Inc. was named the sixth fastest-growing company in the San Francisco Bay Area by the SF Business Times, and Bizgenics Foundation, Lemonade Alley and Sue have won awards from several Hawaii-based associations including BBB Hawaii.

== Career ==
Sue's career began as a home building contractor under the tutelage of his father John Sue. As his business grew he worked in design, brand development and business planning. He credits mentorships under casino designer Bill Bardsley and Las Vegas architect Paul Steelman. He worked on a variety of building projects including theme parks, restaurants, retail, large corporate events, show set designs and other projects in the Los Angeles and San Francisco areas. He was hired by Autodesk to create a software program called Impressions which converts AutoCAD drawings into a hand-drawing style. Sue went on to make software called BizGym.com under StoryManager, Inc. (later renamed O-WOW, Inc.). In 2012, he created a partnership between BizGym.com and the Hong Kong-based business CyberPort to create a Chinese language online entrepreneur toolset. User behavior in BizGym showed high use of a visual financial forecasting toolset Sue had created, thus a separate title called SumoSum.com was launched to directly serve forecasting users. Through his nonprofit, ID8, Sue operated a film and TV studio for the State of Hawai'i called ID8 Studios from 2020 to 2023. Sue is currently a mentor at a number of Hawaii-based entrepreneurial associations including the accelerator Blue Startups.

In 2011, Sue largely retired to found a nonprofit that featured a culinary entrepreneurship challenge for K-12 students called Lemonade Alley. According to Sue, he created the challenge to help children develop life skills. Lemonade Alley got its start due to the BizGym website being used in schools such as ʻIolani School. This drew the interest of Capital One Bank, which gave a $60,000 grant to make Lemonade Alley a permanent event. He then created BizGym Foundation, a nonprofit organization (later renamed ID8) in order to receive grant money. The inaugural event hosted 30 student teams of 5 students to create lemonade stands for the day and sell for the charity of their choice. Charities included the Ronald McDonald House of Hawaii, St. Jude Children's Research Hospital, Make a Wish Hawaii and more. In 2014, the organization raised more than $15,000 for local Hawaiian charities. In 2020, Lemonade Alley was shuttered due the COVID Pandemic then converted into in-school curriculum for teachers and schools to run on their own.

== Recognition ==
In its sixth year of operation, Sue's home building business Bedrock Development, Inc. was named the sixth fastest-growing company in the San Francisco Bay Area by the San Francisco Business Times, part of American City Business Journals. At the 2014 BBB Hawaii Torch awards show in Honolulu, Sue was awarded the BBB Hawaii's Public Charity award for his work on the Lemonade Alley event as well as his work on BizGym Foundation. The Lemonade Alley event was praised by blogger Chelsea Seki, who found both the event and its cause to be admirable. A. Kam Napier (an editor for Pacific Business News) compared Lemonade Alley to the television shows "Shark Tank" and "The Apprentice" (both TV shows about people being judged for their business acumen by celebrities and business people), except with kids being the participants. Two brothers who participated in a Lemonade Alley event won an award for the lemonade that they made from the Hyatt Regency Waikiki Beach Resort and Spa. Their lemonade was then later sold at the resort, with a portion of the sales going to the Kapiolani Medical Center for Women and Children. Midweek Oahu covered BizGym Foundation and Lemonade Alley on its cover story, "The Power of Lemonade". Midweek staff listed Lemonade Alley among West Oahu highlights. BizGym Foundation was one of three finalists (alongside Business Law Corps and the United Cerebral Palsy Association) at a Nonprofit Business Plan Competition held by the Hogan Entrepreneurs program and the American Savings Bank. BizGym Foundation and the other two finalists were awarded a total of $1,000 each.
