= Shaka: A Story of Aloha =

2024 documentary film

- Theatrical release poster
- Directed by: Alexander Bocchieri
- Written by: Steve Sue
- Produced by: Steve Sue
- Starring: Steve Sue; Kekela Miller; Brook Mahealani Lee; Kenneth S. Hara; Frank De Lima; Fred Hemmings; Henry Kapono; Moana Jones Wong; Peter Townend; Ian Cairns
- Production company: ID8
- Release date: May 2, 2024 (VC Film Fest)
- Running time: 80 minutes
- Country: United States
- Language: English

Shaka: A Story of Aloha is a 2024 American documentary film directed by Alexander Bocchieri and produced/written by Steve Sue. The film explores the origins and meanings of the shaka gesture and traces its contemporary use in Hawaiʻi and beyond.

== Synopsis ==
Shaka, A Story of Aloha follows filmmaker Steve Sue as he investigates the history and meanings of Hawaiʻi’s shaka hand gesture. Framed as an inquiry that utilizes interviews, archival material, and a “crime board” of pictures and clippings, the film opens at “ShakaCon” 2022 at the Polynesian Cultural Center in Lāʻie, where a public shaka contest raises questions about what the gesture signifies and how it originated.

The documentary surveys examples of the shaka’s public use in Hawaiʻi and beyond, touching on popular culture, broadcast media, sport, and politics. It then presents several competing origin accounts—including Buddhist associations with Shakyamuni and various local explanations—before concentrating on an account centered on Hamana Kalili of Lāʻie, a Kahuku Sugar Mill worker who lost three fingers and later served as a train guard. Interviewees describe youths mimicking his hand as a lookout signal, which the film identifies as an early form of the shaka.

The narrative returns to the contest to compare different “styles” of the gesture and closes by emphasizing themes of welcome, reconciliation, and “aloha,” while acknowledging that the precise origin remains debated.

== Production ==
Originally conceived in 2019 as a short classroom video, the project expanded due to public interest. After delays during the COVID-19 pandemic, filming resumed in 2022 with footage from ShakaCon, a shaka contest held at the Polynesian Cultural Center and a revival of the hukilau in Lāʻie.

Produced by the Hawaiʻi-based nonprofit ID8, executive produced by Steve Sue and Bryan Spicer, the film features an original soundtrack directed by Grammy-nominated artist Henry Kapono. Cultural advisors included Robert “Lono” Ikuwa, Manu Boyd, and Hailama Farden.

== Release ==
The world premiere took place at the Visual Communications (LA Asian Pacific) Film Festival in Los Angeles on May 2, 2024. It later screened at the Hawaiʻi International Film Festival in October–November 2024.

The film began streaming on Apple TV, Amazon Prime Video and Fandango at Home from 16 January 2026.

== Reception ==
At the 44th Hawaiʻi International Film Festival, Shaka: A Story of Aloha won the Audience Award for Documentary Feature. Local coverage also reported strong audience response during the festival.

== See also ==
- Shaka sign
- Hawaiʻi State Shaka Gesture – the 2024 law designating the shaka as the state gesture
