= James Apana =

American politician

James "Kimo" Apana

4th Mayor of Maui
- In office January 2, 1999 – January 2, 2003
- Preceded by: Linda Lingle
- Succeeded by: Alan Arakawa

Personal details
- Born: Wailuku, Hawaii
- Party: Democratic
- Education: University of Hawaiʻi at Mānoa

James K. Apana, popularly known as Kimo Apana, served as Mayor of the County of Maui in Hawaii from 1999 to January 2, 2003. Born in Wailuku, he graduated from Kamehameha Schools and obtained a speech degree at the University of Hawaiʻi at Mānoa. Upon ending his studies, Apana was hired by the Hawai'i State Legislature to be its budget analyst while at the same time, he managed a family business. In 1993, Apana won his first of three terms to the Maui County Council representing his hometown of Wailuku. In 1998, Apana was elected mayor as a Democrat to succeed then-gubernatorial candidate Mayor Linda Lingle.
