= Shaka sign =

Hand gesture

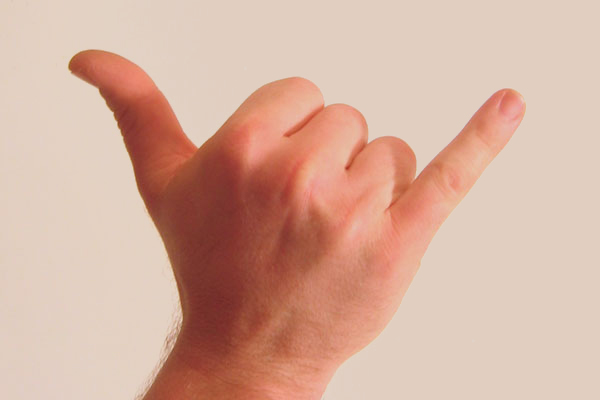
The "shaka" sign

The shaka sign, sometimes known as "hang loose" or "hang ten", is a gesture representing "aloha spirit, love and local pride" that is the official hand gesture of Hawaii and is also associated with global surf culture. It consists of extending the thumb and smallest finger while holding the three middle fingers curled, and gesturing in salutation while presenting the front or back of the hand; the wrist may be rotated back and forth for emphasis. The shaka sign is similar in shape to the letter Y in the American manual alphabet in American Sign Language or the sign for number six in the Chinese hand counting system. The shaka sign should not be confused with the sign of the horns, where the index and pinky fingers are extended and the thumb holds down the middle two fingers.

== Origins ==
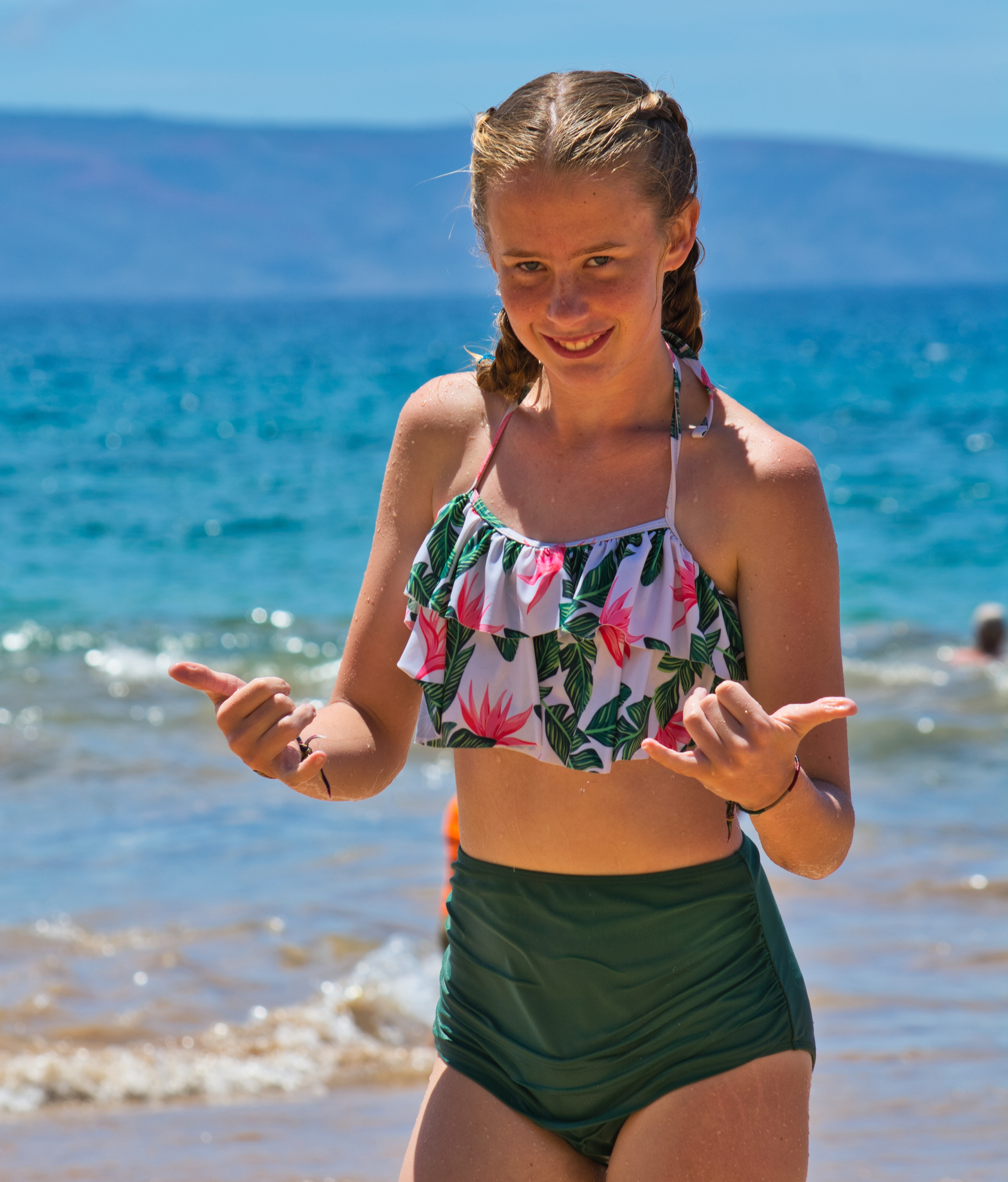
Young girl giving the double shaka sign

According to the Honolulu Star-Bulletin, prevailing local lore credits the gesture to Hamana Kalili of Laie, who lost the three middle fingers of his right hand while working at the Kahuku Sugar Mill. Kalili was then shifted to guarding the sugar train, and his all-clear wave of thumb and pinkie is said to have evolved into the shaka as children imitated the gesture.

Another theory relates the origin of the shaka to the Spanish immigrants, who folded their middle fingers and took their thumbs to their lips as a friendly gesture to represent sharing a drink with the natives they met in Hawaii.

The late Lippy Espinda, a used car salesman and Oahu-based entertainer, has also been named as a possible creator of the shaka. Espinda, who frequently appeared as an extra in Hawaii Five-O as well as The Brady Bunch episodes shot in Hawaii, used the term and the sign during his television ads in the '60s. Though the claim that he is the originator of the shaka sign is debatable, he is credited with increasing its popularity and that of Hawaiian Pidgin as well.

The word shaka is also used as an interjection expressing approval, which may predate its use for the shaka sign. According to the Oxford English Dictionary the origin of the word is uncertain, but it may come from Japanese, where it is a byname for the Buddha.

== Meaning and use ==
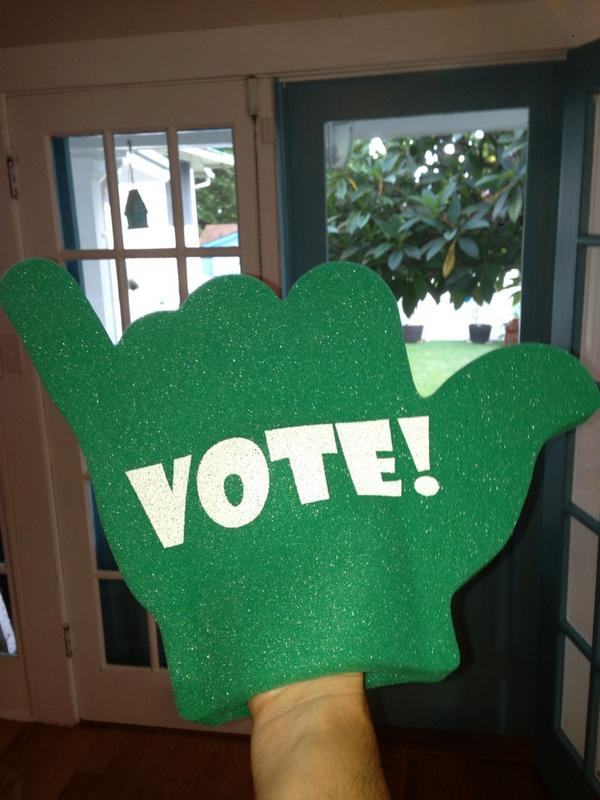
A shaka sign foam finger used in Brian Schatz's 2014 Hawaii senatorial campaign

Residents of Hawaii use the shaka to convey the "Aloha Spirit", a concept of friendship, understanding, compassion, and solidarity among the various ethnic cultures that reside in Hawaii, lacking a direct semantic to literal translation. Drivers will often use it on the road to communicate greetings along with gratitude.

In 2024, Hawaii enacted Act 85 designating the shaka as the state's official gesture; the law describes the form of the gesture and is codified as HRS §5-23.

In the Honolulu public transport system (TheBus and Skyline), HOLO card readers display the shaka sign (along with a ukulele tone) when a card is tapped. Drivers who let TheBus merge or otherwise drive easily can be greeted with a Shaka, activated by a switch in the driver's console. The design of TheBus's shaka is based on a shaka thrown by President Barack Obama at the 2012 Asian Pacific American Institute for Congressional Studies Gala.

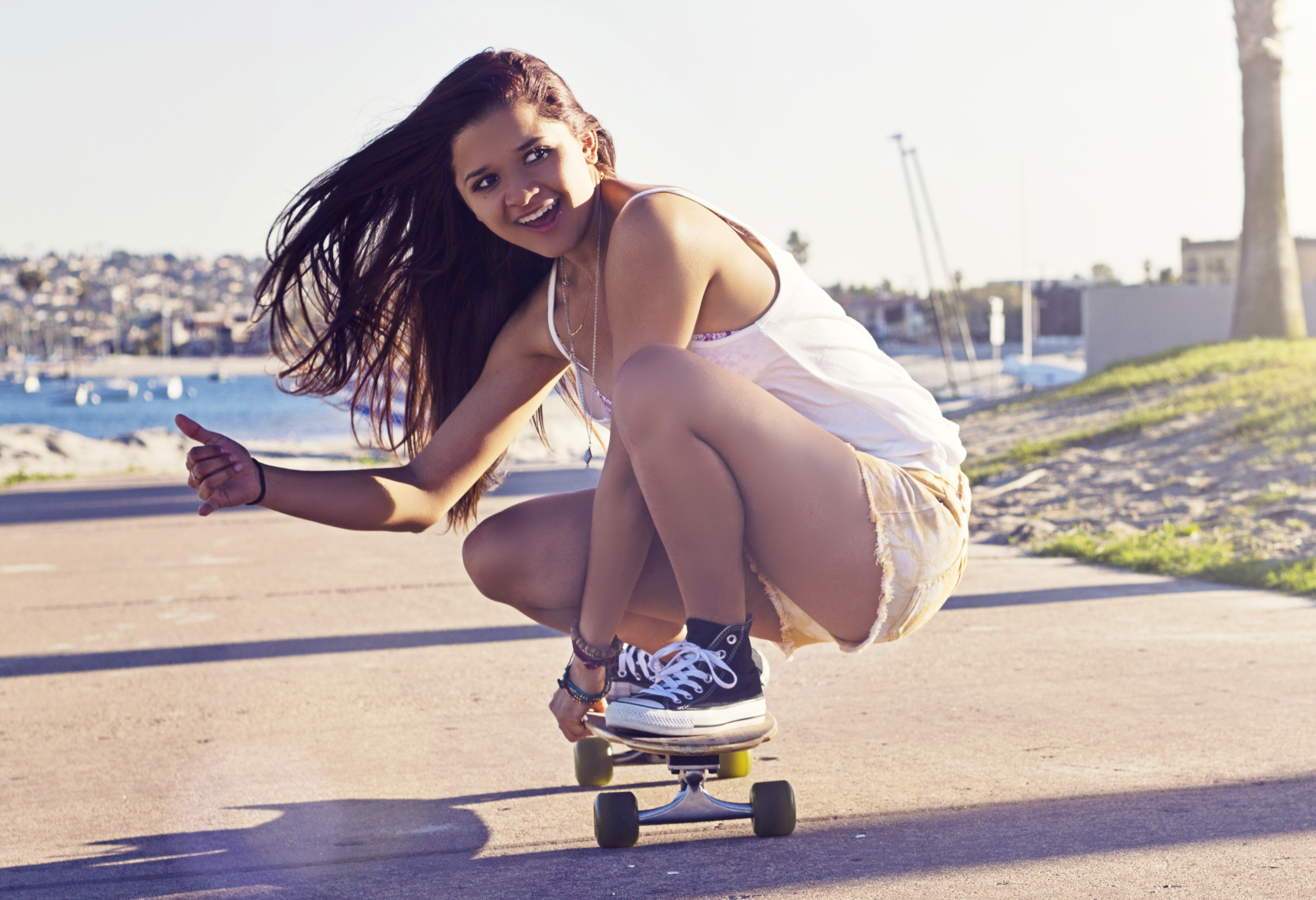
A skateboarder displaying the shaka sign while riding her longboard

In Hawaii, the shaka sign is known as "hang loose" and is popular in surfer culture.

Australian men's mental health charity The Shaka Project uses the shaka sign in its merchandise and logo.

There are several emoticon representations of the shaka sign, including \,,,/, \m/, and \,,,_. The earliest known use of the first two, with three commas or a lower case "m" corresponding to a hand's three middle fingers, is from 2006. The last, similar to the first except that it represents the thumb extended horizontally (as if perpendicular to the wrist) is reported, together with the first form, from Brigham Young University in 2016.

== Shaka license plate ==
In May 2024, the Hawaii Department of Motor Vehicles (DMV) introduced a specialty license plate featuring the shaka gesture as part of the state’s Nonprofit License Plate Program. A portion of the proceeds from the annual registration fee supports ID8, a Hawaii-based 501(c)(3) nonprofit organization that promotes ideas and creative expressions with positive social impact. According to Steve Sue, chairperson of ID8, the program is intended to "reduce road rage and increase aloha spirit".

== Similar gestures ==
=== Chinese number gestures ===
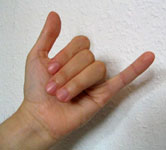
Chinese "six" gesture

The sign has some similarities to the Chinese number gesture for "six".

=== Beverages ===
The sign can also be used to indicate the imbibing of a bottled drink, either alcoholic or non-alcoholic, as attested to below, by placing the thumb to the mouth and motioning the little finger upward as if tipping up a bottle's bottom end. A similar meaning can be achieved by pressing the thumb up against the tip of the nose with the little finger raised upwards parallel to the bridge of the nose. It is referred to as "schooies" in Australia (Australian slang for a schooner)

=== Telecommunications ===
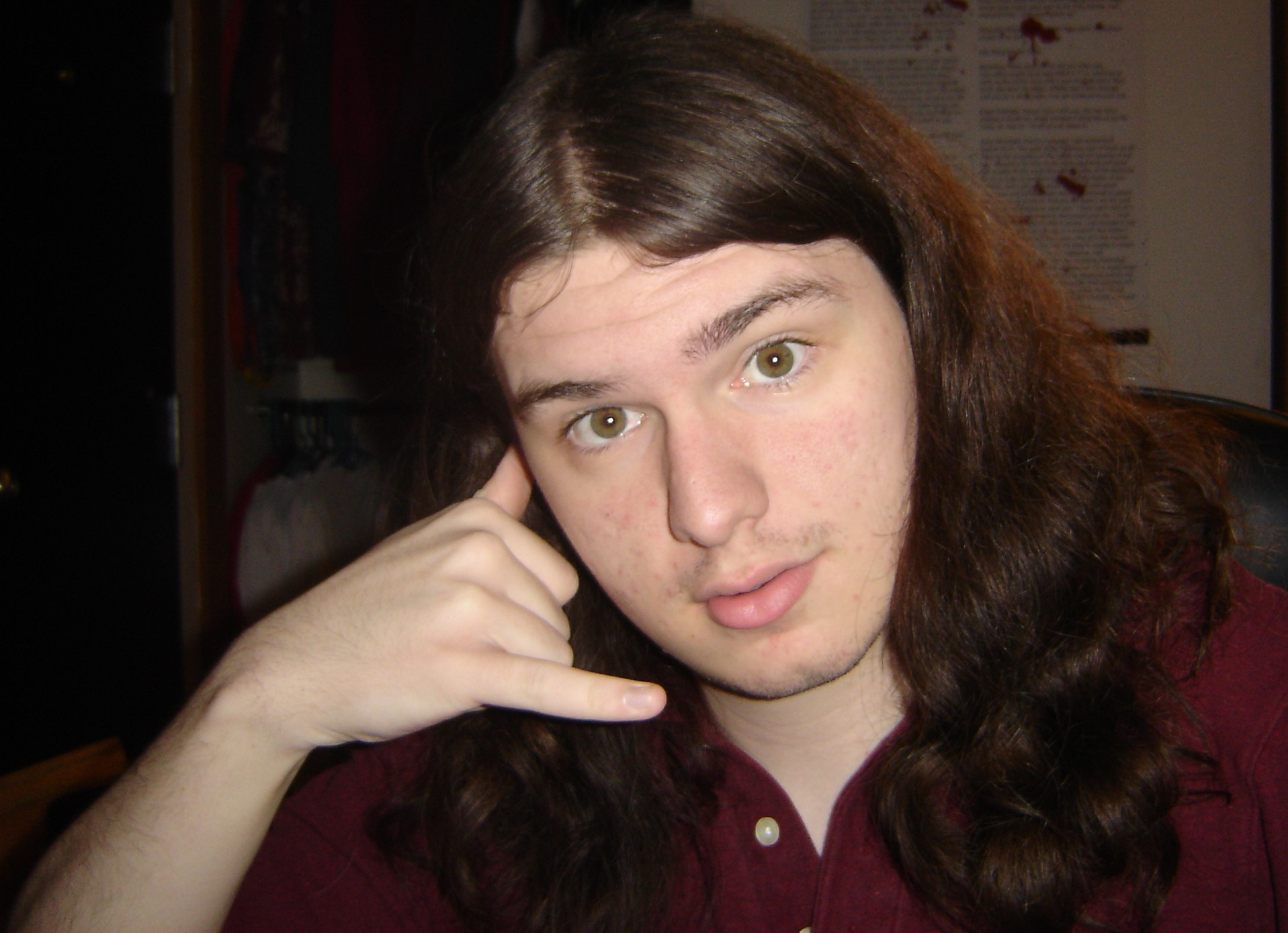
"Call me" gesture

With the thumb held near the ear and the little finger pointed at the mouth, the gesture is commonly understood to mimic the handset of a traditional landline telephone, and depending on context can be understood to stand for "call me", "I'll call you", or "let's talk on the phone".

The Unicode 9.0 emoji 🤙 "Call me hand" can be interpreted as the shaka sign.

American tennis player Ben Shelton is known for commemorating his victories with this hand gesture.

=== New Zealand ===
In New Zealand, the shaka sign is a gang salute for the Mongrel Mob, but is not commonly used for this purpose. It can also serve as a greeting, meaning "Chur", which is a friendly gesture between friends, similar to in Hawaii where it is used in the same context.

=== Austrian Leiwand ===
A similar gesture was common among criminals in Vienna in 1935, accompanying the word of approval or appreciation "Leiwand".

== Usage examples ==
Since 2015, fans of Brigham Young University (which has a satellite campus in Hawaii and is also known colloquially as "the Y") have started using the gesture, in deference to newly hired Kalani Sitake, BYU's Polynesian head football coach, and because of its similarity with the letter Y in the American manual alphabet in American Sign Language. It is also used as a nod of respect to Hamana Kalili, a native Hawaiian Latter-day Saint who, according to locals, is the founder of the popular sign.

In 2024, Filipino P-pop girl group BINI became associated with the gesture when group member Sheena used it with the distinctive phrase, "Eyyy ka muna, eyyy".

The gesture was also used by Brazilian soccer player Edmundo during his goal celebrations. Later, it was adopted by Brazilian soccer player, Ronaldinho Gaúcho, who would celebrate his goals by flashing a double "hang loose" sign toward the heavens, that made it known in Brazil as the "sinal do Ronaldinho"'(Ronaldinho's gesture). In the following decade, Brazilian soccer player Luciano used the gesture, signaling a double "hang loose" to the fans—with the match ball tucked under one arm—whenever he scored.

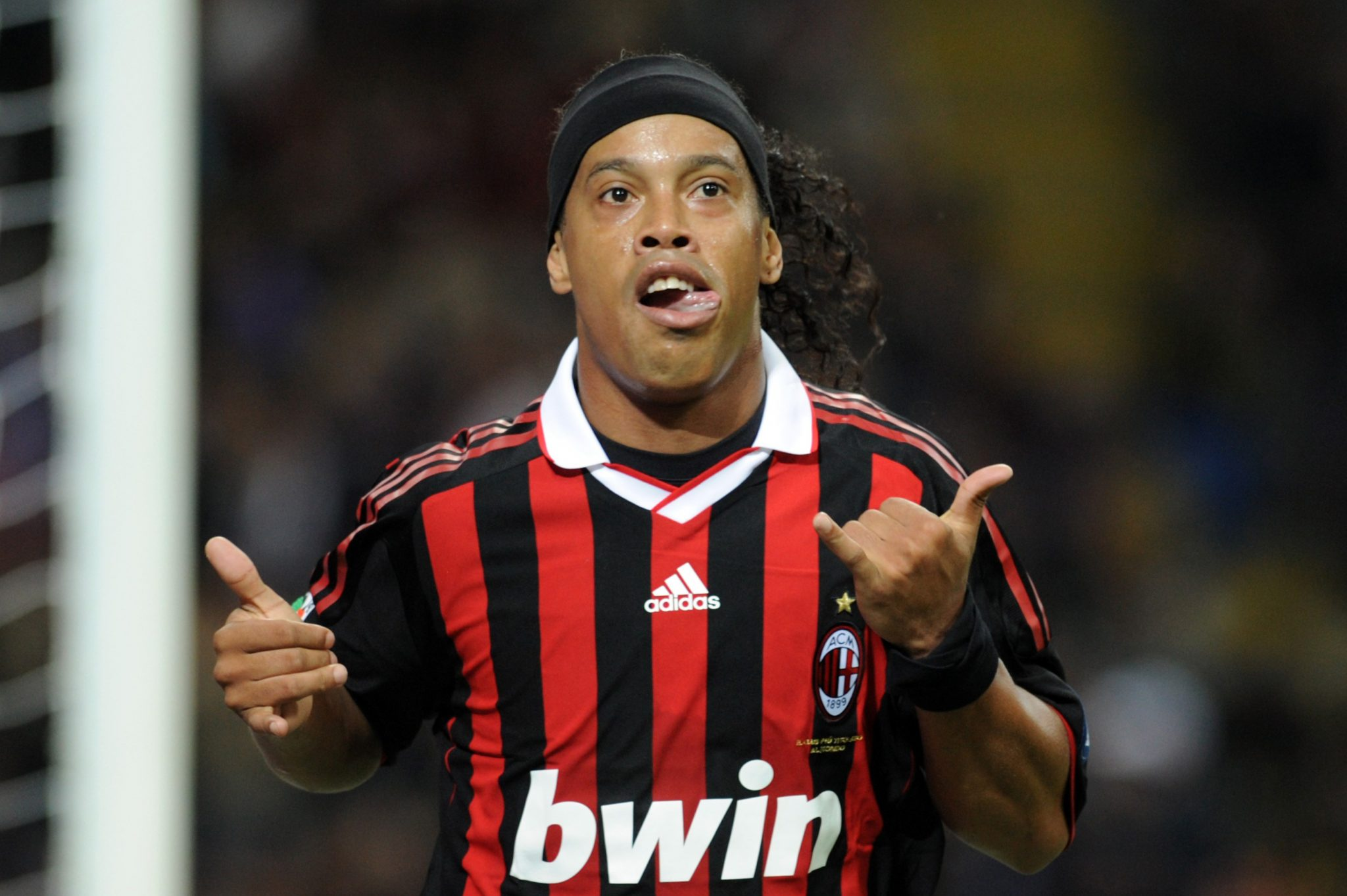
Ronaldinho doing the Shaka sign

== See also ==
- ILY sign
- List of gestures
- List of mudras (yoga)
- Manual communication
- Sign of the horns
- Thumb signal
