= Nancy Quinn =

American public figure (1919–2014)

- Nancy Quinn 1959

First Lady of Hawaii
- In role August 21, 1959 – December 3, 1962
- Governor: William F. Quinn
- Preceded by: Role created
- Succeeded by: Beatrice Burns

First Lady of the Territory of Hawaii
- In role August 29, 1957 – August 21, 1959
- Governor: William F. Quinn
- Preceded by: Pauline Nawahineokalai King
- Succeeded by: Statehood

Personal details
- Born: Nancy Ellen Witbeck; January 15, 1919 St. Louis, Missouri, U.S.
- Died: June 27, 2014 (aged 95) Honolulu, Hawaii, U.S.
- Spouse: William F. Quinn (m. 1942; died 2006)
- Children: 7

Nancy Ellen Quinn (January 15, 1919 – June 27, 2014) was an American public figure, former First Lady of Hawaii, and a prominent figure during Hawaii's transition to statehood. Quinn, the wife of Governor William F. Quinn, served as the last First Lady of the Territory of Hawaii from 1957 until 1959. She then served as the first First Lady of the new U.S. state of Hawaii from 1959 to 1962. According to Time Magazine, Nancy Quinn was the first person in the Territory of Hawaii to receive news that the bill granting Hawaiian statehood had been signed by President Dwight Eisenhower in 1959.

== Biography ==
Quinn was born Nancy Ellen Witbeck on January 15, 1919, in St. Louis, Missouri. She married her husband, William F. Quinn, on July 11, 1942, at a ceremony in St. Louis. The couple moved to Honolulu, Hawaii, in 1947 when William Quinn, a lawyer, was offered a job at the Robertson, Castle & Anthony law firm; he was promoted to partner in 1950. The couple had seven children: five prior to becoming Governor in 1957 and two children while they were serving as the Governor and First Lady of Hawaii.

William Quinn entered territorial politics during the 1950s. In August 1957, President Eisenhower appointed Quinn as Governor of the Territory of Hawaii, thereby making Nancy Quinn the first lady. The movement toward statehood continued to gather momentum under the Quinns. The Hawaii Admission Act was passed by the U.S. Congress in 1959 and signed into law by President Dwight Eisenhower. Time Magazine reported that First Lady Nancy Quinn was the first person in Hawaii to receive news that President Eisenhower had signed the Admission Act into law. Nancy Quinn had received the radiogram announcing Hawaii's admission at the door of their official residence, Washington Place. She delivered the news to Governor Quinn, but not before her four-year-old daughter, Cecily, had opened the envelope.

William Quinn won the 1959 Hawaiian gubernatorial election and Hawaii was admitted as the 50th state on August 21, 1959. Nancy Quinn became the first First Lady of Hawaii in the state's history. As the state and territorial first lady, Nancy Quinn balanced her official duties with raising their seven children, two of whom were born during her tenures as first lady. She lacked the budget for a social secretary for the first lady or a nurse for the children, which meant that Quinn had to organize the Governor's and First Lady's official events herself. Her work was chronicled in a biography of Governor Quinn called "No Ordinary Man," which was authored by Mary C. Kahulumana Richards. The couple left office in 1962 following after Quinn lost re-election in the 1962 gubernatorial election. The former governor died in 2006 following complications from a fall after 64 years of marriage.

Nancy Quinn remained an influential figure in Hawaiian political and civic life. In 2001, Quinn shared the Palaka Award with fellow former first ladies Jean Ariyoshi, Lynne Waihee, and Vicky Cayetano for service to Hawaii.

In 2009, the state of Hawaii and the 50th Anniversary of Statehood Commission honored Quinn to mark the 50th anniversary of Hawaiian statehood. Nancy Quinn was named as one of Hawaii's "50 Voices of Statehood." Other individuals honored alongside Quinn included U.S. Senators Daniel Akaka and Daniel Inouye, former Governor George Ariyoshi, Maui's first Mayor Elmer Cravalho, and then-Governor Linda Lingle.

Nancy Quinn died on June 27, 2014, at the age of 95. She was survived by her seven children - Cecily Quinn Affleck, Mary Kaiulani Quinn, William Jr., Timothy, Christopher, Gregory, and Stephen; eight grandchildren; and nine great-grandchildren. She was buried beside her husband in the National Memorial Cemetery of the Pacific. An official memorial service was held in September 2014.
