= First ladies of Hawaii =

First Lady of Hawaii
- Seal of Hawaii

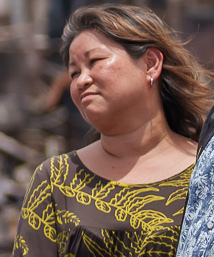
- Current; Jaime Green since December 5, 2022
- Style: Mrs. Green; Madam First Lady
- Residence: Washington Place
- Inaugural holder: Nancy Quinn
- Formation: August 21, 1959 (67 years ago)
- Website: Official website

The first lady of Hawaii is the title held by the wife of the governor of Hawaii, an unpaid ceremonial position. Territorial spouses carved out their roles in varied ways, from traditional wives who raised the children and supported their husbands, to philanthropists and society hostesses. Perhaps the most personal insight into any of the spouses came from territorial governor Sanford B. Dole. Three years after the death of Anna Prentice Cate Dole, he published a small book, "for those who loved and still love Anna—my dear wife" detailing their courtship and marriage, her love of poetry, and the admiration the first governor of the Territory of Hawaii had for his wife.

Nancy Quinn bridged the change of history as the wife of William F. Quinn, the last governor of the Territory of Hawaii and the first governor of Hawaii after it achieved statehood. She believed her position was to put family first, being her husband's support in a place and time when Hawaii had not yet worked out financial accommodations for care of the governor's family. Beatrice Burns was a nurse and polio survivor; so far, the only governor's spouse of Hawaii who served her term while in a wheelchair. The agendas of the first spouses have evolved as the country's social history has. Jean Ariyoshi helped reforest Hawaii with "A Million Trees of Aloha." Lynne Waihee put children's literacy first on her agenda. Vicky Cayetano was a business owner before she married Governor Ben Cayetano. Through her business acumen, a trust fund was created to erect a new residence for Hawaii's governor.

== First ladies of the Territory of Hawaii ==
Name	Image	Lifespan	In role	Governor	Notes	Ref(s)
Anna Prentice Cate Dole		(1843–1918)	1900–1903	Sanford B. Dole	Native of Castine, Maine. President of the Hawaiian Humane Society. Chairman of the 1915 Peace Society. Supported the Temperance League and the Red Cross. Served as First Lady of the Provisional Government of Hawaii (Jan 1893 – July 1894) and the Republic of Hawaii (July 1894 – June 1900).	
Helen Strong Carter		(1866–1945)	1903–1907	George R. Carter	Native of Rochester, New York. Philanthropist focused primarily on child dental health and welfare. Donated the Strong-Carter Dental Clinic. In 1944, honored by 20,000 students in recognition of her work for Hawaii's children. Donated money for a mobile field kitchen to be used in England's World War II efforts.	
Mary Dillingham Frear		(1870–1951)	1907–1913	Walter F. Frear	Born in Honolulu, descended from missionaries. Writer, poet, society hostess. Philanthropist, descendant of missionaries, heir to wealthy Dillingham fortune. Bequeathed her mansion to Punahou School.	
Vacant			1913–1918	Lucius E. Pinkham	Pinkham never married	
Margaret Theresa Morgan McCarthy		(1865–1934)	1918–1921	Charles J. McCarthy	Her parents were immigrants to Hawaii from Ireland. Tried to preserve historic artifacts in the Washington Place governor's residence. Prevented Hawaiian squatters from being evicted from the mansion's grounds. While her husband was governor, she opened the Donna Hotel and managed apartment buildings.	
Catharine McAlpine Farrington		(1870–1953)	1921–1929	Wallace R. Farrington	Born in San Francisco. Philanthropist, society hostess. President of the American Association of University Women. Trained as a teacher, she and Farrington began a shipboard romance en route to Honolulu, marrying a year later.	
Florence Bell Hackett Judd		(1885–1974)	1929–1934	Lawrence M. Judd	Born in Brooklyn, New York, moved to Hawaii in 1909. Her father was John Bell Hackett, her mother was Florence McKinstry Hackett.	
Vacant			1934–1942	Joseph Poindexter	Poindexter was a widower. His wife Margaret Conger died in 1918.	
Cecile White Stainback		(1892–1949)	1942–1951	Ingram Stainback	Raised in Missouri and Oklahoma. Met her husband on a golf course in Hawaii. When asked if she had political aspirations, she dismissed the idea with, "Keeping a home for my husband is enough." Died in surgery to remove a brain tumor.	
Geneva Rule Long		(1893–1985)	1951–1953	Oren E. Long	A native of Knox County, Tennessee. Taught at President William McKinley High School	
Pauline Nawahineokalai Evans		(1888–1977)	1953–1957	Samuel Wilder King	Born in Lahaina, Maui. Vice president of Women's Congressional Club. Her mother Hana K. Evans was a lady in waiting to Liliuokalani.	
Nancy Quinn		(1919–2004)	1957–1959	William F. Quinn	Raised in St. Louis Missouri.	

== First ladies of the State of Hawaii ==
Name	Image	Lifespan	Term start	Term end	Governor	Notes	Ref(s)
Nancy Quinn		(1919–2004)	August 21, 1959	December 3, 1962	William F. Quinn		
Beatrice Burns		(1906–1988)	December 3, 1962	December 2, 1974	John A. Burns	Restored the governor's Washington Place residence	
Jean Ariyoshi		(born 1934)	December 2, 1974	December 1, 1986	George Ariyoshi	"A Million Trees of Aloha" reforestation program.	
Lynne Waihee		(born 1946)	December 1, 1986	December 5, 1994	John D. Waihee III	Read To Me Program; children's literacy	
Lorraine Cayetano			December 2, 1994	1996	Ben Cayetano	Governor Cayetano and his first wife, Lorraine Cayetano, had separated in 1991, though they remained married during the first two years of his governorship. The marriage ended in divorce in 1996. They remain the only Governor and First Lady of Hawaii to divorce while in office.	
Position vacant			1996	May 5, 1997	Ben Cayetano	Cayetano divorced in 1996. No acting First Lady until his marriage to Vicky Cayetano in 1997.	
Vicky Cayetano		(born 1956)	May 5, 1997	December 2, 2002	Ben Cayetano	Vicky Tiu Cayetano married Governor Ben Cayetano on May 5, 1997, to become Hawaii's First Lady. Cayetano, a businesswoman, created the Washington Place Foundation to raise funds to build a new residence for the state's governor.	
Position vacant			December 2, 2002	December 6, 2010	Linda Lingle	Lingle was divorced prior to the governorship.	
Nancie Caraway		(born 1942)	December 6, 2010	December 1, 2014	Neil Abercrombie	Feminist author; human rights	
Dawn Ige		(born 1958)	December 1, 2014	December 5, 2022	David Ige	Led restoration of Washington Place for 175th Anniversary, launched Jump Start Breakfast program at the public schools and the Ohana Readers program to promote childhood literacy.	
Jaime Green		(born 1977)	December 5, 2022	present	Josh Green		

== See also ==
- Spouses of the mayors of Honolulu

== Bibliography ==
- Dole, Sanford B. (1921). Anna Cate Dole; memoranda by her husband. Honolulu Star Bulletin Press – via HathiTrust.
- McCarthy, Charles J. (1921). "AUTOBIOGRAPHICAL SKETCH OF GOVERNOR CHARLES J. McCARTHY OF HAWAII". The Journal of the American-Irish Historical Society. 19: 194–195 – via HathiTrust.
