= Beatrice Burns =

First Lady of Hawaii, married to Governor John A. Burns

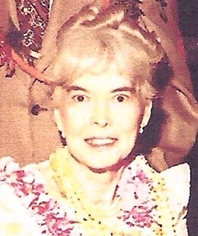

First Lady of Hawaii
- In role December 3, 1962 – December 2, 1974
- Governor: John A. Burns
- Preceded by: Nancy Quinn
- Succeeded by: Jean Ariyoshi

Personal details
- Born: Beatrice Majors Van Vleet; February 20, 1906 Sumpter, Oregon, U.S.
- Died: February 28, 1988 (aged 82) Honolulu, Hawaii, U.S.
- Spouse: John A. Burns (m. 1931; died 1975)
- Children: 4

Beatrice Majors Van Vleet Burns (February 2, 1906 – February 28, 1988) was the First Lady of Hawaii for three terms. Born in Oregon and raised in numerous states, she became a registered nurse, joined the United States Army Nurse Corps, and moved to Hawaii. She met Hawaii's future governor John A. Burns during a picnic at Hanauma Bay, when he was a college student. Together they had four children, one of whom was born premature and died when she was struck by poliomyelitis. She never fully recovered from her paralysis, but lived a full life as a wife and mother. While First Lady of Hawaii, she restored the governor's residence of Washington Place.

== Early life and marriage ==
She was born February 20, 1906, in Sumpter, Oregon, to teachers Thomas Stanton Van Fleet and Bessie Majors. The family moved dozens of times throughout California, Oregon, and Nevada.

After training as a registered nurse at the San Jose Hospital School of Nursing, she joined the United States Army Nurse Corps and was assigned to Letterman Army Hospital in San Francisco, before being transferred to Schofield Barracks on Oahu in 1930. John A. Burns (Jack) was a student at the University of Hawaii with a night switchboard job at the Honolulu Star-Bulletin. Their first date was a group picnic at Hanauma Bay. Afterwards, they continued dating, eventually deciding to marry. He dropped out of college and left the newspaper to take a better-paying job with the Hawaiian Pineapple Company. They married at Schofield Barracks on June 8, 1931. She was a lieutenant at the time.

When the Great Depression affected jobs at the pineapple cannery, they joined her parents working on a farm in Mendocino County, California. They returned to Hawaii in 1932, with Jack working at another cannery, eventually joining the Honolulu Police Department. Their first child, John Jr. (Jack Jr.), was born in 1932, followed by a daughter, Mary Beth, in 1934.

== Polio ==
While pregnant in 1935, Beatrice became ill with poliomyelitis during her final trimester and delivered a premature son, William, who died within hours. The disease left her paralyzed. Medical practice in that era dictated that she be completely immobilized; nevertheless, she became pregnant again. Advised by her doctors to abort the fetus, she and Jack opted for alternative treatment from Seishiro Okazaki of the Nikko Sanatorium of Restoration Massage in Honolulu. Okazaki freed her from the medical splints placed on her, massaged her and used a therapy of exercise and hot seaweed-water baths. The treatments were considered a success in that she regained the use of her arms and head and began to see overall physical improvements. However, she never regained use of her legs and spent the rest of her life in a wheelchair. She gave birth to James Seishiro Burns (Jim) in 1937. She had not converted to Jack's Catholic faith before their marriage, but did so after Jim's birth.

== Political wife ==
At the end of World War II, Jack began his rise in politics. He left the police force and bought the Kalama Liquor Store. He was often away with political involvement and hiring employees was a financial drain on the business. Beatrice eventually ran the business herself, with her youngest son Jim pushing her home in her wheelchair in the evening.

When Jack ran for a seat as delegate to the U.S. House of Representatives from Hawaii Territory in 1956, Beatrice's determination to live a normal life with polio became his political asset with a write-up titled "The Woman Behind the Man: The Story of Beatrice Burns". After his election, they lived in a Washington, D.C. apartment, where she saw less of her husband. She made his meals at home, and he took her for Sunday sight-seeing trips. The Burns children were grownup and living individual lives in the mainland United States. She entertained political wives with small gatherings in the apartment, as her husband put his legislative efforts towards helping Hawaii achieve statehood. With the Territory of Hawaii set to become the 50th state in the union on August 21, 1959, Beatrice, like many of his colleagues in Washington, thought Jack would throw his hat in the ring for the United States Senate. Instead, he chose to pursue the office of Governor of Hawaii. When she learned this from her eldest son, her immediate response was disbelief. Jack lost the 1959 gubernatorial election to William F. Quinn.

The couple celebrated their 30th wedding anniversary at the Royal Hawaiian Hotel in Waikiki. When he ran for the office a second time, Jack won the 1962 gubernatorial race in Hawaii. The week before the election, the Honolulu Star-Bulletin ran cooking recipes from the wives of candidates. Beatrice's was West Indian shrimp curry. She was an active First Lady of Hawaii during all three of his terms as governor, hosting diplomats and legislators, and planning her children's weddings. Unlike their family home, Beatrice managed a household staff in the governor's residence of Washington Place. The Burns moved into a decaying and termite-infested house and she was in charge of restoring it. She had learned the value of at-home entertaining as a congressional wife. Persuaded one luncheon at a time in the run-down mansion, the legislature appropriated $50,000 for repairs.

At the March 1968 National Governors Conference in Washington D. C., the wives went with Lady Bird Johnson to a planting of dogwood trees on the Potomac River. It had been raining and temperatures were below freezing, but Beatrice rolled her chair into the mud and planted trees. As they approached Jack's third gubernatorial term in 1970, Beatrice reflected with satisfaction on her overhaul of the landscaping at Washington Place. There was one gardener and no budget to cover it. The landscaping issue was solved partially through a legislative budget appropriation, but largely through volunteers. Her request for help on the lawn and gardens was met by unpaid citizens of Hawaii who regularly worked on the gubernatorial landscaping for years.

== Later years and death ==
Their son Jim became Chief Judge of Hawaii Intermediate Court of Appeals and president of the American Judicature Society. After George Ariyoshi won the 1974 election for governor, Beatrice and Jim represented the already very sick Jack at the inaugural. Jack died on April 5, 1975, and was buried at the National Cemetery of the Pacific.

Beatrice died on February 28, 1988, and was buried next to her husband.

== Bibliography ==
- Boylan, Dan (2000). John A. Burns. University of Hawai'i Press – via Project MUSE (subscription required). ISBN 978-0-8248-6318-0.
