= Mark Jernigan =

American politician (born 1959)

Member of the Hawaii House of Representatives
- In office 2002–2004
- Succeeded by: Josh Green
- Constituency: 6th district

Personal details
- Born: June 9, 1959 (age 67) Eugene, Oregon, U.S.
- Party: Republican
- Occupation: Businessman

Mark A. Jernigan (born June 9, 1959) is an American politician from the Hawaii Republican Party. He was a member of the Hawaii House of Representatives from 2002 to 2004. Following his election loss he focused on family private businesses in Hawaii.

== Life and career ==
Jernigan was born on June 9, 1959, in Eugene, Oregon. He moved to Hawaii in 1989 and founded Soil Plus, a gardening and landscaping company. Prior to running for office, Jernigan was a vice chair of the Hawaii County Republican Party. While serving in office, Jernigan was the only legislator from the Big Island to vote against the Gas Cap Law. After losing reelection in 2004, Jernigan returned to managing Soil Plus full-time.

== Elections ==
Jernigan ran for the House in District 6 in 2002 as a Republican. The seat was open, as it was a newly-created seat, and Jernigan defeated Democrat Marni Herkes in the general election by over 1,000 votes. In 2004 he was challenged by Josh Green (who would go on to become Governor of Hawaii). During the campaign, Jernigan was heavily targeted by mailers by the Democratic Party of Hawaii which accused him of missing nearly half of committee meetings and of voting against construction projects. Both accusations were determined to be untrue by the Clean Campaigns Project, a bipartisan campaign reform organization. The Democratic Party of Hawaii both referred to the accusations as a "typo" but also said that the mailings were "firm and factual." Jernigan lost to Green in the general election by 8 points, which Green attributed to "out work[ing]" Jernigan.
