= Eloise Tungpalan =

American politician

Member of the Hawaii Senate from the 17th district
- In office January 20, 1993 – January 18, 1995
- Preceded by: Anthony K. U. Chang
- Succeeded by: David Ige

Member of the Hawaii Senate from the 22nd district
- In office December 17, 1987 – January 20, 1993
- Preceded by: Joseph T. Kuroda
- Succeeded by: Gerald T. Hagino

Member of the Hawaii House of Representatives from the 44th district
- In office January 16, 1985 – December 17, 1987
- Preceded by: Terrance W. H. Tom
- Succeeded by: Roland Kotani

Member of the Hawaii House of Representatives from the 34th district
- In office January 19, 1983 – January 16, 1985
- Preceded by: District created
- Succeeded by: Mike Liu

Member of the Hawaii House of Representatives from the 19th district
- In office January 21, 1981 – January 19, 1983
- Preceded by: Donald T. Masutani Jr.
- Succeeded by: Marvin S. C. Dang

Personal details
- Born: Eloise Yamashita Tungpalan; July 1, 1945 (age 81)
- Party: Democratic

Eloise Tungpalan (born July 1, 1945) is an American politician who served in the Hawaii House of Representatives from 1981 to 1987 and in the Hawaii Senate from 1987 to 1995.
