= Jean Ariyoshi =

American First Lady of Hawaii (born 1933)

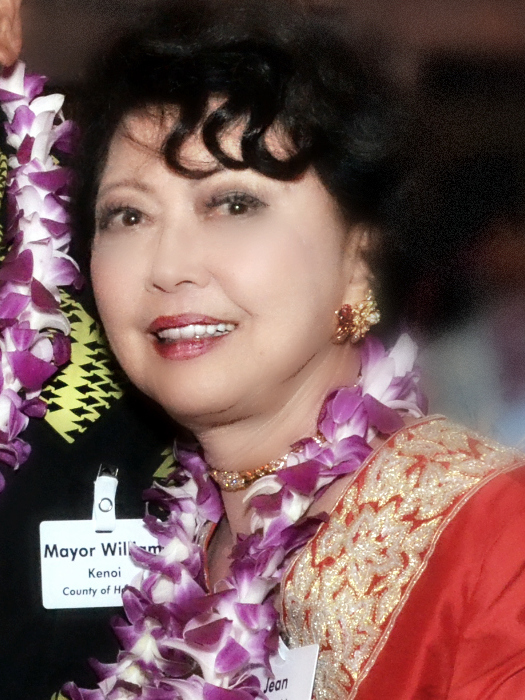
- Ariyoshi in 2011

First Lady of Hawaii
- In role December 2, 1974 – December 1, 1986
- Governor: George Ariyoshi
- Preceded by: Beatrice Burns
- Succeeded by: Lynne Waihee

Second Lady of Hawaii
- In role December 2, 1970 – December 2, 1974
- Governor: George Ariyoshi
- Preceded by: Lois Hanawalt Gill
- Succeeded by: Eiko Doi

Personal details
- Born: Jean Hayashi; October 30, 1933 (age 92) Wahiawa, Territory of Hawaii
- Spouse: George Ariyoshi (m. 1955; died 2026)
- Children: 3

Jean Hayashi Ariyoshi (born October 30, 1933) is the widow of former Hawaii governor George Ariyoshi and the First Lady of Hawaii from 1974 to 1986. Among her accomplishments were the reclamation of missing artifacts from the governor's mansion Washington Place, cataloguing the contents, and opening the house to docent-led tours. She promoted "A Million Trees of Aloha" reforestation of Hawaii that resulted in 1,138,000 trees being planted.

== Early life and family ==
She was born in Wahiawa, Hawaii, in a home that doubled as her father's photography studio. After graduating from Leilehua High School, she attended the University of Hawaii. While working her way through college, she booked customer reservations for Hawaiian Airlines and sold merchandise at Liberty House. After earning her teaching certificate and graduating from the university, she taught at Admiral Arthur W. Radford High School.

She and future governor George Ariyoshi met in 1953, and married in 1955. The couple are the parents of daughter Lynn and sons Todd and Donn. All of their children attended an afternoon Japanese language school in Hawaii, because George believed that being multi-lingual and understanding their cultural heritage would be an asset to them.

== First lady of Hawaii ==
Continuing the Washington Place restoration efforts of her predecessor Beatrice Burns, Jean was given a budget of $85,000. Many of the historical pieces in the house had begun to deteriorate, and were subject to termites. She began to reclaim what items she could that had been purchased and removed by previous governors. Focusing on the rooms seen by the public, she restored a portrait of Liliʻuokalani in the dining room, and spent years bringing the house up to quality for public tours. She had every item catalogued by faculty members of the University of Hawaii, and part of the downstairs was turned into a museum. Docents were trained to conduct public tours.

In 1985, Jean began the statewide "A Million Trees of Aloha" reforestation program in commemoration of the 150th anniversary of the sugar industry, and the 100th anniversary of Japanese immigration. In response, various organizations and individuals contributed to the effort that resulted in 1,138,000 trees planted throughout the state.
