= Dawn Ige =

Former First Lady of Hawaii

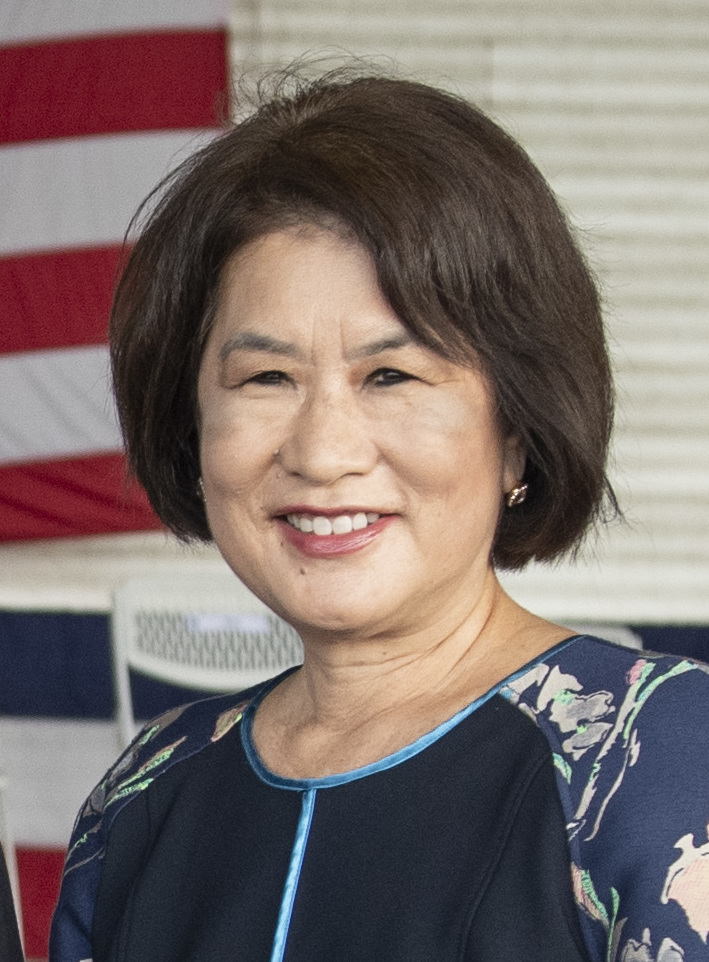
- Ige in 2021

First Lady of Hawaii
- In role December 1, 2014 – December 5, 2022
- Governor: David Ige
- Preceded by: Nancie Caraway
- Succeeded by: Jaime Green

Personal details
- Born: Dawn Amano; March 30, 1959 (age 67) Ewa, Territory of Hawaii
- Party: Democratic
- Spouse: David Ige (m. 1982)
- Children: 3
- Education: University of Hawaii; Chaminade University of Honolulu
- Profession: Teacher

Dawn Amano-Ige (born March 30, 1959) is an American educator who was the first lady of Hawaii as the wife of governor David Ige.

== Early life and education ==
Ige (née Amano) graduated from James Campbell High School. She earned her bachelor's degree in journalism from the University of Hawaii at Manoa and master's in business administration from Chaminade University of Honolulu.

== Career ==
Prior to serving as First Lady of Hawaii, Ige was a vice principal at Kanoelani Elementary School in Waipahu, Hawaii. Before pursuing elementary education, Ige worked as a marketing director for Kapiolani Health Care Systems and a public relations account executive.

=== First Lady of Hawaii ===
Ige advocated for child nutrition and literacy efforts. In 2018, Ige led the launch of the Hawaii State Department of Education's Jump Start Breakfast program to encourage morning meals. During the COVID-19 pandemic, she worked with the public schools to provide free meals and with nonprofits to create meal kits for families. She continues to serve on the national No Kid Hungry Leadership Council.

In 2019, Ige also launched the Ohana Readers literacy program in partnership with the Dolly Parton Imagination Library and the Hawaii State Public Library System, offering free books mailed to families with children under 5 living on Molokai, Lanai, and parts of Kauai and Hawaii Island.

She also led the restoration of the second floor of Washington Place and the creation of its website, washingtonplace.hawaii.gov. For Washington Place's 175th anniversary in 2022, Ige hosted celebrations, tours, and educational programs, including a large keiki hula.

She is considering a political run in the future.
