= Roland Kotani =

American politician

- Roland Kotani, circa 1980s.
- Born: Roland Motoi Kotani; June 15, 1954; Honolulu, Territory of Hawaii, U.S.
- Died: July 28, 1989 (aged 35); Honolulu, Hawaii, U.S.
- Education: Yale University
- Occupation: Politician
- Years active: 3
- Known for: Member of the Hawaii State House of Representatives
- Children: 1

Roland Motoi Kotani (June 15, 1954 – July 28, 1989) was an American politician and Democratic member of the Hawaii State House of Representatives. Kotani served as assistant majority floor leader and represented the Pearl City Pacific Palisades area.

He was killed by his estranged wife Grace Kotani on July 28, 1989, at the age of 35.

== Biography ==
A Japanese American, Kotani graduated from Yale University and in 1984 he was the editor of Ka Huliau (The Turning Point), a self-described "Hawaiian Grassroots Journal." The journal was launched in early 1983 and published every six weeks, with an estimated circulation of 3,000. Kotani's particular focus was on the resurgence of the local people's movement. He worked as an editorial assistant for The Hawaii Herald. Kotani authored the book The Japanese in Hawaii: A Century of Struggle in 1985, writing extensively on the 100th Infantry Battalion. During this time, he worked as an assistant to the Governor of Hawaii and Lieutenant Governor of Hawaii. He was nominated to the Hawaii State House of Representatives in 1987 by the State Governor John Waihee to replace representative Eloise Tungpalan who was appointed to the Hawaii State Senate. Kotani was later elected to the House unopposed in 1988.

He married Grace Sadako Imura in 1979 and they had a daughter together. The couple separated in February 1989 and became estranged. On July 28, 1989, as a result of a domestic dispute, Grace attacked Kotani with a hammer and beat him to death. The killing took place in a rented duplex in Honolulu. The medical examination report stated Kotani sustained blunt force trauma to the head. Grace later presented herself to the Honolulu Police Department and confessed to the murder, before excusing herself to the restroom where she fatally shot herself.

=== Legacy ===
The University of Hawaii at Manoa launched the Roland Kotani Scholarship in his memory at the University's Department of Ethnic Studies. Kotani was also acknowledged in several state resolutions passed by the Hawaii State Legislature. Kotani's murder is studied in detail as a case study in Hawaii crime scene investigation books.
