= Vicky Cayetano =

First Lady of Hawaii (1997–2002)

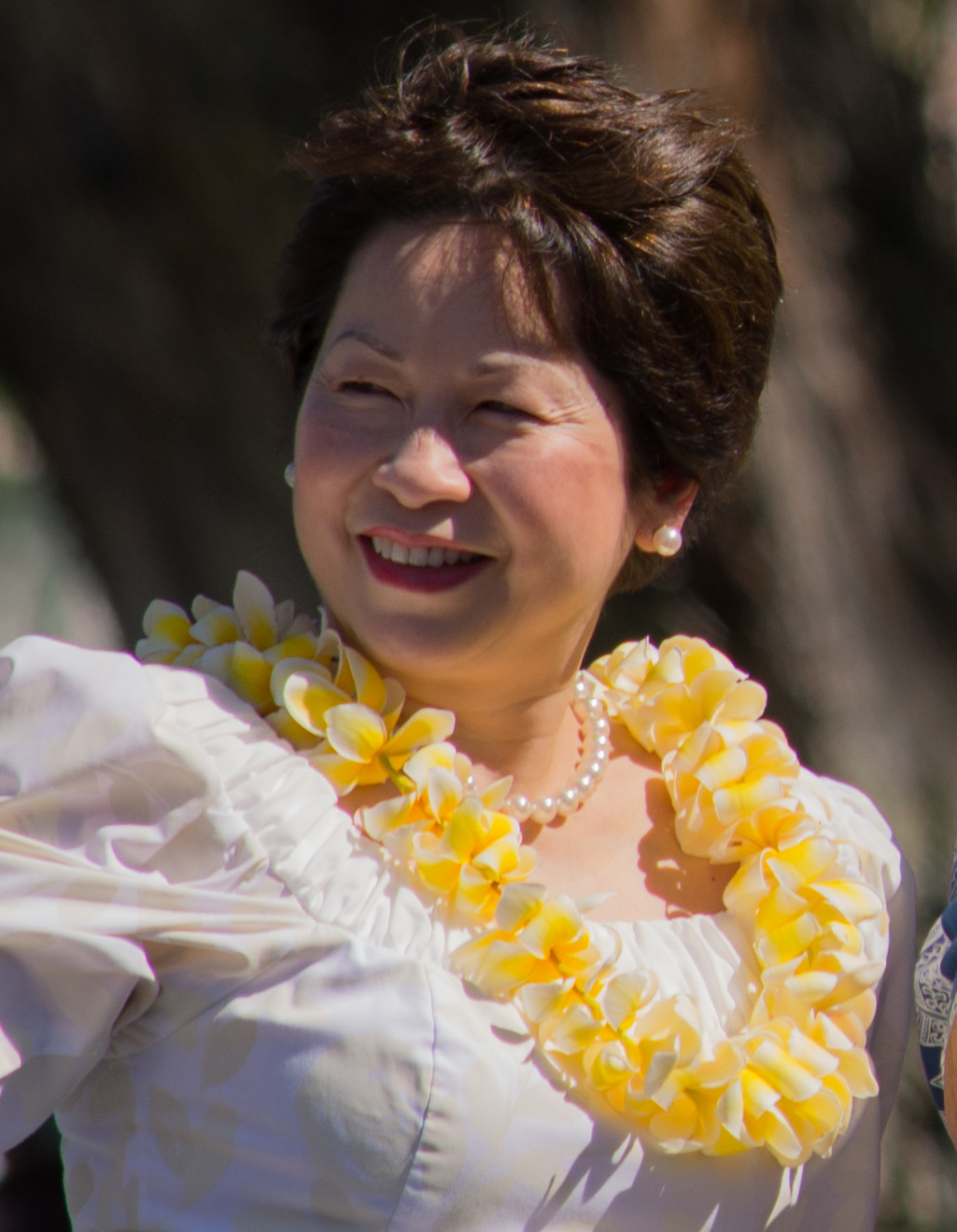

First Lady of Hawaii
- In role May 5, 1997 – December 2, 2002
- Governor: Ben Cayetano
- Preceded by: Lynne Waihee
- Succeeded by: Nancie Caraway (2010)

Personal details
- Born: Vicky Tiu; 1955 or 1956 (age 69–70) Manila, Philippines
- Party: Republican (Before 1997); Democratic (1997–present)
- Spouse: Ben Cayetano (m. 1997)
- Children: 5, including 3 stepchildren

Vicky Tiu Cayetano (born 1955 or 1956) is an American businesswoman and politician who was the first lady of Hawaii from 1997 to 2002. She and former governor Ben Cayetano were married on May 5, 1997, in Washington Place. During her tenure, she was instrumental in the construction of a new governor's residence building, turning the old Washington Place into a museum. She was a Democratic candidate in the 2022 Hawaii gubernatorial election. During her gubernatorial campaign Vicky Cayetano's campaign was found guilty of using illegal campaign tactics by coordinating with an outside PAC.

== Early life ==
Vicky Tiu was born in Manila, Philippines, one of nine musically talented children of Pat and William Tiu, who are Chinese Filipinos of Hokkien descent. She and her brother and sisters acted in movies in the early 1960s: Cayetano had a supporting role in It Happened at the World's Fair with Elvis Presley. Her sisters Ginny and Elizabeth, and their brother, Alexander, were in Girls! Girls! Girls! with Presley. After the family moved to San Francisco, Vicky and a group of her friends started a travel agency when she was a teenager. She later attended Stanford University in California, but did not graduate.

== Career ==
In 1988, she helped to start United Laundry Company to service hotels and hospitals, eventually becoming president and CEO.

=== First lady ===
After marrying Ben Cayetano, she continued to operate the laundry company, but spent less time on it. Her daily schedule was distributed to her employees and she was available if needed. The evening hours were devoted to her family, giving individual time to her teenage children.

In 1999, she participated in the Honolulu Habitat for Humanity's Women Build. She was named 1999 Woman of Distinction by Hawaii's Girl Scouts for her work in motivating young women.

In 2001, she proposed turning Washington Place into a museum telling the story of Lili‘uokalani. Toward that end, she created the Washington Place Foundation to raise funds to build a new residence for the state's governor. The new residence, constructed directly behind Washington Place, was finished in time for the new governor Linda Lingle.

=== Recent career ===
After her tenure as first lady, Cayetano continued to oversee United Laundry Services. She was named Sales Person of the Year for 2011 by Sales & Marketing Executives International, Honolulu Chapter.

In 2018, the 30th anniversary of United Laundry Services, Cayetano was honored with the Pacific Business News "Women Who Mean Business" Career Achievement Award. The following year, the University of Hawaii's School of Travel Industry Management presented Cayetano with the 2019 Legacy in Tourism Award.

Cayetano also volunteers on the board of directors for the Hawaii Symphony Orchestra.

=== 2022 gubernatorial campaign ===
On August 30, 2021, Cayetano announced her candidacy for the 2022 Hawaii gubernatorial election to succeed term-limited governor David Ige. On August 13, 2022, Cayetano lost the primary to Josh Green, 63%-21%.

In 2023, the Hawaii State Campaign Spending Commission fined Cayetano $1,000, finding evidence of inappropriate coordination between her campaign and a super PAC to launch negative ads against her opponent Josh Green.

== Personal life ==
Cayetano first married a financial consultant in California and had two children. The family later moved to Hawaii. She divorced her first husband in 1992.

Ben Cayetano was the sitting governor of Hawaii, with three grown children with his first wife, Lorraine Cayetano. They were separated for five years, then divorced in 1996 after 37 years of marriage. Cayetano and Tiu met while both were working out at the Honolulu Club fitness center. They were married one-and-a-half years later in the governor's official residence on May 5, 1997.
