= Nancie Caraway =

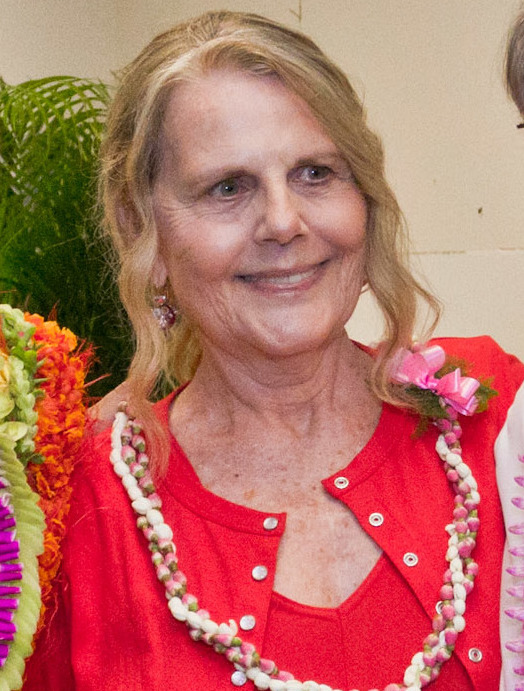

First Lady of Hawaii
- In role December 6, 2010 – December 1, 2014
- Governor: Neil Abercrombie
- Preceded by: Vicky Cayetano (2002)
- Succeeded by: Dawn Ige

Personal details
- Born: Nancie Ellen Caraway; February 2, 1942 (age 84)
- Spouse: Neil Abercrombie (m. 1981)

Nancie Ellen Caraway (born February 2, 1942) is the former First Lady of the U.S. state of Hawaii from 2010 to 2014. She is the spouse of former First Congressional District U.S. Representative and former Governor of Hawaii Neil Abercrombie. Caraway is a University of Hawaiʻi at Mānoa political scientist, feminist scholar and activist, a member of the university's Globalization Research Center and its Director of Women's Human Rights, leading its Trafficking Project. She is also a mentor and lecturer at the East–West Center, and has worked as a political consultant.

Caraway was born in Alabama and arrived in Hawaii from Houston, Texas. She received her bachelor of arts degree in political science at the University of Hawaiʻi at Mānoa in 1980. She was a resident of New York City while studying for her Master of Science degree in journalism at Columbia University. She married her husband, Neil Abercrombie, in 1981 in Palm Springs, California. She returned to Hawaii and completed a master of arts in 1986 and doctorate in 1991, both in political science.

Following her husband to Washington, D.C., where he served in the United States Congress, Caraway became an assistant professor at Georgetown University, George Washington University and American University.

An author, Caraway won the Victoria Schuck Award—an international award for the best book on women and politics—from the American Political Science Association for her 1992 book, Segregated Sisterhood: Racism and the Politics of American Feminism, also the title of her University of Hawaiʻi at Mānoa at doctoral dissertation.
