= Senator Whalen =

Senator Whalen may refer to:

- Charles W. Whalen Jr. (1920–2011), Ohio State Senate
- Paul Whalen (born 1962), Hawaii State Senate

== See also ==
- Senator Whelan (disambiguation)
