= 1962 Hawaii gubernatorial election =

- November 6, 1962
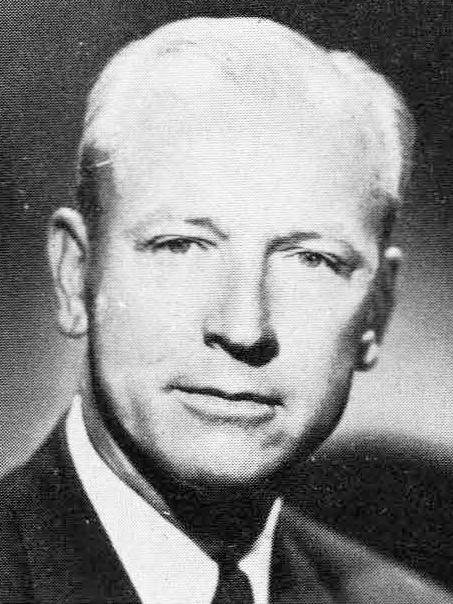

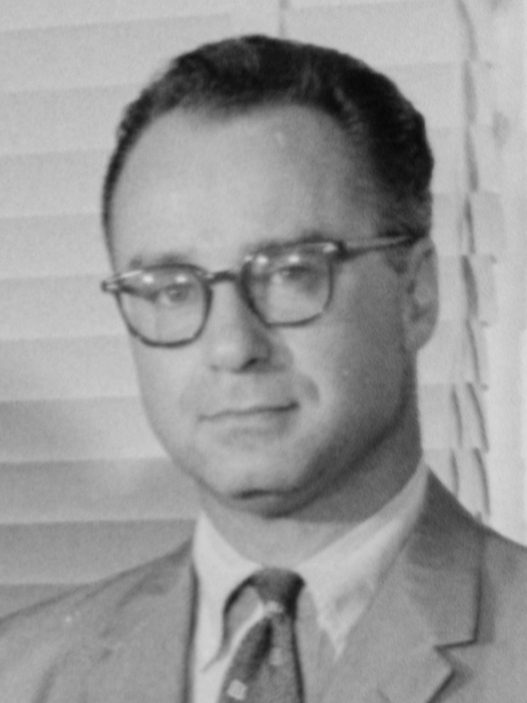
Nominee	John A. Burns	William F. Quinn
Party	Democratic	Republican
Running mate	William S. Richardson	Calvin McGregor
Popular vote	114,308	81,707
Percentage	58.32%	41.68%
- County results Burns: 50–60% 60–70%
Governor before election
William F. Quinn
Republican
Elected Governor
John A. Burns
Democratic

The 1962 Hawaii gubernatorial election was Hawaii's second gubernatorial election. The election was held on November 6, 1962, and resulted in a victory for the Democratic candidate, former Territorial Delegate John A. Burns over Republican William F. Quinn, the incumbent Governor of Hawaii. The election was a rematch between the candidates of the previous election, with the outcome reversed. Burns received more votes than Quinn in every county in the state.

This election was the first of ten consecutive Democratic gubernatorial victories in Hawaii, a streak not broken until the election of Republican Linda Lingle in 2002. This is the only time that an incumbent governor of Hawaii lost a general election.

== Primaries ==
William F. Quinn experienced a contested Republican primary against Lt. Gov. James Kealoha, winning 57.06%-42.94%. Burns faced only nominal opposition in the Democratic primary, receiving 90.19% of the vote.

== General election ==
=== Results ===
Hawaii gubernatorial election, 1962
Party	Candidate	Votes	%	±%
Democratic	John A. Burns	114,308	58.32	+9.66
Republican	William F. Quinn (incumbent)	81,707	41.68	−9.44
Majority		32,601	16.63	+14.18
Turnout		196,015		
Democratic gain from Republican		Swing		

==== By county ====
County	John Burns Democratic		William Quinn Republican		Margin		Total votes cast
County	#	%	#	%	#	%	Total votes cast
Hawaii	14,791	60.7%	9,592	39.3%	5,199	21.4%	24,383
Honolulu	84,907	58.6%	59,883	41.4%	25,024	17.2%	144,790
Kauaʻi	5,746	54.4%	4,811	45.6%	935	8.8%	10,557
Maui	8,864	54.4%	7,421	45.6%	1,443	8.8%	16,285
Totals	114,308	58.3%	81,707	41.7%	32,601	16.6%	196,015

Counties that flipped from Republican to Democratic

- Honolulu
