= Virginia Isbell =

Hawaiian politician (1932–2019)

Virginia Isbell (May 8, 1932 - September 19, 2019) was a former educator and politician on Hawaiʻi Island.

Isbell was born in Montana. Her father was an immigrant from Italy while her mother was born in the United States. She married Donald Isbell in 1953. They moved to Hawaii in 1960.

== Career ==
After a career as a teacher, Isbell became a community volunteer and served from 1980 to 1996 in the Hawaii House of Representatives for district 4, later redistricted to number 5. In the 1991–1994 sessions she was chair of the housing committee.

Originally in the Republican Party of Hawaii, Isbell switched to the Democratic Party of Hawaii in 1988. In 1996 she ran for Mayor of Hawaii County but lost. She ran again for the state house but lost in 1998 and 2000 to Paul Whalen. In 2002 she ran against Whalen for the Hawaii Senate 3rd district, but lost. In 2004 she was elected as Hawaii County Council member representing District 7, from Keauhou to Honaunau in the Kona District. She was defeated in the primaries by Brenda Ford in 2006. A mere nine votes was the determining factor. However, due to the closeness of the election, both candidates participated in the November 2006 general election, which was won by Ford.

Isbell was secretary of the board of directors for the Kona Soil and Water Conservation District since at least 2008. Even in her 70s, she swam regularly in the ocean at Kailua-Kona, including distance competitions and the swim leg of the Lavaman Triathlon.

In 2008 Isbell ran against Josh Green for Whalen's state senate and lost in the September primary. Green, a physician and state representative, had accumulated over $120,000 for funding his campaign, while Isbell noted that she would have been a full-time legislator. Her daughter Iwalani Isbell (born 1963) is a swimwear designer.

Isbell was a Latter-day Saint.

Party political offices
Preceded by Benjamin F. Dillingham II	Republican nominee for Lieutenant Governor of Hawaii; 1978	Succeeded by Pat Saiki
