= Lynne Waihee =

First Lady of Hawaii (1986–1994)

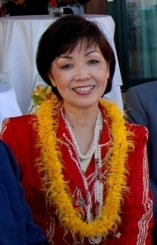

First Lady of Hawaii
- In role December 1, 1986 – December 5, 1994
- Governor: John D. Waiheʻe III
- Preceded by: Jean Ariyoshi
- Succeeded by: Vicky Cayetano (1997)

Second Lady of Hawaii
- In role December 2, 1982 – December 2, 1986
- Lieutenant Governor: John D. Waiheʻe III
- Preceded by: James Aldrich King (as Second Gentleman)
- Succeeded by: Lorraine Gueco Cayetano

Personal details
- Born: Lynne Kobashigawa; December 9, 1946 (age 79) Territory of Hawaii
- Spouse: John D. Waiheʻe III
- Children: 2, including John D. Waiheʻe IV
- Education: Andrews University

Lynne Kobashigawa Waihee (born December 9, 1946) was First Lady of Hawaii from 1986 to 1994. Born in Hawaii and married to the first Native Hawaiian governor of the state, she was raised in Kalihi. Educated at Andrews University, her first vocation was teaching. She used her position as first lady to raise the standard of children's literacy in Hawaii. She helped found a children's museum and was a role model for volunteer service in the community, instituting the First Lady's Outstanding Volunteers Program.

== Background ==
She was one of five children born in Hawaii to Toshio and Matsue Kobashigawa. Both parents were of Okinawan ancestry, and her mother was a first-generation Hawaii immigrant from Okinawa Island. Her father died when she was 5 years old, and her mother raised the children in Kalihi as a single parent.

She and John Waihe'e III were both 1964 graduates of the private Seventh-day Adventist Hawaiian Mission Academy. Both graduated from Andrews University in Michigan, where Lynne began her teaching career. The couple married in Michigan, and their children were born there. John involved himself in small-town community activism while in Michigan, with people already predicting his rise in politics.

== As first lady ==
The Waihee family returned to Hawaii in 1971. A proponent of children's literacy, Waihee became a teacher at Hawaiian Mission Academy. Her husband's victory in the 1986 gubernatorial election made him the first Native Hawaiian elected to the governorship from any state of the United States. At the time of his inauguration, the family continued to live in a modest Kalihi condo while Washington Place was undergoing work.

For her first luncheon at the White House with Nancy Reagan, she had students at the University of Hawaii at Manoa design her a dress. Eventually she commissioned the students to design an entire wardrobe for her, which was featured as the First Lady Collection at a fashion show at the Sheraton Waikiki Hotel.

Waihee is an advocate of reading aloud to children to inspire their interest in literature. As first lady, she toured Hawaii, stating, "I want every child in the state to be read to everyday." She was the co-founder, and is president, of the non-profit organization Read To Me International.

While her husband was governor, she helped found the Hawaii Children's Museum as honorary chair. In 1987, she was honorary chairman of the development of the Okinawa Cultural Center "Okinawa Bunka Kaikan" when it was first constructed in Waipio, Hawaii.

During her eight years as First Lady of Hawaii, Waihee routinely put in 18-hour days. She was credited for raising the bar of volunteerism, having created the First Lady's Outstanding Volunteers Program. The national Girl Scouts named her "Woman of Distinction" for her service in Hawaii. The Adult Friends for Youth presented her with the Service to Hawaii's Youth Award. She served on numerous charitable and institutional boards in order to champion the welfare of Hawaii's children. During her tenure in the job, she served on the National Institute for Literacy and the National Center for Family Literacy.

== Later years ==
Waihee has continued promoting the welfare of Hawaii's children, with an emphasis on children's literacy.
