= Senator Whelan =

Senator Whelan may refer to:

- Eugene Whelan (1924–2013), Senate of Canada
- Jim Whelan (1948–2017), New Jersey State Senate
- John Whelan (Irish politician) (born 1961), Senate of Ireland
- John W. Whelan (1845–1906), Wisconsin State Senate

== See also ==
- Senator Whalen (disambiguation)
