= Jaime Green =

First Lady of Hawaii (born 1977)

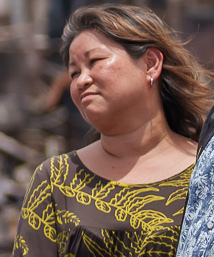
- Green in 2023

First Lady of Hawaiʻi
- Current
- Assumed role December 5, 2022
- Governor: Josh Green
- Preceded by: Dawn Ige

Second Lady of Hawaiʻi
- In office December 3, 2018 – December 5, 2022
- Preceded by: Kathleen Chin
- Succeeded by: Michael Luke (as Second Gentleman)

Personal details
- Born: Jaime Kanani Ushiroda; May 11, 1977 (age 49) Kaneohe, Hawaiʻi, U.S.
- Party: Democratic
- Spouse: Josh Green (m. 2006)
- Children: 2
- Education: Brown University (BA); University of Hawaii (JD)
- Profession: Attorney

Jaime Kanani Green (née Ushiroda; born May 11, 1977) is an American attorney who has served as the first lady of Hawaiʻi since 2022 as the wife of Governor Josh Green. She previously served as the Second Lady of Hawaiʻi from 2018 to 2022, during her husband's term as lieutenant governor.

== Early life and education ==
Jaime Kanani Ushiroda was born on May 11, 1977. She grew up in Kāneʻohe and attended ʻIolani School, graduating in 1995. She graduated from Brown University in 1999 and earned her Juris Doctor from William S. Richardson School of Law of University of Hawaiʻi in 2002. Her mother, Yvonne Makaimoku Ushiroda, was Native Hawaiian.

== Career ==
She practiced law for two years before deciding to focus her career on child advocacy. She worked for Project Visitation which serves siblings who are separated by the foster care system, and as a volunteer guardian ad litem for the Hawaiʻi State Judiciary. She is also listed as a member of Green Health International LLC and serves on the board of directors of the social services organizations Hale Kipa and Pacific Gateway Center.

== First Lady of Hawaii (2022–present) ==
As first lady of Hawaiʻi, she plans to advocate for children and families through supporting food banks and advancing childhood literacy. Other priorities include mental health services and the Hawaii State Department of Hawaiian Home Lands backlog. She also hopes to develop a Native Hawaiian Cultural Center.

== Personal life ==
She married Josh Green in 2006. The couple met at the Hawaiʻi State Capitol when she was clerking for Senator Suzanne Chun Oakland and Josh Green was a state representative. They have two children, who are the first young children to live in the governor's mansion since 1986.

She was raised in The Church of Jesus Christ of Latter-day Saints.

== See also ==
- Josh Green (politician)
- First ladies of Hawaiʻi
