= David Ige =

Governor of Hawaii from 2014 to 2022

- 伊芸 豊
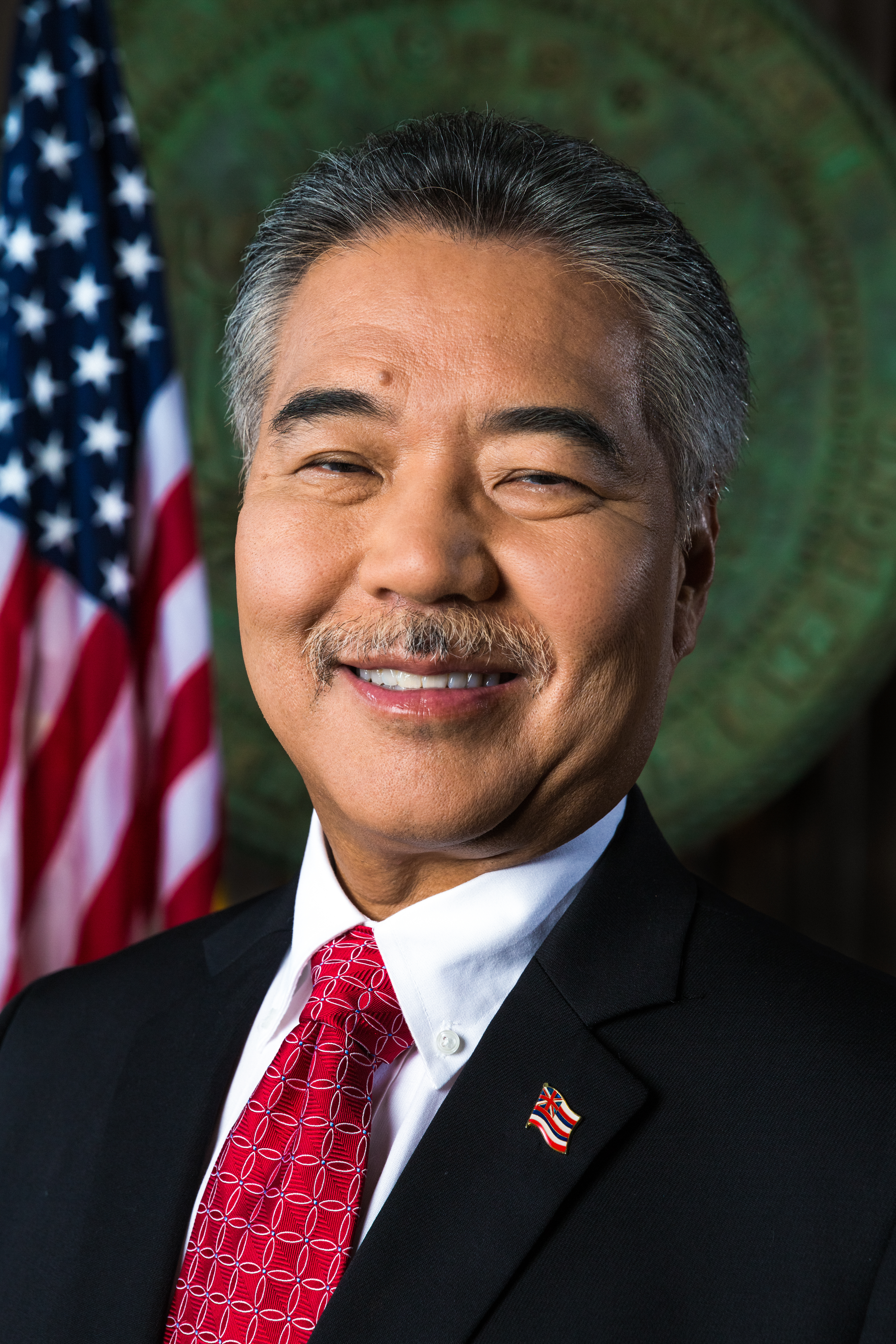
- Official portrait, 2014

8th Governor of Hawaii
- In office December 1, 2014 – December 5, 2022
- Lieutenant: Shan Tsutsui; Doug Chin; Josh Green
- Preceded by: Neil Abercrombie
- Succeeded by: Josh Green

Member of the Hawaii Senate
- In office November 1994 – November 2014
- Preceded by: Eloise Tungpalan
- Succeeded by: Breene Harimoto
- Constituency: 17th district (1994–2002); 16th district (2002–2014)

Member of the Hawaii House of Representatives
- In office December 2, 1985 – November 1994
- Appointed by: George Ariyoshi
- Preceded by: Arnold Morgado
- Succeeded by: Mark Takai
- Constituency: 43rd district (1985–1992); 34th district (1992–1994)

Personal details
- Born: David Yutaka Ige; January 15, 1957 (age 69) Pearl City, Hawaii Territory, U.S.
- Party: Democratic
- Spouse: Dawn Amano (m. 1982)
- Children: 3
- Education: University of Hawaii, Manoa (BS, MBA)
- Website: Campaign website

David Yutaka Ige (/ˈiːɡeɪ/; 伊芸 豊, Ige Yutaka; born January 15, 1957) is an American politician and engineer who served as the eighth governor of Hawaii from 2014 to 2022. A Democrat, he served in the Hawaii State Senate from 1994 to 2014 and the Hawaii House of Representatives from 1985 to 1994.

In the 2014 gubernatorial election, he defeated incumbent Governor Neil Abercrombie in the Democratic primary, and won the general election over Republican nominee Duke Aiona. Ige was reelected in 2018, defeating Republican nominee Andria Tupola.

== Early life and college ==
Ige was born and raised in Pearl City, Hawaii, the fifth of six sons of Tokio and Tsurue Ige, who are of Okinawan descent. During World War II, Tokio served in the 100th Battalion/442nd Infantry Regimental Combat Team and was awarded the Purple Heart and Bronze Star. After the war, Tokio Ige worked as an ironworker on construction projects while Tsurue Ige worked as a nurse and dental hygienist. Tokio (born 1917) died in 2005 at age 86, whilst his wife, Tsurue (born 1923) died in 2021 at age 98.

David Ige attended public schools in Pearl City—Pearl City Elementary School, Highlands Intermediate School, and Pearl City High School—and participated in community sports, playing in the Pearl City Little League for eight years. At the newly built Pearl City High School, Ige excelled in many activities. In his junior year he was elected student body vice president, and he served as senior class president the next year. His campaign for student body president stressed diversity and an end to bullying. Ige also led his varsity tennis team to a championship and was honored as the "Scholar-Athlete of the Year." He graduated fifth in his class of more than 500 students in 1975.

Ige was accepted by the Massachusetts Institute of Technology, but attended the University of Hawaii at Manoa, where he earned a Bachelor of Science degree in electrical engineering. At UH he served as student body secretary and an officer of several honor societies as well as treasurer and vice-president of his fraternity, Phi Delta Sigma.

Ige met his wife, Dawn, at the University of Hawaii. They have three children: Lauren, Amy, and Matthew.

== Engineering career ==
After college, while working for GTE Hawaiian Tel, Ige took graduate courses at UH and earned a Master of Business Administration degree in decisions sciences. In 1986 Hawaii Business Magazine named him one of the university's Top 10 MBA students.

Before being elected governor of Hawaii, Ige served as project manager with Robert A. Ige and Associates, Inc., Vice President of engineering at NetEnterprise, and senior principal engineer at Pihana Pacific, which established the first world-class data center and carrier-neutral Internet exchange in Hawaii and the Pacific. Before that, he worked as an engineer for GTE Hawaiian Tel for more than 18 years.

== Hawaii legislature ==
Ige was originally appointed to the Hawaii House of Representatives on December 2, 1985, by Governor George Ariyoshi after Representative Arnold Morgado resigned to run for a seat on the Honolulu City Council. He served in the Hawaii State Senate from 1995 to 2015. During his legislative career, Ige served as chair of nine different committees. He focused much of his career as a legislator on information and telecommunications policy, and co-authored the Hawaii Telecommunications and Information Industries Act that established the state information network and created the Hawaii Information Network Corporation. Ige was at the center of Hawaii's efforts to diversify its economy. He was responsible for establishing seed capital and venture capital programs, software development initiatives, and technology transfer programs. Ige was a member of the inaugural 1997 class of the Pacific Century Fellows.

=== 2012 reelection campaign ===
Ige was reelected to the Hawaii State Senate in 2012, defeating Republican challenger and former U.S. Naval Air crewman, Army Captain, and small business executive Mike Greco. Greco was the first challenger Ige faced in a general election in over a decade.

== Governor of Hawaii ==
=== 2014 campaign for governor ===
Ige ran against incumbent Neil Abercrombie in the Democratic primary for the 2014 gubernatorial election, after Abercrombie upset the supporters of late US senator Daniel Inouye by ignoring his wish to be replaced by Colleen Hanabusa. Though outspent in the race, Ige defeated Abercrombie, 66% to 31%. Ige's victory made him the first candidate to ever defeat an incumbent governor of Hawaii in a primary election.

Ige faced Republican Duke Aiona and Independent Mufi Hannemann in the general election. He won by 12 percentage points.

=== Inauguration ===
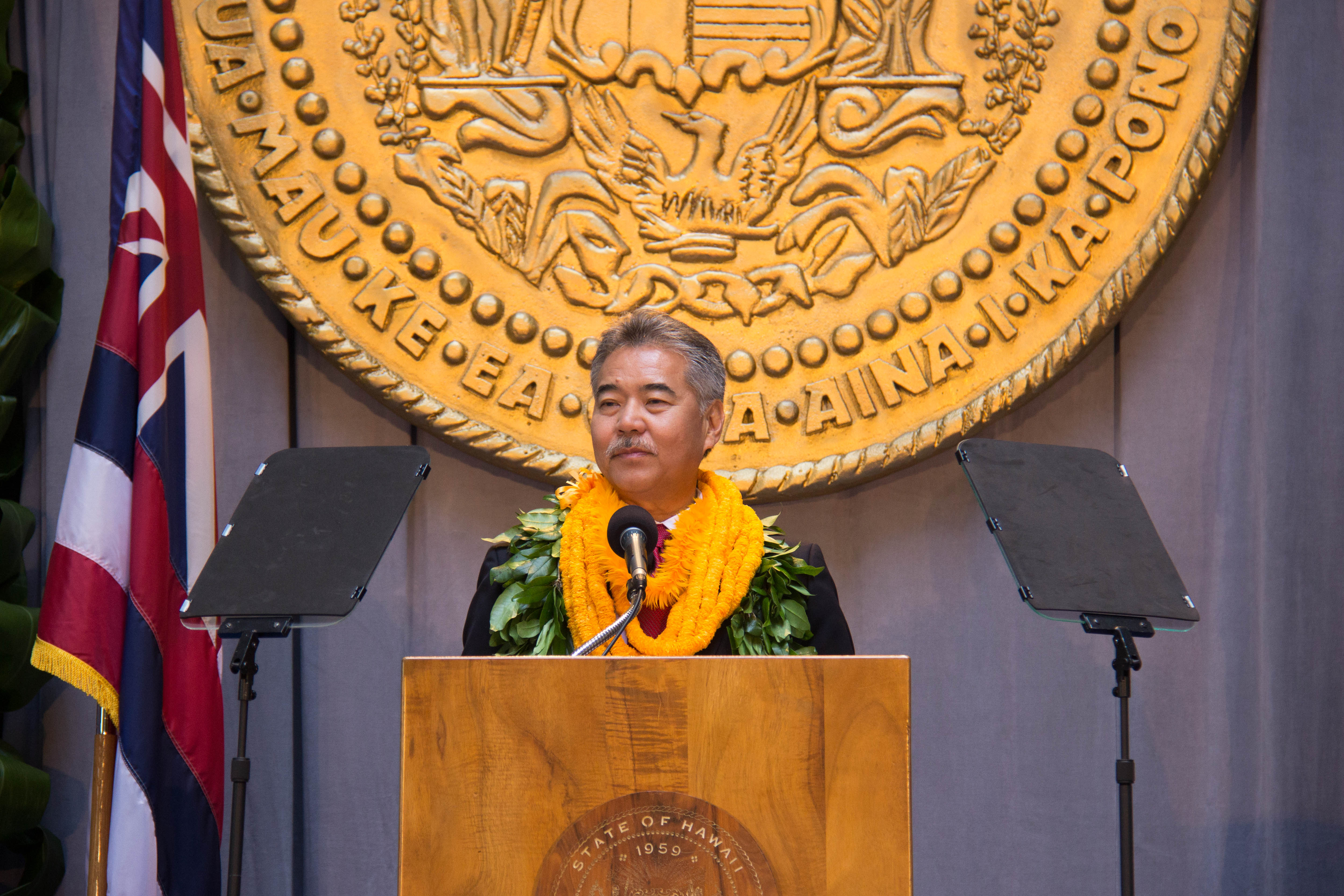
Inauguration of David Ige as 8th Governor of Hawaii

Ige was sworn in as the eighth governor of Hawaii on December 1, 2014, with Lieutenant Governor Shan Tsutsui, in the Hawaii State Capitol Rotunda. Ige is the first person of Okinawan descent to be elected governor of a U.S. state.

Governor Ige's inauguration theme of "honoring the past and charting a new tomorrow" was on display throughout the ceremony, which paid tribute to his father who served in the 100th Battalion, 442nd Regimental Combat Team of the U.S. Army during World War II alongside the late U.S. Senator Daniel Inouye.

=== Gubernatorial tenure ===
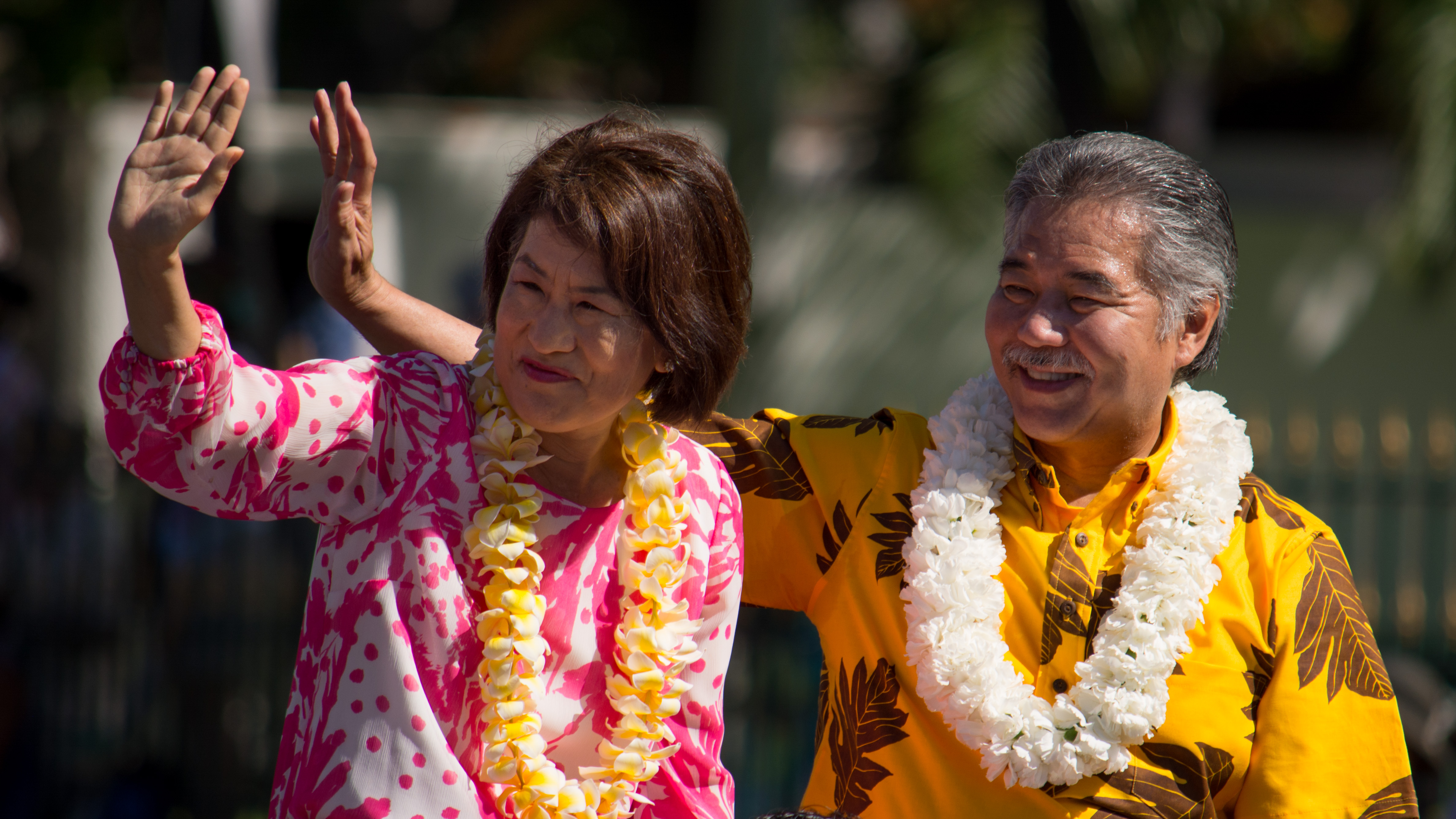
Governor David Ige and First Lady Dawn Ige ride in the Kamehameha Day Parade, 2016

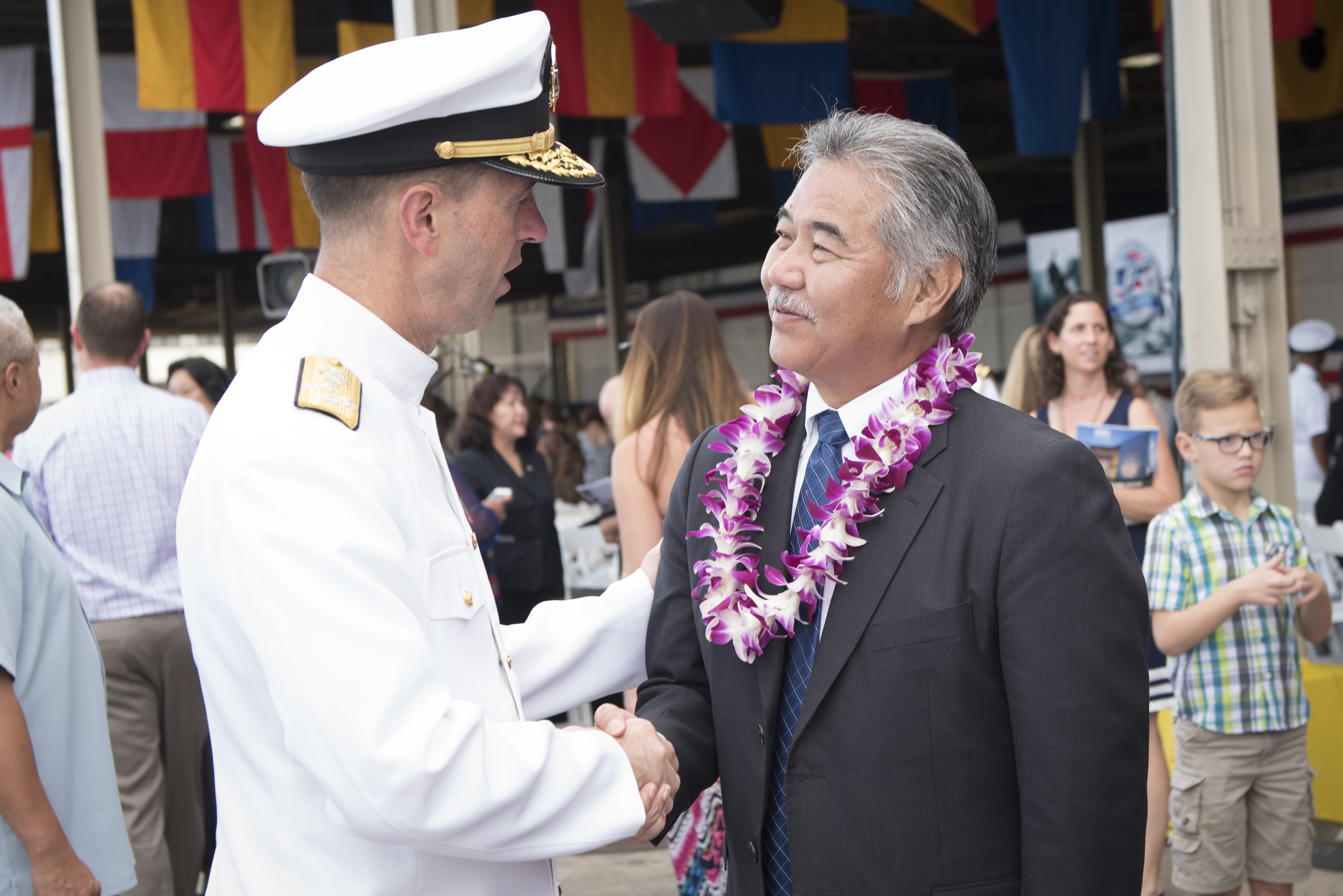
Governor Ige with U.S. Navy admiral John Richardson at the 75th Commemoration Event of the attacks on Pearl Harbor and Oahu, 2016

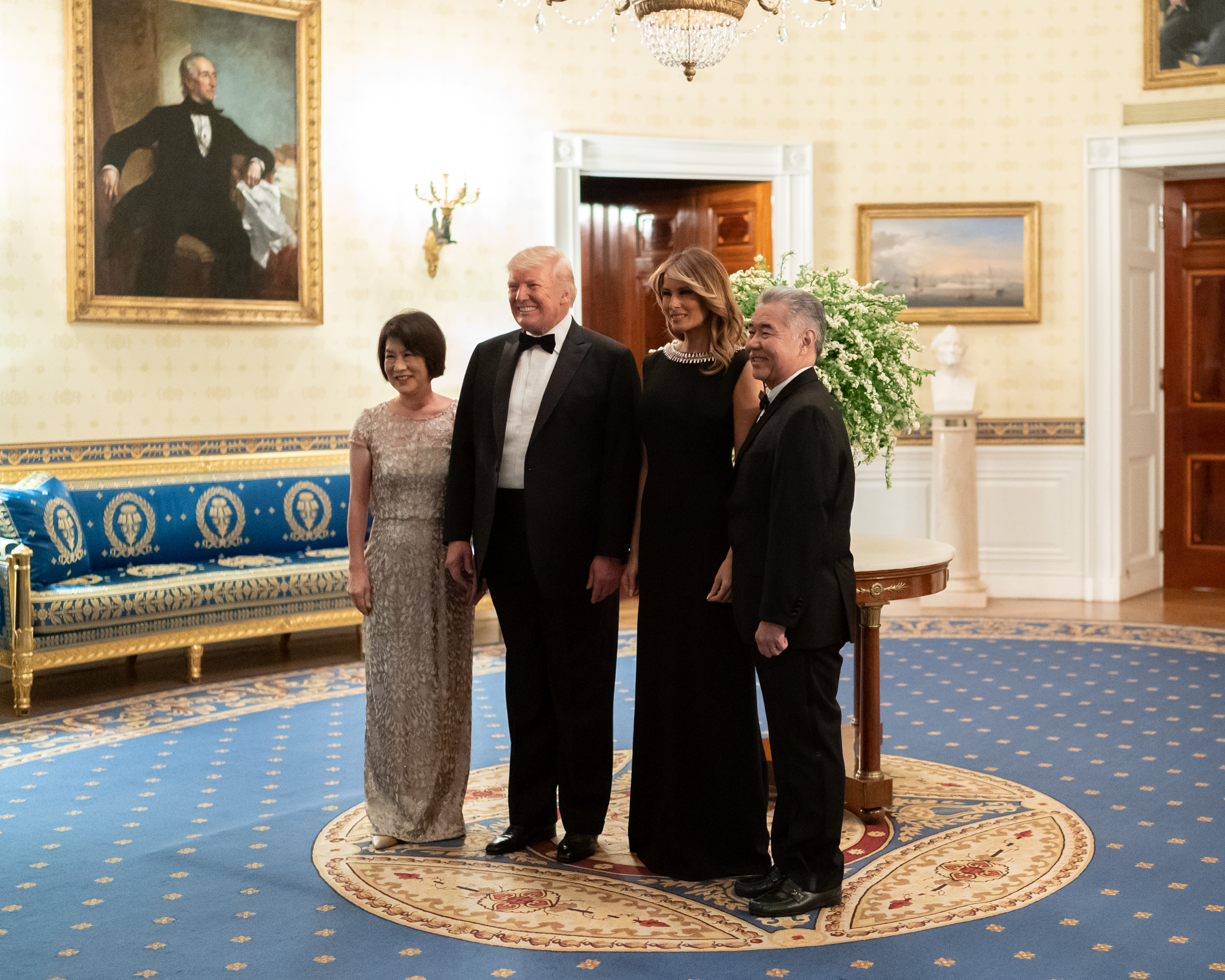
Ige with President Donald Trump and First Lady Melania Trump in 2020

In October 2015, Ige declared a state of emergency due to the escalating scale of the homelessness problem; in 2015, Hawaii had the highest rate of homeless persons per capita in the United States. In June 2017, following President Donald Trump's decision to withdraw the United States from the Paris Agreement on climate change, Ige signed two bills that respectively committed the state to meeting regardless its greenhouse gas emission targets under the Paris Agreement and established a carbon reduction and soil health task force.

After an incoming missile alert was erroneously sent to all smartphones in the state and broadcast over local television and radio on January 13, 2018, Ige apologized for the mistake, which he attributed to human error during a shift change at the Hawaii Emergency Management Agency. He pledged to reevaluate the state's emergency procedures to prevent a recurrence of the false alert, which caused widespread panic and confusion in the state.

On February 22, 2019, President Trump appointed Ige to the bipartisan Council of Governors, on which Ige served as co-chair.

In June 2022, Ige signed a transgender rights bill into law, expanding gender affirming care for Hawaii's residents.

== Electoral history ==
Hawaii House of Representatives 34th district Democratic primary, 1992
Party	Candidate	Votes	%
Democratic	David Ige	2,907	86.31%
Democratic	Gloria "Moana" May	461	13.69%

Hawaii House of Representatives 34th district general election, 1992
Party	Candidate	Votes	%
Democratic	David Ige (incumbent)	5,758	82.55%
Republican	Monte Rae Parker	1,217	17.45%
Democratic hold			

Hawaii State Senate 17th district general election, 1994
Party	Candidate	Votes	%
Democratic	David Ige (incumbent)	11,866	75.49%
Republican	Stef Davis	3,852	24.51%
Democratic hold			

Hawaii State Senate 17th district general election, 1998
Party	Candidate	Votes	%
Democratic	David Ige (incumbent)	13,487	84.11%
Libertarian	Robert Grayson	2,548	15.89%
Democratic hold			

Hawaii State Senate 16th district general election, 2002
Party	Candidate	Votes	%
Democratic	David Ige (incumbent)	N/A	100.00%
Democratic hold			

Hawaii State Senate 16th district general election, 2004
Party	Candidate	Votes	%
Democratic	David Ige (incumbent)	N/A	100.00%
Democratic hold			

Hawaii State Senate 16th district general election, 2008
Party	Candidate	Votes	%
Democratic	David Ige (incumbent)	N/A	100.00%
Democratic hold			

Hawaii State Senate 16th district general election, 2012
Party	Candidate	Votes	%
Republican	Mike Greco	3,705	20.74
Democratic hold			

Hawaii gubernatorial Democratic primary, 2014
Party	Candidate	Votes	%
Democratic	David Ige	157,050	67.35%
Democratic	Neil Abercrombie (incumbent)	73,507	31.52%
Democratic	Van "Tanaban" Tanabe	2,622	1.12%

Hawaii gubernatorial election, 2014
Party	Candidate	Votes	%
Democratic	David Ige & Shan Tsutsui	181,106	49.45%
Republican	Duke Aiona & Elwin Ahu	135,775	37.08%
Independent	Mufi Hannemann & Les Chang	42,934	11.72%
Libertarian	Jeff Davis & Cynthia "Lahi" Marlin	6,395	1.75%
Democratic hold			

Hawaii gubernatorial Democratic primary, 2018
Party	Candidate	Votes	%
Democratic	David Ige (incumbent)	124,528	51.4%
Democratic	Colleen Hanabusa	107,583	44.4%
Democratic	Ernest Caravalho	5,659	2.3%
Democratic	Wendell Ka'ehu'ae'a	2,293	0.9%
Democratic	Richard Kim	1,575	0.6%
Democratic	Van Tanabe	775	0.3%

Hawaii gubernatorial election, 2018
Party	Candidate	Votes	%
Democratic	David Ige & Josh Green (inc.)	244,814	62.7%
Republican	Andria Tupola & Marissa Kerns	131,604	33.7%
Green	Jim Brewer & Renee Ing	10,112	2.6%
Nonpartisan	Terence Teruya & Paul Robotti	4,062	1.0
Democratic hold			

== See also ==
- List of minority governors and lieutenant governors in the United States

Party political offices
Preceded by Neil Abercrombie	Democratic nominee for Governor of Hawaii; 2014, 2018	Succeeded by Josh Green
Political offices
Preceded by Neil Abercrombie	Governor of Hawaii; 2014–2022	Succeeded by Josh Green
U.S. order of precedence (ceremonial)
Preceded by Neil Abercrombie as Former Governor	Order of precedence of the United States; Within Hawaii	Succeeded by Jack Markell as Former Governor
Preceded by Neil Abercrombie as Former Governor	Order of precedence of the United States; Outside Hawaii	Succeeded by Newt Gingrich as Former Speaker of the U.S. House of Representatives
