= Paul Whalen =

American politician

Member of the Hawaii Senate from the 3rd district
- In office 2002–2008
- Succeeded by: Josh Green

Member of the Hawaii House of Representatives from the 5th district
- In office 1996–2002
- Preceded by: Virginia Isbell

Personal details
- Born: 1962 or 1963 (age 63–64)
- Party: Republican
- Profession: Attorney

Paul C. Whalen (born c. 1962–1963) is an American attorney and former Republican politician who represented West Hawaii Island in the Hawaii House of Representatives from 1996 to 2002 and in the Hawaii Senate from 2002 to 2008. By the end of his tenure he was the only Republican in the Hawaii State Legislature from the Neighbor Islands.

== Early life and career ==
Whalen moved to Hawaii in 1973, initially working as a teacher and overseas aid worker before becoming a lawyer and serving as a deputy prosecutor. He married Stephanie Young in 1988. He graduated from the University of Hawaii Law School. He was a member of the 1998 class of the Pacific Century Fellows.

== Hawaii House of Representatives ==
Whalen first ran for election in 1994, challenging Democrat Virginia Isbell for a seat representing the 5th House District in the Hawaii House of Representatives. He lost the election with 46 percent of the vote, but the Hawaii Tribune-Herald described the race as being "the only close race involving an incumbent on the Big Island." In 1996, Whalen was elected to the Hawaii House of Representatives for the 5th House District after Isbell opted to run for Mayor of Hawaiʻi County. His election marked the end of a two-year period with no elected Republicans from the Big Island. In 2000, Isbell challenged him for the seat again. Whalen served in the House until 2002, when he ran for election to the Hawaii Senate.

== Hawaii Senate ==
Whalen was elected to the Hawaii Senate in 2002 for the 3rd Senate district and was re-elected in 2004. He served as minority floor leader during the 2007 session and had his name floated by Senators Sam Slom and Gordon Trimble to replace Fred Hemmings as minority leader, but declined the position. Also in 2007, then-state representative Josh Green announced that he would be challenging Whalen, with Green criticizing Whalen for missing committee hearings and floor sessions. Whalen had missed 26% of votes in 2006 and over 50% of votes in 2006. Around this time, Whalen considered leaving the Senate to direct the state Office of Planning, but was not ultimately selected for the role.

== Retirement ==
On February 29, 2008, Whalen announced on the Senate floor that he would not seek re-election. He said that his decision to retire was unconnected to the primary challenge by Green. No Republican ultimately filed for the seat and Green was elected after defeating Virginia Isbell in the Democratic primary on September 20, 2008.
