= Gas Cap Law =

The Hawaii Gas Cap Law is a state law introduced in 2005 setting a price ceiling on wholesale gasoline prices, the maximum amount that may be charged for producing gasoline and delivering it to a service station. Under the law, the gas cap was set weekly by the Hawaii Public Utilities Commission (PUC) based on average spot prices for regular unleaded gasoline in three U.S. markets, New York Harbor, the Gulf Coast, and Los Angeles.

The gas cap had a baseline price that is the same throughout Hawaii, but the total wholesale price varied depending on seven zones, reflecting the differing costs of delivery to various locations throughout the state.

- (Zone 1) Oahu
- (Zone 2) Kauai
- (Zone 3) Maui
- (Zone 4) Hana
- (Zone 5) Molokai
- (Zone 6) Lanai
- (Zone 7) Hilo
- (Zone 8) Kona

== Law suspended ==
On May 5, 2006, Gov. Linda Lingle (in office, 2002–2010) signed a bill suspending the gas cap law. The bill allows Hawaii's governor to reinstate the gas cap law at any time.

Having been in force for less than a year, the cap was seen by some as artificially raising prices for consumers in Hawaii. As of 2019, the law has not been reinstated.
