= Terrance W. H. Tom =

American politician

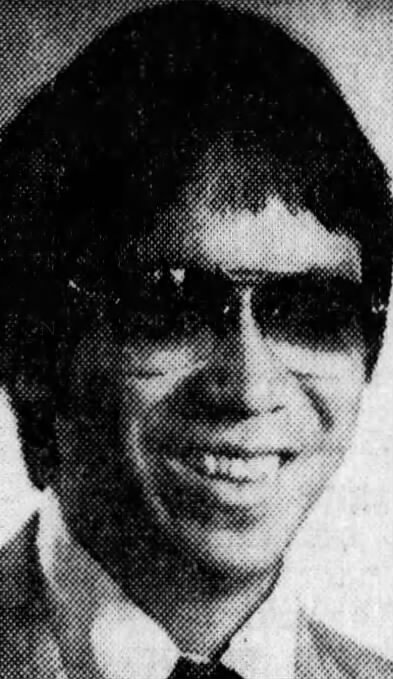
- Tom in 1982

Member of the Hawaii House of Representatives
- In office 1982–1998

Personal details
- Party: Democratic
- Education: University of Hawaiʻi; University of San Francisco School of Law

Terrance W. H. Tom is an American politician. He served as a Democratic member of the Hawaii House of Representatives.

== Life and career ==
Tom is blind. He attended McKinley High School, the University of Hawaiʻi and the University of San Francisco School of Law.

In 1982, Tom was elected to the Hawaii House of Representatives, serving until 1998.
