= 1959 Hawaii gubernatorial election =

- July 28, 1959
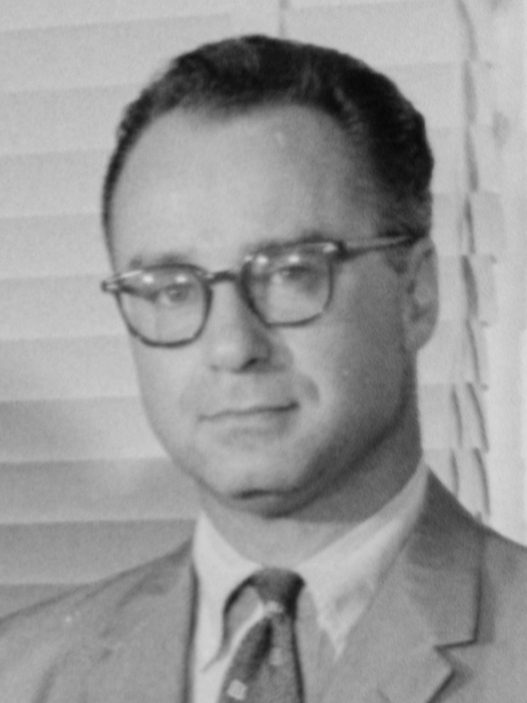

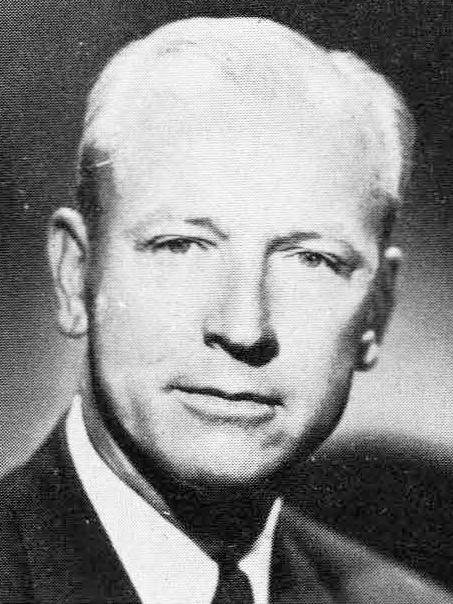
Nominee	William F. Quinn	John A. Burns
Party	Republican	Democratic
Running mate	James Kealoha	Mitsuyuki Kido
Popular vote	86,213	82,074
Percentage	51.12%	48.66%
- Quinn: 50–60% Burns: 50–60%
Elected Governor
William F. Quinn
Republican

The 1959 Hawaii gubernatorial election was Hawaii's first gubernatorial election. The election was held on July 28, 1959, one month after Hawaiians had voted for statehood in accordance with the Hawaii Admission Act and one month before admission as the 50th state on August 21, 1959.

In the election, the Republican candidate, Territorial Governor William F. Quinn, defeated the Democratic candidate, Territorial Delegate John A. Burns. Quinn won only the island of Oahu while Burns carried all other islands. This was the last time until 2002 that a Republican was elected governor of Hawaii.

== General election ==
=== Results ===
Hawaii gubernatorial election, 1959
Party	Candidate	Votes	%	±%
Republican	William F. Quinn	86,213	51.12	
Democratic	John A. Burns	82,074	48.66	
Commonwealth	David Kihei	375	0.22	
Majority		4,139	2.45	
Turnout		168,662		
Republican hold				

== See also ==
- 1959 United States Senate elections in Hawaii
- 1959 United States House of Representatives election in Hawaii
- 1959 Hawaii Senate election
