= William F. Quinn =

Governor of Hawaii from 1957 to 1962

William Quinn OESSH
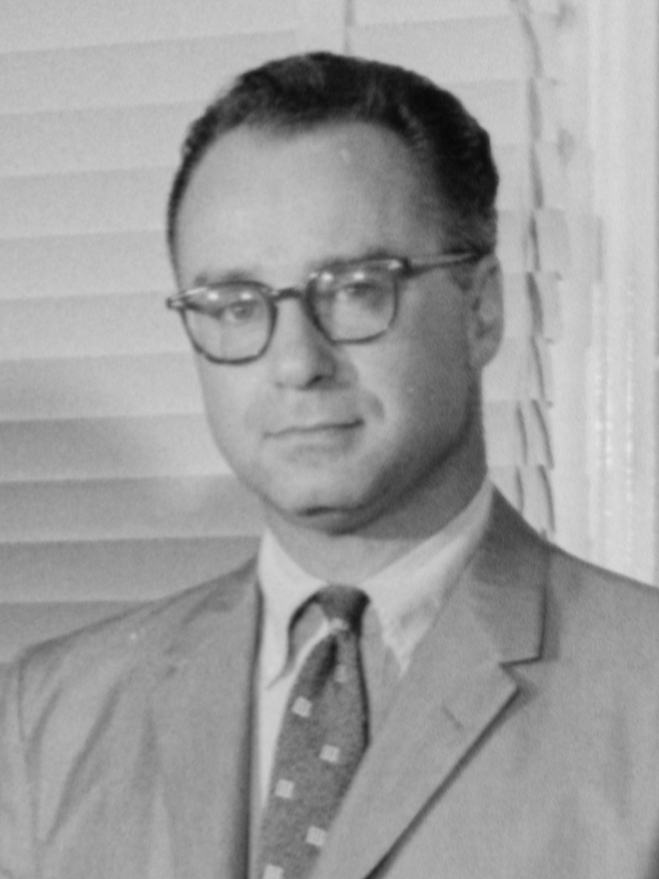
- Quinn in 1958

1st Governor of Hawaii
- In office August 21, 1959 – December 3, 1962
- Lieutenant: James Kealoha
- Preceded by: position established (himself as territorial governor)
- Succeeded by: John A. Burns

12th Territorial Governor of Hawaii
- In office August 29, 1957 – August 21, 1959
- Appointed by: Dwight D. Eisenhower
- Preceded by: Samuel Wilder King
- Succeeded by: position abolished (himself as governor)

Personal details
- Born: William Francis Quinn; July 13, 1919 Rochester, New York, U.S.
- Died: August 28, 2006 (aged 87) Honolulu, Hawaii, U.S.
- Resting place: National Cemetery of the Pacific
- Party: Republican
- Spouse: Nancy Witbeck (m. 1942)
- Children: 7
- Education: Saint Louis University (BA); Harvard University (LLB)

Military service
- Allegiance: United States
- Branch/service: United States Navy
- Unit: Naval Intelligence
- Battles/wars: World War II

William Francis Quinn OESSH (July 13, 1919 – August 28, 2006) was an American lawyer and politician. He served as the 12th and last governor of the Territory of Hawaii from 1957 to 1959 and the first governor of the State of Hawaii from 1959 to 1962. Originally appointed to the office by President Dwight D. Eisenhower, Quinn was the last executive appointed by an American president, after American rule of the Hawaiian Islands began after the overthrow of the monarchy in 1893. He was also the last Republican to serve as governor until Linda Lingle in 2002. Quinn appeared as a guest on the television program What's My Line. He was the recipient of the Order of the Holy Sepulchre, a papal knighthood conferred by Pope John Paul II. He was the state's first Republican governor.

== Early years ==
Quinn was born in Rochester, New York on July 13, 1919. His family moved to St. Louis, Missouri during his youth, where he attended prep school at St. Louis University High School and college at Saint Louis University, graduating in 1940. Quinn entered Harvard Law School, but only finished after his stint in the military. He graduated cum laude in 1947. He served in Hawaii in naval intelligence during World War II. Upon his discharge from service, he settled permanently in Honolulu, Hawai'i.

== Law and political career ==
In 1949, in a deal involving homestead development of the area of Waimea in Hawaii County, as a lawyer with Parker Ranch attorney Garner Anthony, Quinn brokered a deal with the Territorial Land Office and Hawaiian Homes Commission to allow the ranch a more lengthy period of time in which to evacuate the property.

Quinn involved himself in territorial politics and ran for the Hawaii Territorial Senate in 1956.

Quinn worked closely with Congressional Delegate John A. Burns on the Hawaii Statehood Commission. President Dwight D. Eisenhower appointed Quinn Governor of the Territory of Hawaii in 1957. In 1959, he defeated Burns to win the new state's first gubernatorial election. In 1961, Quinn was grand marshal of the Tournament of Roses Parade in Pasadena, California. During the 1962 gubernatorial election, Quinn faced Burns in a rematch; he also faced a strong primary challenge from Lieutenant Governor James Kealoha, and Burns ultimately won the election.

In 1976, Quinn ran for the United States Senate, an election he lost to Spark Matsunaga.

== Later years and personal life ==
On July 11, 1942, Quinn married Nancy Ellen Witbeck; the couple had seven children. They were members of the Portlock Road Association.

He was president of Dole Pineapple Company from 1965 to 1972, and chairman of the board of both the Honolulu Symphony and the East-West Center.

Quinn lectured, occasionally traveled on the public speaking circuit serving as a Republican elder statesman, and spent time with his family in Hawai'i. A devout Catholic, he was the recipient of a papal knighthood in the Order of the Holy Sepulchre.

He was a dedicated actor and singer in the Honolulu Light Opera. His most notable role was in the 1940s production of Brigadoon.

In March 2006, Quinn was injured in a fall and never fully recovered. He died on August 28, 2006, and is buried at National Memorial Cemetery of the Pacific.

Political offices
Preceded by Samuel Wilder King	Governor of Hawaii; 1957–1962	Succeeded by John A. Burns
Party political offices
First	Republican nominee for Governor of Hawaii; 1959, 1962	Succeeded by Randolph Crossley
Preceded by Hiram Fong	Republican nominee for U.S. senator from Hawaii (Class 1); 1976	Succeeded by Clarence Brown
