= Josh Green (politician) =

Governor of Hawaii since 2022

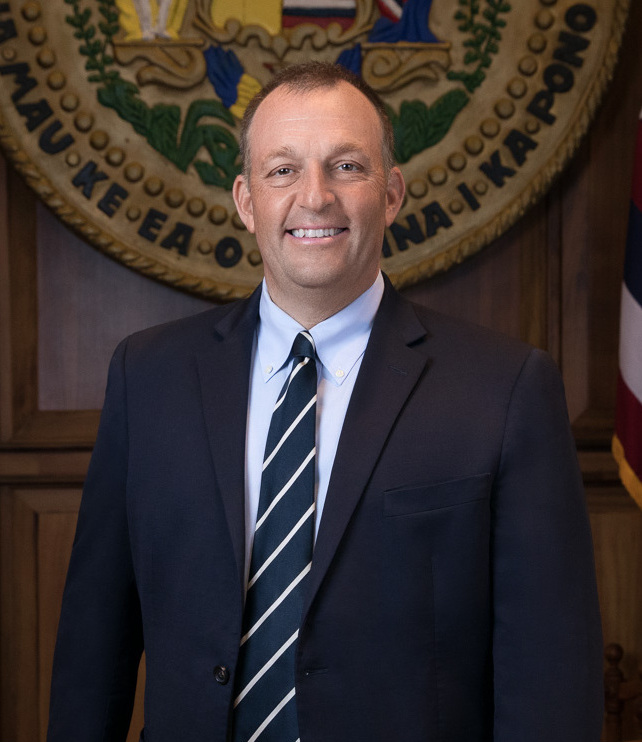
- Official portrait, 2022

9th Governor of Hawaii
- Incumbent
- Assumed office December 5, 2022
- Lieutenant: Sylvia Luke; Keith Regan (acting); Derek Kawakami (elect)
- Preceded by: David Ige

15th Lieutenant Governor of Hawaii
- In office December 3, 2018 – December 5, 2022
- Governor: David Ige
- Preceded by: Doug Chin
- Succeeded by: Sylvia Luke

Member of the Hawaii Senate from the 3rd district
- In office November 4, 2008 – November 6, 2018
- Preceded by: Paul Whalen
- Succeeded by: Dru Kanuha

Member of the Hawaii House of Representatives from the 6th district
- In office November 2, 2004 – November 4, 2008
- Preceded by: Mark Jernigan
- Succeeded by: Denny Coffman

Personal details
- Born: Joshua Booth Green; February 11, 1970 (age 56) Kingston, New York, U.S.
- Party: Democratic
- Spouse: Jaime Ushiroda (m. 2006)
- Children: 2
- Education: Swarthmore College (BS); Pennsylvania State University (MD)
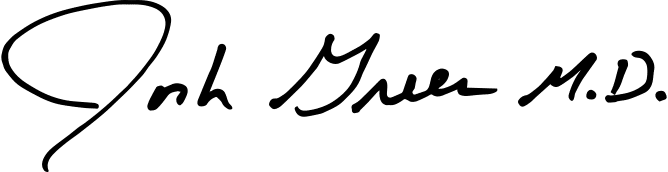
- Signature
- Website: Office website Campaign website
- Green's voice Green on addressing homelessness in Hawaii through affordable housing development. Recorded January 15, 2019

Joshua Booth Green (born February 11, 1970) is an American politician and physician serving since 2022 as the ninth governor of Hawaii. A member of the Democratic Party, he served from 2018 to 2022 as the 15th lieutenant governor of Hawaii. From 2004 to 2018, he was a member of the Hawaii State Legislature.

== Early life and education ==
Green was born on February 11, 1970, in Kingston, New York, to a Jewish family. He was raised in Pittsburgh, Pennsylvania. He attended Quaker Valley High School, where he graduated as one of four valedictorians in 1988; as a Quaker Valley student, he was president of the Key Club and played on the school's soccer and tennis teams.

Green received a Bachelor of Science in anthropology from Swarthmore College in 1992 and his Doctor of Medicine from the Penn State Milton S. Hershey Medical Center at Pennsylvania State University in 1997. He completed a residency in family medicine at UPMC Shadyside in 2000. In 2022, Swarthmore College awarded Green an honorary Doctorate of Science.

== Medical career ==
After completing his residency in 2000, Green joined the National Health Service Corps and was stationed in Hawaii as a physician for the Big Island. He practiced family medicine and worked in emergency rooms. At times, he was the only physician in the island's rural areas. As of 2012, he remained a physician in the Big Island's rural emergency departments on weekends while he was a state senator.

Green has been awarded Physician of the Year by the Hawaiʻi Medical Association twice in his career, first in 2009, and again in 2022 for his leadership and service during the COVID-19 pandemic.

== Early political career ==
=== Hawaii House of Representatives ===
Green was elected to the Hawaii House of Representatives in 2004. He represented the 6th district, based in a rural area of the western portion of the Big Island. Green served two terms before being elected to the Hawaii Senate in 2008.

=== Hawaii Senate ===
Green was first elected to the Hawaii Senate in 2008. He represented the 3rd district, which encompassed the southwestern portion of the Big Island. He was reelected in 2012 and 2014. As a state senator, Green served as majority leader and chaired the Committee on Health and Human Services.

In 2013, Green was honored as "Hawaii Legislator of the Year". He backed the initiative to create an insurance mandate for children with autism via legislation known as Luke's Law. The legislation went into effect on January 1, 2016.

Five years later, Green attempted to establish a legal safeguard so that parents with disabilities would no longer have their children taken away from them because of their disabilities. He also led the charge to raise the legal age to obtain tobacco products and electronic cigarettes from 18 to 21, making Hawaii the first U.S. state to do so.

Green opted not to run for reelection to the Senate in 2018. He was succeeded by Dru Kanuha.

=== Lieutenant Governor of Hawaii ===
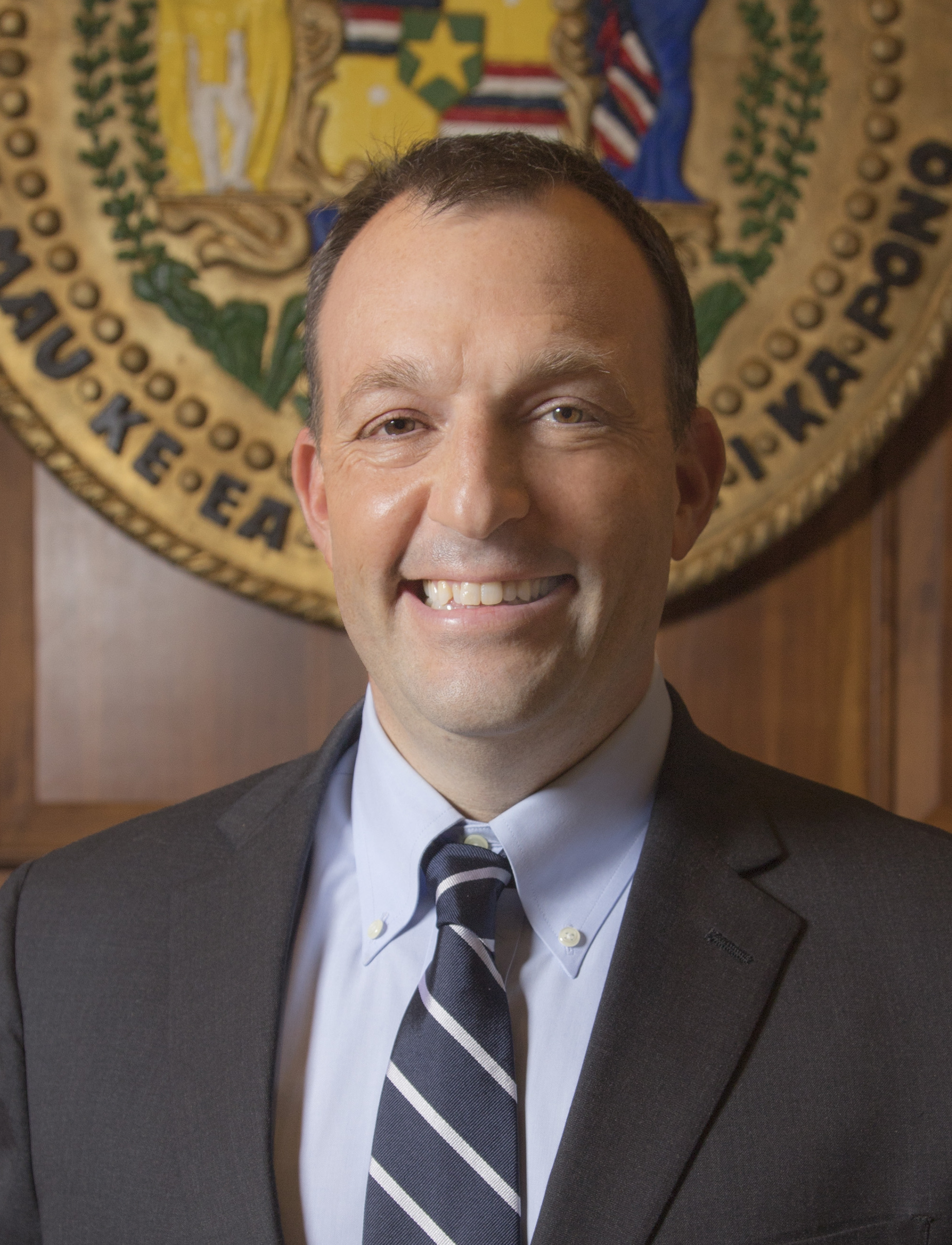
Green's official portrait as Hawaii Lieutenant Governor

In 2018, Green won the Democratic primary for lieutenant governor of Hawaii and was the running mate of incumbent Democratic Governor David Ige, who was running for a second term. In Hawaii, gubernatorial and lieutenant gubernatorial candidates run in separate primaries but on the same ticket in the general election. Ige and Green won the general election on November 6, 2018.

Ige tasked Green with addressing Hawaii's chronic homelessness crisis and called on him to use his background as a physician to address how mental illness and addiction affect Hawaii's homeless population.

In 2019, shortly before the COVID-19 pandemic, Green led a team of over 75 doctors, nurses and other Hawaii health care workers on an emergency medical mission to Samoa. They aided in vaccination efforts against a measles epidemic across the region.

On March 3, 2020, Ige appointed Green as the administration's liaison between the state and healthcare community as it pertains to COVID-19 preparedness and response.

A poll conducted in April 2021 by Hawaii News Now found that Green had a 63% approval rating, with only 17% of voters disapproving of his work as lieutenant governor, while Ige held an approval rating of 22%. It is speculated that Green's visibility throughout the COVID-19 pandemic and background as an emergency room doctor contributed to the difference.

== Governor of Hawaii ==
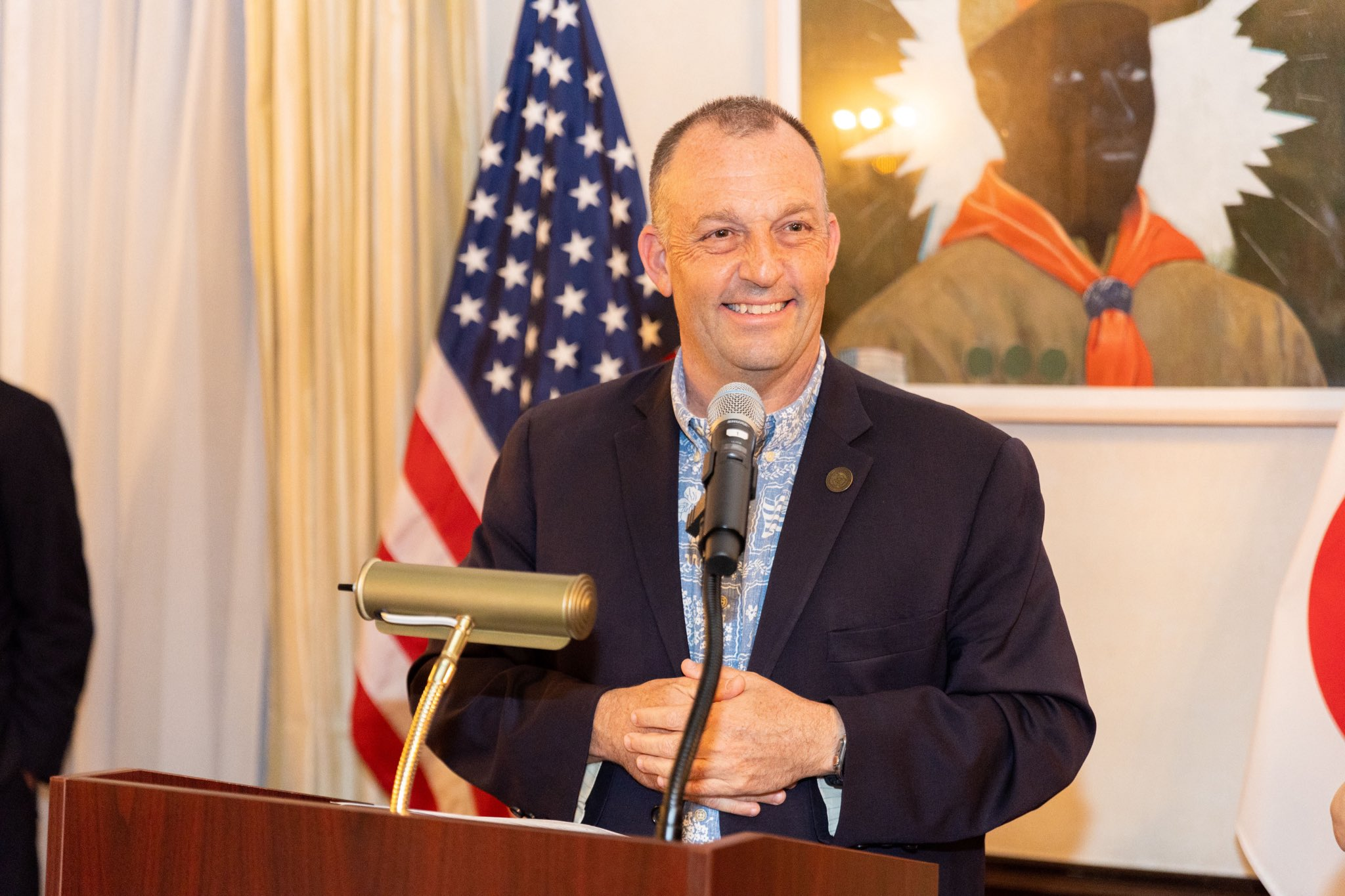
Green in Tokyo Japan 2024.

=== 2022 gubernatorial campaign ===
In August 2019, Green announced he was considering a run for governor of Hawaii in the 2022 election. He launched his campaign on February 10, 2022.

Green won the Democratic primary on August 13, 2022; his running mate was Democratic state representative Sylvia Luke. On November 8, 2022, Green won the general election, defeating Republican nominee and former Hawaii Lieutenant Governor Duke Aiona in the general election. He is Hawaii's first governor born after Hawaii became a state in 1959.

=== Tenure ===
Green was inaugurated as the ninth Governor of Hawaii on December 5, 2022, succeeding David Ige. In his inaugural address, Green emphasized unity and addressed Hawaii's rising cost of living, pledging to combat it through affordable housing initiatives and tax reforms. He said, "When we come together, we can meet any challenge, and accomplish anything we set our minds to", highlighting values of ‘ohana and aloha.

==== 2023: early legislative actions ====
On March 22, 2023, Green signed legislation expanding access to abortion and protecting healthcare providers from out-of-state prosecution. The laws allowed minors to obtain abortions without parental consent in certain cases and repealed hospital requirements for procedures, aligning with national shifts following the U.S. Supreme Court's Dobbs v. Jackson Women's Health Organization decision. On June 2, coinciding with National Gun Violence Awareness Day, Green signed two firearms bills in response to the Supreme Court's New York State Rifle & Pistol Association, Inc. v. Bruen ruling. Act 52 (SB1230) expanded concealed carry rights but prohibited firearms in sensitive locations such as hospitals, beaches, and theaters, strengthening Hawaii's strict gun laws. Act 53 (HB1239) mandated active shooter training in schools. These measures followed similar laws in New York and New Jersey. On July 17, Green issued an emergency proclamation addressing Hawaii's housing crisis, citing high costs and outmigration. The order aimed to streamline construction of 50,000 housing units by suspending state and local land use regulations. The move faced legal challenges for potential environmental and cultural impacts but was praised for its ambition.

==== 2024: comprehensive legislative agenda ====
In the 2024 legislative session, Green signed 253 bills, addressing healthcare, education, culture, and economic issues. On June 3, he enacted Senate Bill 1035, exempting medical services under Medicare, Medicaid, and Tricare from Hawaii's General Excise Tax to reduce healthcare costs and support providers. On June 26, he signed 22 healthcare bills, including SB 3139, which expanded mental health crisis intervention, strengthened the healthcare workforce, and promoted Native Hawaiian resources. Green advanced Hawaiian language education by signing bills to enhance access in early education and universities. On June 28, Senate Bill 2659 mandated sustainable tourism strategies incorporating Native Hawaiian cultural values, aligning with regenerative tourism goals. Additional legislation addressed child and elderly safety, local agriculture, veteran support, and commercial ocean activities. On July 3 and 5, Green signed 11 agriculture bills for biosecurity and fair labeling and 16 bills for fire safety, emergency management, and veteran services.

==== Natural gas imports ====
Despite the state's mandate for 100% renewable electricity by 2045, Green has proposed building a liquefied natural gas import facility in Oahu with Japanese power company JERA. The proposal was backed by an initial report that inflated the benefits of LNG while omitting the cost of natural gas itself, which has increased in the wake of the 2026 Iran war fuel crisis. JERA's estimates for household savings assume the facility operates into the 2070s.

==== Kauhale initiative ====
The kauhale initiative is Green's signature program to address homelessness. It was inspired by a 2018 trip to Austin, Texas, where Green learned about "Community First!", a project to house people in a village of tiny homes. In Hawaiian, "kauhale" means a group of houses, a small settlement, or hamlet.

Green worked on the initiative with Homeaid, a national nonprofit housing organization, opening the first kauhale in Kalaeloa. Using a state emergency proclamation on homelessness, Green bypassed procurement laws to hire HomeAid Hawaii using a sole source, no-bid contract to execute the program.

Green has touted the initiative for having created nearly 900 beds and helping 2,900 previously homeless people find stable housing. According to his office, from 2024 to 2026, the homelessness point-in-time count fell from 4,042 to 3,513, with a 20% reduction on Oahu. The initiative has been criticized for not doing enough to transition people to permanent housing on Oahu's West Side. In 2025, John Mizuno, the director of the homelessness office, stepped down after publicly criticizing the kauhale program's high operating costs, including monthly state payments of $21,000 to provide electricity for a village of 20 tiny homes.

In October 2026, a major audit by Hawaii State Auditor Les Kondo highlighted over $13.7 million in spending that was "unauthorized, unsupported, or questionable". Projects were started before contracts were signed, leading to lack of project oversight, increased liability, and no evaluation of cost information, and the state agency "could not demonstrate that work was properly authorized, projects were completed as agreed, or the State received everything for which it paid". Since the report, the state has sought to recover at least $486,000 from HomeAid, including "$16,000 in unauthorized travel expenses and first-class air tickets, $300,000 in office and administrative expenses and $170,000 paid to HomeAid contractors that wasn't related to the kauhale initiative".

=== 2026 gubernatorial campaign ===
Green ran for reelection and won the Democratic primary on August 8. He and his running mate, Derek Kawakami, won the general election on November 3, defeating the Republican nominees, Gary Cordery and Daniel Anthony.

=== Potential 2028 presidential campaign ===
During a 2025 meeting of the National Governors Association, Green told NBC News that he was considering running for president in 2028.

== Personal life ==
Green is Jewish. He married Jaime Ushiroda in 2006. The couple met when Ushiroda, a family law expert, was clerking for Suzanne Chun Oakland, who was chair of the state's Human Services committee. They have two children.

Green is a fan of the Pittsburgh Steelers.

== Electoral history ==
=== 2018 ===
2018 Hawaii lieutenant gubernatorial election Democratic primary results
Party	Candidate	Votes	%
Democratic	Josh Green	74,845	31.4
Democratic	Jill Tokuda	68,124	28.6
Democratic	Bernard Carvalho	45,825	19.2
Democratic	Kim Coco Iwamoto	34,243	14.3
Democratic	Will Espero	15,463	6.5
Total votes		238,500	100.0

=== 2022 ===
2022 Hawaii gubernatorial election Democratic primary results
Party	Candidate	Votes	%
Democratic	Josh Green	158,161	62.91%
Democratic	Vicky Cayetano	52,447	20.86%
Democratic	Kai Kahele	37,738	15.01%
Democratic	Van Tanabe	1,236	0.49%
Democratic	Richard Kim	991	0.39%
Democratic	David Bourgoin	590	0.23%
Democratic	Clyde Lewman	249	0.10%
Total votes		251,412	100.0%

2022 Hawaii gubernatorial election
Party	Candidate	Votes	%	±%
Democratic	Josh Green; Sylvia Luke	261,025	63.16%	+0.49%
Republican	Duke Aiona; Seaula Tupa'i Jr.	152,237	36.84%	+3.14%
Total votes		413,262	100.0%	
Turnout		417,215	48.44%	–4.24
Registered electors		861,358		
Democratic hold				

Party political offices
Preceded by Shan Tsutsui	Democratic nominee for Lieutenant Governor of Hawaii; 2018	Succeeded by Sylvia Luke
Preceded by David Ige	Democratic nominee for Governor of Hawaii; 2022, 2026	Most recent
Political offices
Preceded by Doug Chin	Lieutenant Governor of Hawaii; 2018–2022	Succeeded by Sylvia Luke
Preceded by David Ige	Governor of Hawaii; 2022–present	Incumbent
U.S. order of precedence (ceremonial)
Preceded by JD Vance as Vice President	Order of precedence of the United States; Within Hawaii	Succeeded by Mayor of city in which event is held
Preceded by JD Vance as Vice President	Order of precedence of the United States; Within Hawaii	Succeeded by Otherwise Mike Johnson as Speaker of the House
Preceded by Mike Dunleavy as Governor of Alaska	Order of precedence of the United States; Outside Hawaii	Succeeded by Steve Scalise as House Majority Leader
