= Washington Place =

Palace in Honolulu, Hawaii

- U.S. National Register of Historic Places
- U.S. National Historic Landmark
- U.S. Historic district – Contributing property
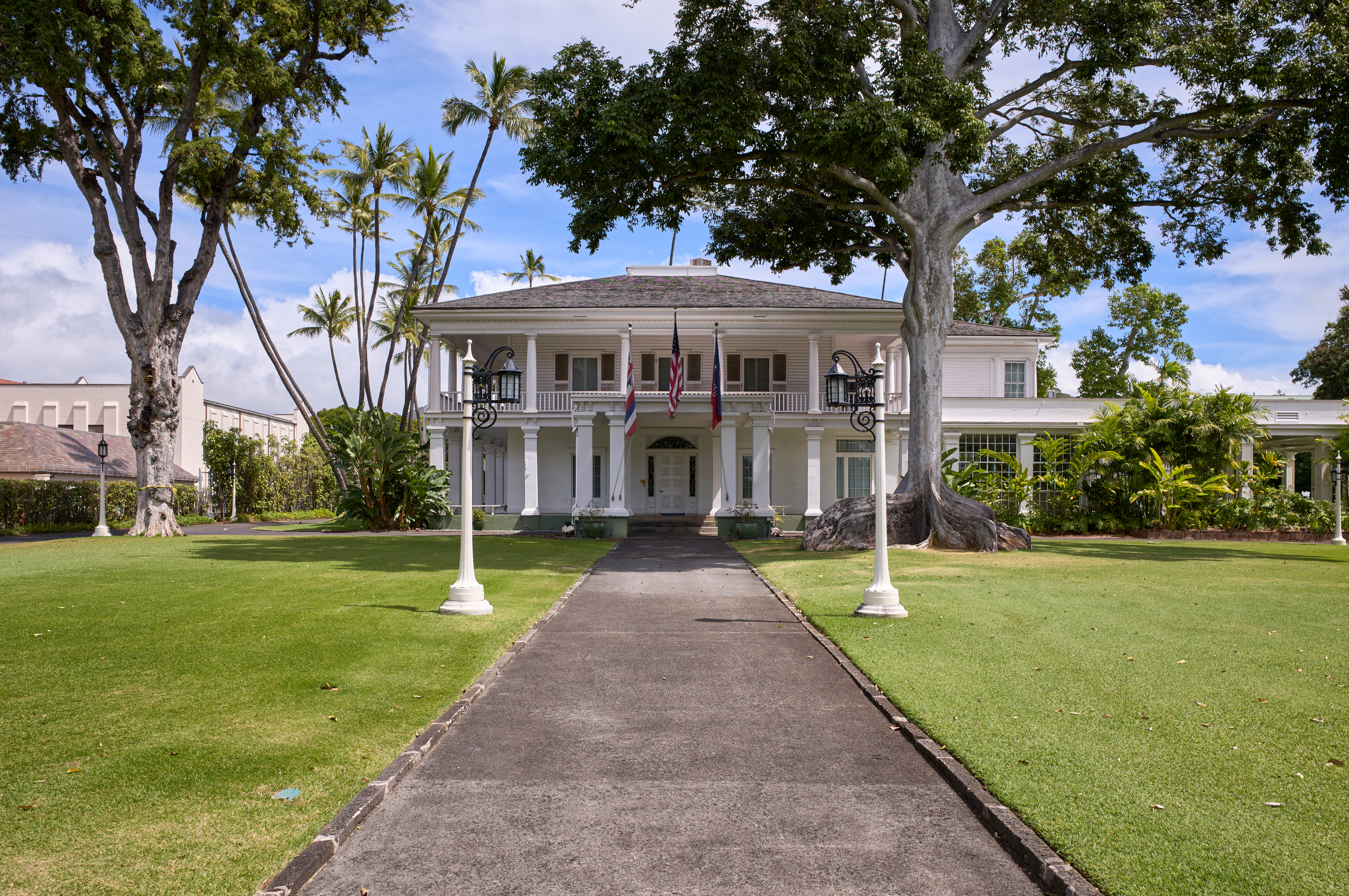
- The building in 2024

- Location within Honolulu Location within Oahu Location within Hawaii
- Location: 320 Beretania Street, Honolulu, Hawaii
- Coordinates: 21°18′31.74″N 157°51′24.36″W
- Area: 3.1 acres (1.3 ha)
- Built: 1847
- Built by: Isaac Hart
- Architectural style: Greek Revival
- Part of: Hawaii Capital Historic District (ID78001020)
- NRHP reference No.: 73000666

Significant dates
- Added to NRHP: June 18, 1973
- Designated NHL: March 29, 2007
- Designated CP: December 1, 1978

Washington Place is a Greek Revival palace in the Hawaii Capital Historic District in Honolulu, Hawaii. It was where Queen Liliʻuokalani was arrested during the overthrow of the Hawaiian Kingdom. Later it became the official residence of the governor of Hawaii. In 2007, it was designated as a National Historic Landmark. The current governor's residence was built in 2008 behind the historic residence and is located on the same grounds as Washington Place.

== Construction ==
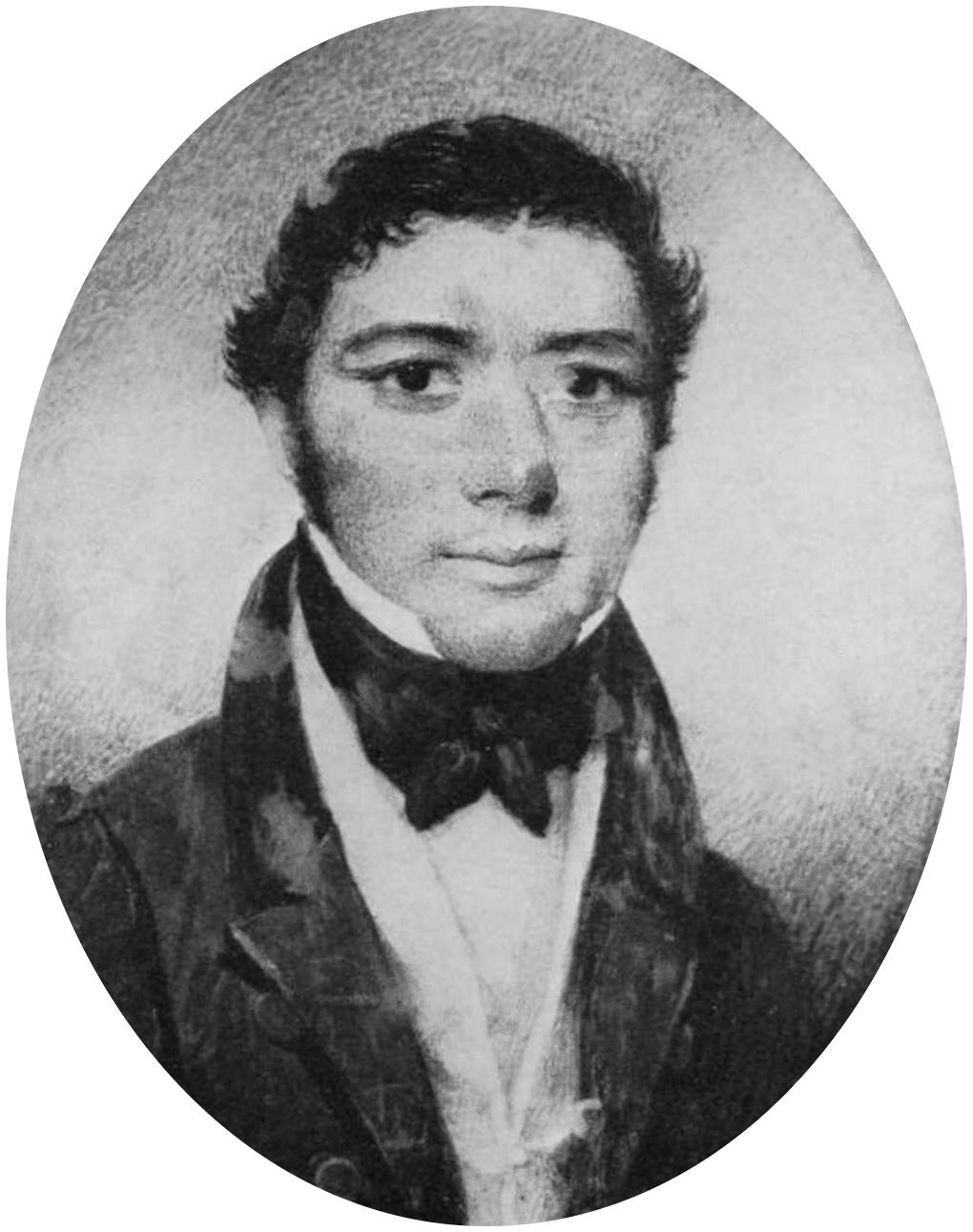
Captain John Dominis (1796–1846)

An American merchant sea captain, John Dominis (1796–1846) came to America in 1819 from Trieste, probably from a Croatian family. After making a number of voyages across the Pacific, he relocated to the Hawaiian Islands in 1837 with his Bostonian wife Mary Jones Dominis (1803–1889) and son John Owen Dominis (1832–1891) from New York. The captain was awarded some land in 1842 as settlement of a lawsuit with the British Consul Richard Charlton. The captain continued to take voyages to raise money for the construction of a house. In 1846 he sailed for China on the Brig William Neilson, intending to purchase Chinese-made furniture for the house, which was nearing completion. The ship was lost at sea, along with the American Agent George Brown, and Mary Dominis became a widow. She rented out a suite of rooms to support herself and young John Owen. One of the first boarders was Anthony Ten Eyck, an American Commissioner to the Kingdom of Hawaiʻi appointed by President James K. Polk who established the American Legation in the house. Ten Eyck named the house "Washington Place" in a February 22, 1848 letter, after George Washington in celebration of the first United States president's birthday. King Kamehameha III officially approved the name.

The American flag was raised at the residence until Mary Dominis's death in 1889, when Liliʻuokalani had it removed. In 1917, Queen Liliʻuokalani raised the American flag again at Washington Place in honor of five Hawaiian sailors who had perished in the sinking of the SS Aztec by German submarines. Her act was interpreted by many as her symbolic support of the United States.

The building was designed by the master carpenter Isaac Hart, who had helped build the first ʻIolani Palace. The building was also constructed by Daniel Jenner, an Italian master mason. The interior was originally finished by the master painter Israel Wright. Native Hawaiians were also involved with the construction of the building, but are not named individually by archival records. Washington Place was constructed with "open lānais" on all sides.

The foundation of the building, the lower level walls and the lower columns are constructed of coral stone, while the upper floor is of wood-frame construction. Washington Place conforms to period French Creole Greek Revival houses that were built along the lower Gulf Coastal region of the southeastern United States. The home was constructed with an almost square core surrounded by a peristyle, a two tiered verandah, Tuscan columns on its upper floor, and a hipped roof. The interior of the home is arranged in a traditional Georgian floor plan, with four distinct parlors on the first floor and four bedchambers on the second floor.

== History ==
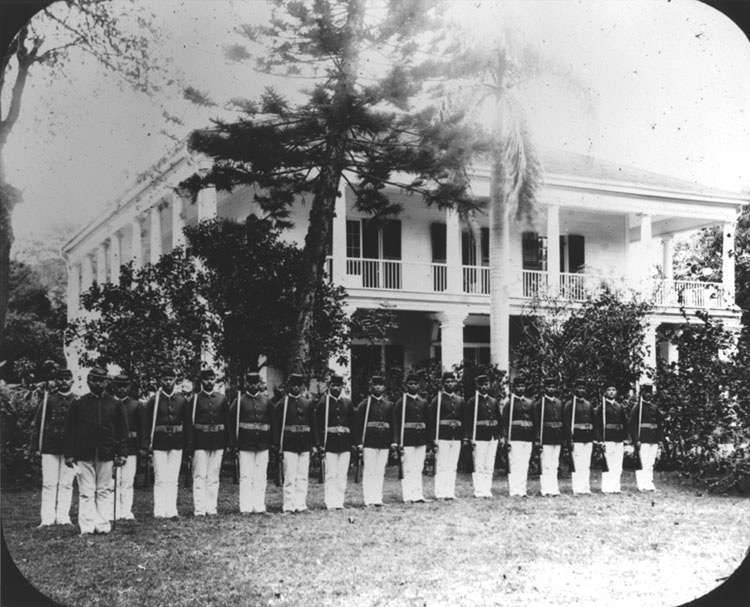
The house circa 1891–1893

William Little Lee made Washington Place his home from 1849–1854. Lee was instrumental in integrating a Western legal system in the Hawaiian Islands, based upon the Massachusetts model. Lee also authored the Great Māhele, which introduced private land ownership into Hawaiian culture.

Lydia Kamakaʻeha Pākī, the future Queen Liliʻuokalani and the heir apparent to the throne of the Kingdom of Hawaiʻi, married John Owen Dominis in 1862, making Washington Place the private residence of the princess and future queen. Another Massachusetts lawyer, Alfred S. Hartwell, rented a guest room from 1868 until 1872. He describes Mary Dominis as still expecting her husband to return any day. She died on April 25, 1889, and her son John Owen Dominis died on August 27, 1891, leaving the property to Liliʻuokalani, who had just succeeded her brother, King Kalākaua, upon his demise earlier that year on January 20.

=== Arrest of the Queen ===
In 1893, Washington Place was the site of dramatic events in the overthrow of the Hawaiian Kingdom. It was there that Queen Liliʻuokalani was arrested by the new governmental forces that were aided by a detachment of United States Marines. She was tried before a military tribunal, charged with concealment of treason against the new government of the Republic of Hawaiʻi. The former monarch was convicted and was confined for several months at Washington Place after her release from imprisonment at ʻIolani Palace.

Liliʻuokalani resided at Washington Place for the remainder of her life, dying in the downstairs bedroom on November 11, 1917. The home offers the citizens of Hawaiʻi a strong sense of place and belonging in association with the kingdom and of Queen Liliʻuokalani's memory.

=== Executive Mansion ===
In her book, Hawaiʻi's Story by Hawaiʻi's Queen, Liliʻuokalani described the building as "a palatial dwelling" and a "choice tropical retreat in the midst of the chief city of the Hawaiian islands."

On May 14, 1921, the Hawaiʻi Territorial Legislature purchased Washington Place for $55,000 from the estate of Queen Liliʻuokalani to serve as the Executive Mansion of the Territorial Governor of Hawaii. It was remodeled in 1922 by Governor Wallace Rider Farrington. It was the residence of twelve territorial and state governors of Hawaiʻi; some consider a thirteenth being John Owen Dominis, Liliʻuokalani's consort, had been Governor of the island of Oʻahu from 1868 to 1891. The house served in this role until 2002, when it was converted into a historic house museum. It was listed on the National Register of Historic Places on June 18, 1973, and was designated a National Historic Landmark on March 29, 2007.

In 2002 a new governor's residence was built within the grounds behind Washington Place, and continues to serve the same purpose.

== Gallery ==
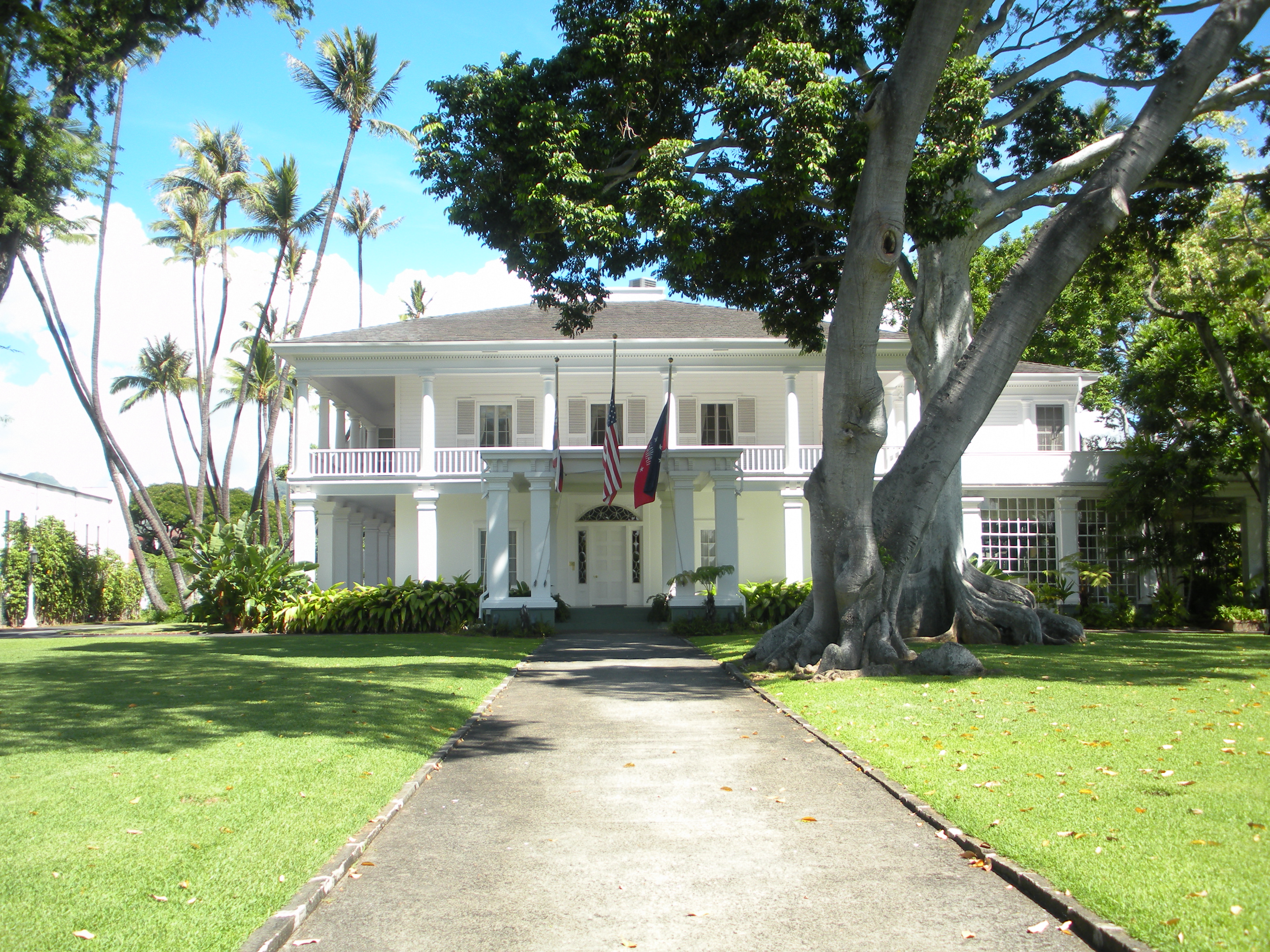
Washington Place, seen from the street. (10/2012)

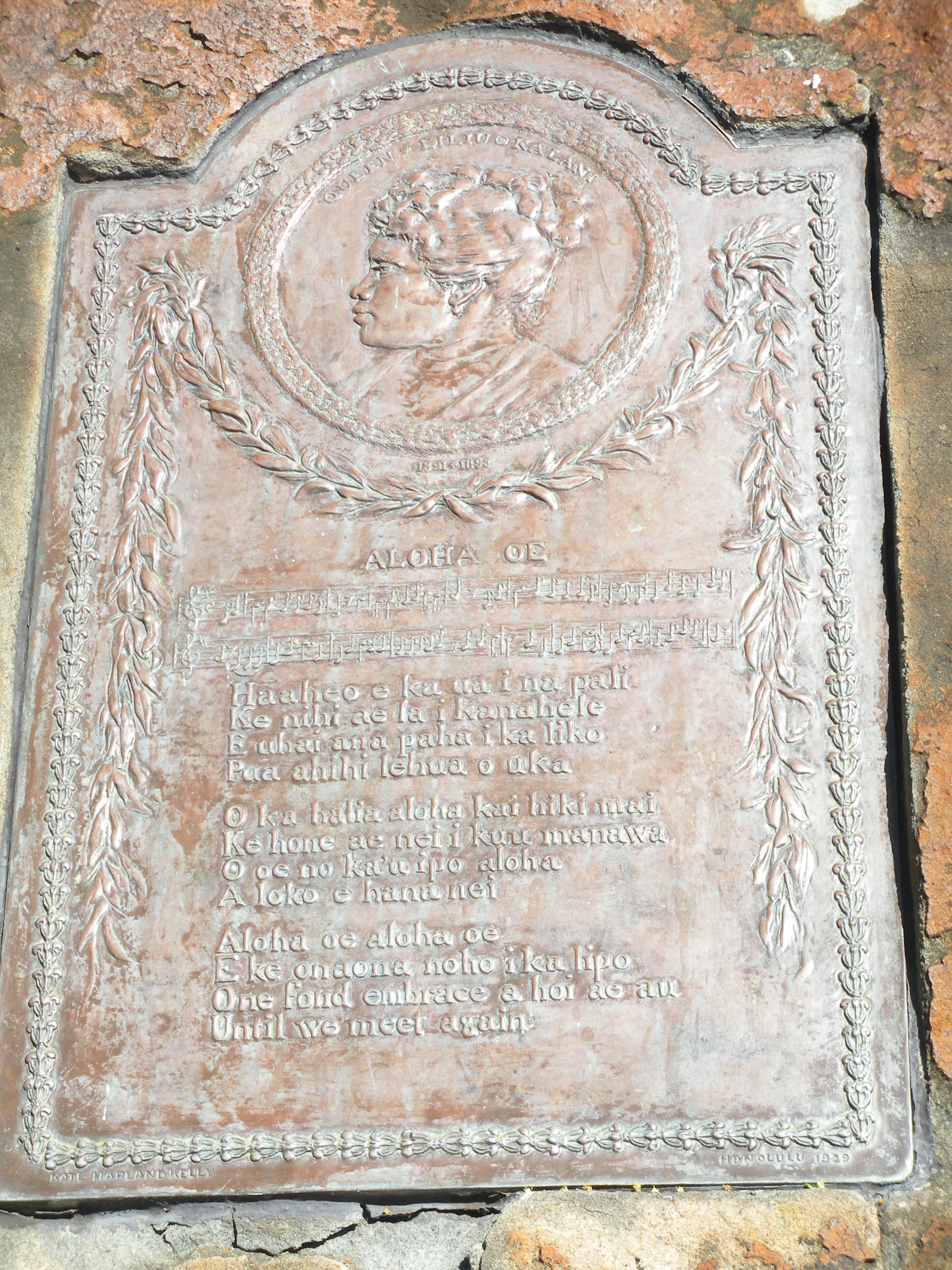
Plaque - Queen Lili'uokalani's home - close-up. (10/2012)

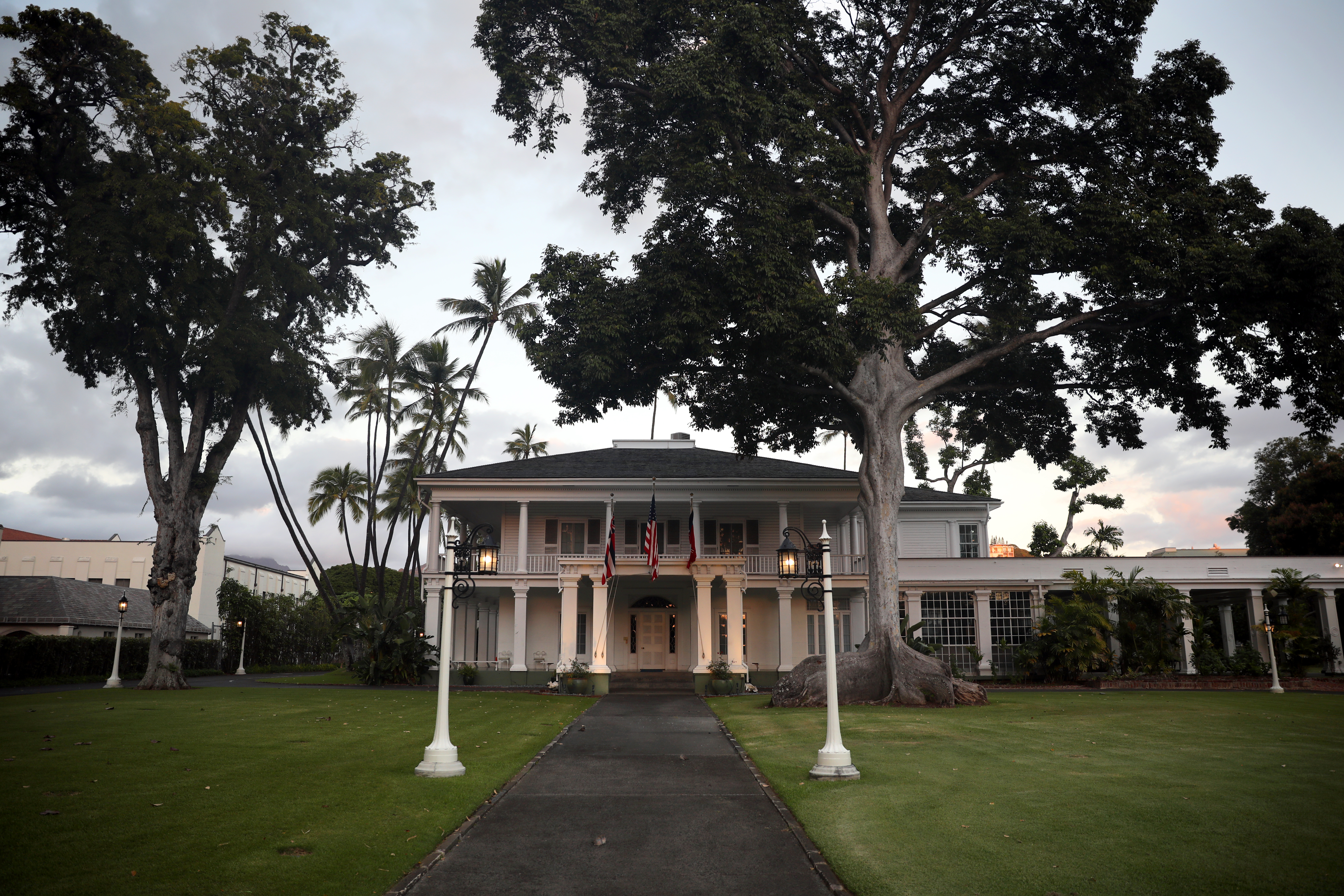
2022 photograph

== See also ==
- List of governors of Hawaiʻi
