= Governor of Hawaii =

Chief executive of the U.S. state of Hawaii

- Hawaiian: Ke Kiaʻāina o Hawaiʻi
- Gubernatorial logo

- Standard of the governor

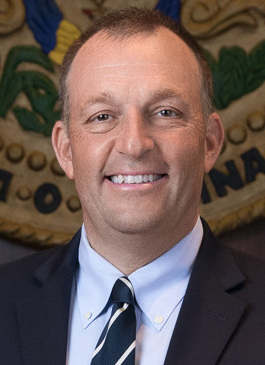
- Incumbent; Josh Green since December 5, 2022
- Government of Hawaii
- Residence: Washington Place
- Term length: Four years, renewable once consecutively
- Precursor: Governor of Hawaii Territory
- Inaugural holder: William F. Quinn
- Formation: August 21, 1959 (67 years ago)
- Succession: Line of succession
- Deputy: Lieutenant Governor of Hawaii
- Salary: $184,860
- Website: Official website

The governor of Hawaii (Hawaiian: Ke Kiaʻāina o Hawaiʻi) is the head of government of the U.S. state of Hawaii and its various agencies and departments, as provided in the Hawaii State Constitution Article V, Sections 1 through 6. It is a directly elected position, votes being cast by popular suffrage of residents of the state. The incumbent governor is Democrat Josh Green.

The governor is responsible for enforcing laws passed by the Hawaii State Legislature and upholding rulings of the Hawaii State Judiciary. The role includes being commander-in-chief of the armed forces of Hawaii and having the power to use those forces to execute laws, suppress insurrection and violence, and repel invasion. The lieutenant governor of Hawaii becomes acting governor upon the governor's absence from the state or inability to discharge the powers and duties of the office. Historically, the governor of Hawaii has been from either the Democratic Party of Hawaii or Hawaii Republican Party.

The current governor of Hawaii is Democrat Josh Green, who assumed the position on December 5, 2022. Hawaii was the first U.S. state to have an Asian American chief executive; George Ariyoshi served three terms between 1974 and 1986.

== Qualifications ==
The governor of Hawaii is limited to two four-year terms. Inauguration takes place on the first Monday in December, following a gubernatorial election. A single term ends at noon four years later. There is no lifetime limit on the number of times a governor may be elected, but a governor who has been elected to two consecutive terms must be out of office for at least one election cycle before being eligible once again for re-election. A governor is:

- required to be at least thirty years old,
- required to have been a resident of Hawaii for five consecutive years previous to election,
- barred from other professions or paid positions during the term.

== Authority ==
Flag of the governor

Flag of the governor before statehood in 1959

The governor and lieutenant governor (running together on the same ticket) are the only two elected statewide executive officers in Hawaii. All other statewide executives (such as attorney general, auditor) are appointed by either the governor or the state legislature.

Also, the governor of Hawaii has wide-reaching authority comparably stronger than the other governors in the Union; administrative powers are more centralized than that of most other states with little authority devolved to the counties, and unlike other states there are no local school districts. Included within the governor's sphere of jurisdiction is the power to appoint all judges of the various courts within the Hawaiian judicial system, subject to Senatorial approval.

The state of Hawaii does not have fixed cabinet positions and departments. By law, the governor of Hawaii has the power to create their cabinet and departments as needed, as long as the executive department is composed of no more than twenty bodies and cabinet members. The governor of Hawaii is also empowered to remove cabinet officers at will, with the exception of the attorney general of Hawaii, who must be removed by an act of the Hawaii State Senate.

== Residence ==
The governor of Hawaii's official residence previously was Washington Place, a mansion that was once a minor royal palace of Queen Liliʻuokalani and her husband, Prince Consort John Owen Dominis. The mansion is located across the street from the Hawaii State Capitol, where the Office of the Governor is located, and is accessed from the Capitol through underground passages beneath Beretania Street in downtown Honolulu. Befitting of its history as a former royal palace, the governors of Hawaii have entertained royal families from around the world at Washington Place including Queen Elizabeth II and Emperors Hirohito and Akihito.

In 2001, the new mansion for the governor was built on the grounds of Washington Place, after the state decided to turn Washington Place into a museum, an idea supported by then-Governor Benjamin J. Cayetano and family. This new mansion, Hale Kia Aina, was completed in 2002. Cayetano became the first governor to live in it for a few days before leaving office. His successor, Governor Linda Lingle, became the first governor to begin a term in the new mansion. Despite the building of this new mansion, Washington Place remains the official residence of the governor and is still used for state dinners and other official functions.

== Timeline ==
Timeline of Hawaii governors

== See also ==
- List of governors of Hawaii
- Royal Governor of Hawaii
- Royal Governor of Maui
- Royal Governor of Oahu
- Royal Governor of Kauai
