= 2022 Hawaii gubernatorial election =

- November 8, 2022
- Turnout: 48.44% ▼
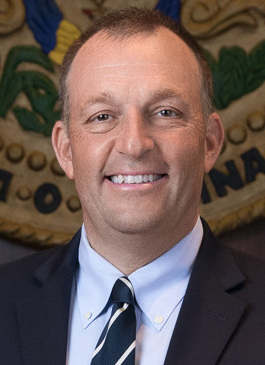

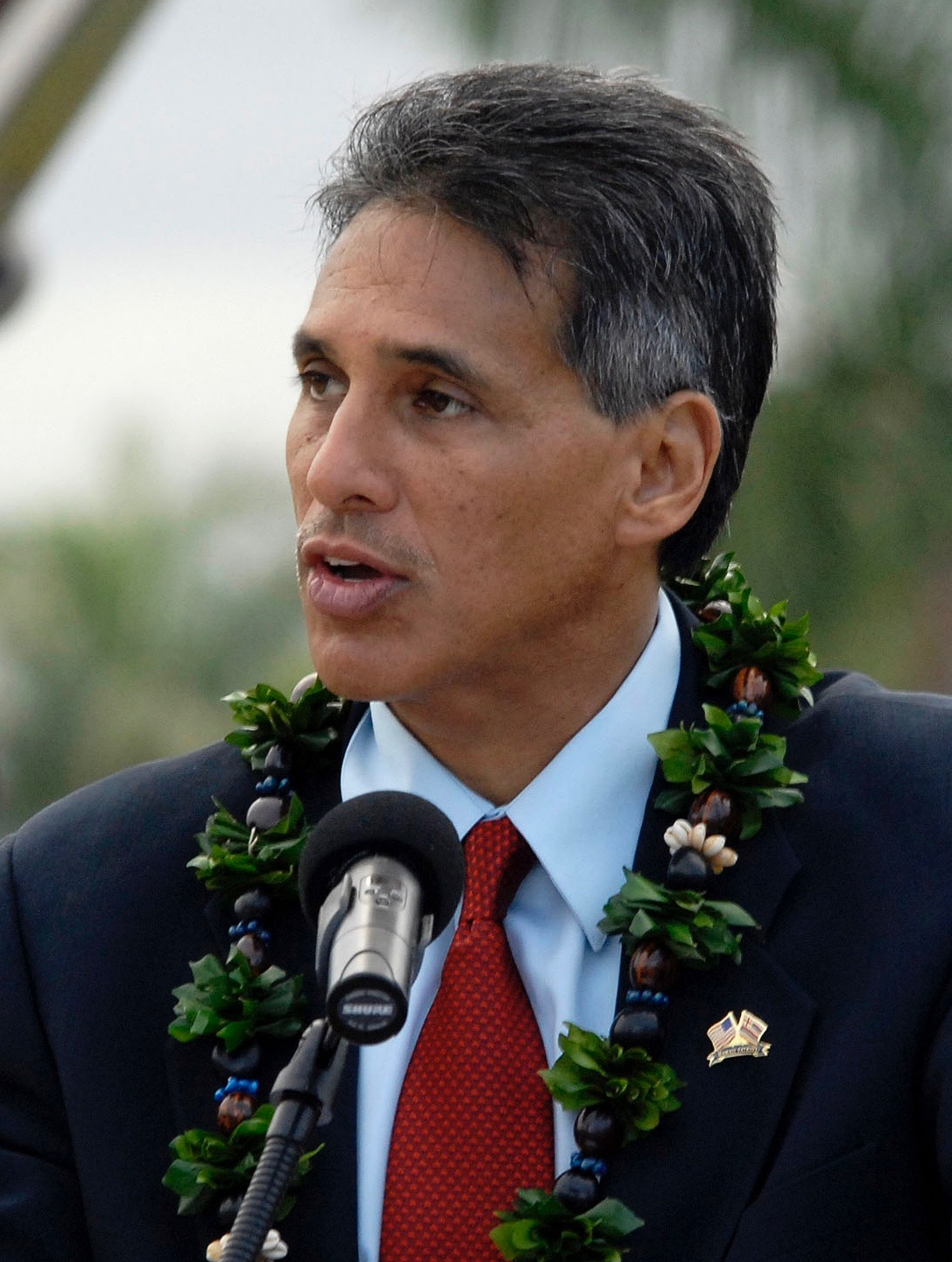
Nominee	Josh Green	Duke Aiona
Party	Democratic	Republican
Running mate	Sylvia Luke	Seaula Tupa'i Jr.
Popular vote	261,025	152,237
Percentage	63.16%	36.84%
- Green: 50–60% 60–70% 70–80% 80–90% >90% Aiona: 50–60% 60–70% 70–80% 80–90% >90% No votes
Governor before election
David Ige
Democratic
Elected Governor
Josh Green
Democratic

The 2022 Hawaii gubernatorial election took place on November 8, 2022, to elect the next governor of Hawaii. Incumbent Democratic governor David Ige was term-limited and ineligible to run for a third term. Incumbent lieutenant governor Josh Green was the Democratic nominee, and faced former lieutenant governor Duke Aiona, the Republican nominee. This marked the third time Aiona had been the Republican gubernatorial nominee, having previously run unsuccessfully in 2010 and 2014. Green won the election with 63.2% of the vote.

Green's performance was the highest percentage of the vote ever received by any gubernatorial candidate in the state's history, surpassing the record from the previous election. Despite this, Aiona performed 3 points better and received 20,000 more raw votes than Andria Tupola did in 2018, likely because there were no third-party candidates in the 2022 race. Green is the first Hawaii governor born after Hawaii's statehood.

== Democratic primary ==
=== Governor ===
==== Candidates ====
===== Nominee =====
- Josh Green, lieutenant governor of Hawaii (2018–present) and former state senator (2008–2018)

===== Eliminated in primary =====
- David Bourgoin, business consultant and candidate for mayor of Honolulu in 2020
- Vicky Cayetano, former First Lady of Hawaii (1997–2002) and wife to former governor Ben Cayetano
- Kai Kahele, U.S. representative for Hawaii's 2nd congressional district (2021–2023)
- Richard Kim, dentist, musician, and candidate for governor in 2018
- Clyde Lewman, realtor
- Van Tanabe, perennial candidate

===== Withdrew =====
- Kirk Caldwell, former mayor of Honolulu (2013–2021) and former state representative (2002–2008)

===== Declined =====
- Donovan Dela Cruz, state senator (2011–present)
- Colleen Hanabusa, former U.S. representative for Hawaii's 1st congressional district (2011–2015, 2016–2019), candidate for the U.S. Senate in 2014, candidate for governor in 2018, and candidate for mayor of Honolulu in 2020
- Sharon Har, state representative (2007–present)

===== Endorsements =====
Kirk Caldwell (withdrew)

Individual

- Derek Kawakami, Mayor of Kauai
Vicky Cayetano

Organizations

- Patsy T. Mink Foundation
Josh Green

Labor unions

- Hawaii Fire Fighters Association
- Hawaii Government Employees Association (HGEA), AFSCME Local 152, AFL–CIO
- Hawaii Lodging and Tourism Association
- Hawaii Regional Council of Carpenters
- Hawaii State AFL-CIO
- Hawaii State Teachers Association (HSTA)
- International Brotherhood of Electrical Workers Locals 1186, 1260 and 1357
- International Longshore and Warehouse Union Local 142
- Maui Lodging and Tourism Association
- Operating Engineers Local 3
- Plumbers & Fitters UA Local 675
- Unite Here Local 5 hotel workers union
- University of Hawaii Professional Assembly (UHPA)

Publications

- Honolulu Star-Advertiser Editorial Board
Kai Kahele

Labor unions

- Ironworkers Local 625
- Plasterers & Cement Masons, Local 630
- United Public Workers of America

==== Polling ====
Graphical summary

Poll source	Date(s) administered	Sample size (Note: Key: A – all adults RV – registered voters LV – likely voters V – unclear)	Margin of error	Kirk Caldwell	Vicky Cayetano	Josh Green	Kai Kahele	Undecided
Mason-Dixon	July 12–17, 2022	317 (LV)	± 5.6%	–	19%	55%	16%	10%
MRG Research	June 28–30, 2022	782 (LV)	± 4.0%	–	15%	48%	16%	22%
	May 4, 2022	Caldwell withdraws from the race						
Public Policy Polling (D) (Note: This poll was sponsored by 314 Action, which endorsed Josh Green)	February 8–9, 2022	644 (LV)	± 3.9%	5%	10%	46%	14%	25%
Public Policy Polling (D)	February 8–9, 2022	644 (LV)	± 3.9%	–	10%	48%	17%	25%
Mason-Dixon	January 24–28, 2022	320 (LV)	± 5.6%	11%	8%	58%	–	23%
Public Policy Polling (D)	November 5–6, 2021	600 (LV)	± 4.0%	7%	14%	51%	–	28%
Public Policy Polling (D)	November 5–6, 2021	600 (LV)	± 4.0%	–	21%	58%	–	–

==== Results ====
Results by county: Green—60–70% Green—40–50%

Democratic primary results
Party	Candidate	Votes	%
Democratic	Josh Green	158,161	62.91%
Democratic	Vicky Cayetano	52,447	20.86%
Democratic	Kai Kahele	37,738	15.01%
Democratic	Van Tanabe	1,236	0.49%
Democratic	Richard Kim	991	0.39%
Democratic	David Bourgoin	590	0.23%
Democratic	Clyde Lewman	249	0.10%
Total votes		251,412	100.0%

=== Lieutenant governor ===
==== Candidates ====
===== Nominee =====
- Sylvia Luke, state representative (1999–2022) and House Finance Committee chair (2013–2022)

===== Eliminated in primary =====
- Keith Amemiya, business executive and candidate for mayor of Honolulu in 2020
- Ikaika Anderson, former member (2009–2020) and chair (2019–2020) of the Honolulu City Council
- Daniel H. Cunningham, independent candidate for governor in 2002 and 2010
- Sherry Menor-McNamara, president and CEO of Chamber of Commerce Hawaii (2013–present)
- Sam Puletasi, candidate for lieutenant governor in 2014 and for Hawaii's 1st congressional district in 2016 and 2018

===== Withdrew =====
- Jill Tokuda, former state senator (2006–2018) and candidate for lieutenant governor in 2018 (successfully ran for U.S. House)

===== Declined =====
- Sergio Alcubilla, attorney and former director of external relations, Legal Aid Society of Hawaii (ran for Hawaii's 1st congressional district)
- Donovan Dela Cruz, state senator
- Joey Manahan, Honolulu City Councilmember (2013–2021) and former state representative (2007–2013)
- Kym Pine, former state representative, former Honolulu City Councilmember, and candidate for Mayor of Honolulu in 2020
- Scott Saiki, Speaker of the Hawaii House of Representatives

==== Endorsements ====
Keith Amemiya

Labor unions

- Ironworkers Local 625
Ikaika Anderson

Individuals

- Neil Abercrombie, former governor of Hawaii
- Bernard Carvalho, former mayor of Kauai County
- Ann Kobayashi, former Honolulu city councilmember and chair
- Tommy Waters, Honolulu city councilmember and chair
- Kumu Hinaleimoana Wong-Kalu, Native Hawaiian scholar and advocate

Labor unions

- Hawai‘i Regional Council of Carpenters (HRCC)
- Masons Union No. 1
- State of Hawaii Organization of Police Officers (SHOPO)
Sherry Menor-McNamara

Organizations

- Japanese Chamber of Commerce and Industry of Hawaii
Sylvia Luke

Individuals

- George Ariyoshi, former governor of Hawaii
- Jason Higa, president of FCH Enterprises
- Della Au Belatti, state representative
- Dwight Takamine, former state senator

Labor unions

- Hawaii Government Employees Association (HGEA), AFSCME Local 152, AFL–CIO
- Hawaii State Teachers Association (HSTA)
- IBEW Local 1186
- ILWU Local 142
- ILWU Local 100
- Plasterers & Cement Masons, Local 630
- Operating Engineers, Local 3
- Plumbers & Fitters UA, Local 675
- United Public Workers, AFSCME, Local 646, AFL-CIO
- University of Hawaii Professional Assembly (UHPA)
- Hawaii Firefighters Association, Local 1463
- Hawaii Laborers’ Union LiUNA Local 368

Organizations and professional associations

- Americans for Democratic Action
- General Contractors Association of Hawai‘i
- Patsy T. Mink PAC
- Hawaii Association of Realtors
- Hawaii Lodging and Tourism Association

Publications

- Honolulu Star-Advertiser Editorial Board

==== Polling ====
Poll source	Date(s) administered	Sample size	Margin of error	Keith Amemiya	Ikaika Anderson	Sylvia Luke	Sherry Menor-McNamara	Jill Tokuda	Undecided
Mason-Dixon	July 12–17, 2022	317 (LV)	± 5.6%	19%	18%	21%	4%	–	38%
MRG Research	June 28–30, 2022	782 (LV)	± 4.0%	10%	14%	20%	7%	–	48%
	April 27, 2022	Tokuda withdraws from the race							
Mason-Dixon	January 24–28, 2022	320 (LV)	± 5.6%	8%	9%	3%	7%	13%	60%

==== Results ====
Results by county: Luke—<40% Anderson—<40%

Democratic primary results
Party	Candidate	Votes	%
Democratic	Sylvia Luke	87,797	36.23%
Democratic	Ikaika Anderson	67,462	27.84%
Democratic	Keith Amemiya	57,199	23.60%
Democratic	Sherry Menor-McNamara	25,349	10.46%
Democratic	Sam Puletasi	2,328	0.96%
Democratic	Daniel Cunningham	2,215	0.91%
Total votes		242,350	100.0%

== Republican primary ==
=== Governor ===
==== Candidates ====
===== Nominee =====
- Duke Aiona, former lieutenant governor (2002–2010) and nominee for governor in 2010 and 2014

===== Eliminated in primary =====
- Gary Cordery, businessman
- George Hawat
- Keline-Kameyo Kahau, Aloha ʻĀina candidate for Hawaii House of Representatives in 2020 (also filed for Aloha ʻĀina primary)
- Lynn Barry Mariano, retired Army Officer and Civil Servant
- Paul Morgan, business consultant and former member of the Hawaii Army National Guard
- Moses Paskowitz, realtor
- B.J. Penn, mixed martial arts and Brazilian jiu-jitsu practitioner and former UFC Champion
- Heidi Tsuneyoshi, Honolulu City Councilmember
- Walter Woods

===== Declined =====
- Peter Savio, businessperson and real estate developer
- Andria Tupola, Honolulu City Councilmember (2021–present), former Minority Leader of the Hawaii House of Representatives (2017–2018), and nominee for governor in 2018

===== Endorsements =====
Duke Aiona

Labor unions

- State of Hawaii Organization of Police Officers, police union

Publications

- Honolulu Star-Advertiser Editorial Board

==== Polling ====
Poll source	Date(s) administered	Sample size	Margin of error	Duke Aiona	Gary Cordery	Lynn Barry Mariano	Paul Morgan	B.J. Penn	Heidi Haunani Tsuneyoshi	Undecided
Mason-Dixon	July 12–17, 2022	133 (LV)	± 8.7%	48%	–	–	–	26%	9%	17%
MRG Research	June 28–30, 2022	269 (LV)	± 6.0%	27%	7%	3%	1%	24%	9%	29%

==== Results ====
Results by county: Aiona—50–60% Aiona—40–50%

Republican primary results
Party	Candidate	Votes	%
Republican	Duke Aiona	37,608	49.57%
Republican	B.J. Penn	19,817	26.12%
Republican	Gary Cordery	8,258	10.88%
Republican	Heidi Haunani Tsuneyoshi	7,255	9.56%
Republican	Lynn Barry Mariano	903	1.19%
Republican	Paul Morgan	796	1.05%
Republican	Keline Kahau	469	0.62%
Republican	Walter Woods	438	0.58%
Republican	Moses Paskowitz	189	0.25%
Republican	George Hawat	140	0.18%
Total votes		75,873	100.0%

=== Lieutenant governor ===
==== Candidates ====
===== Nominee =====
- Seaula Tupa'i Jr., pastor

===== Eliminated in primary =====
- Rob Burns, realtor
- Tae Kim, candidate for Honolulu prosecutor in 2020

==== Results ====
Results by county: Tupai—60–70% Tupai—50–60%

Republican primary results
Party	Candidate	Votes	%
Republican	Seaula Tupai Jr.	35,798	53.56%
Republican	Rob Burns	23,121	34.60%
Republican	Tae Kim	7,911	11.84%
Total votes		66,830	100.0%

== Nonpartisan primary ==
Under Hawaii law, a nonpartisan candidate must either receive at least ten percent of the vote for that office (32,729 votes for governor or 30,918 votes for lieutenant governor) or receive a vote "equal to or greater than the lowest vote received by the partisan candidate who was nominated" (37,608 votes for governor or 35,798 votes for lieutenant governor) to qualify for the general election ballot. Because none of the nonpartisan candidates for governor or lieutenant governor met that threshold, no nonpartisan candidates for governor or lieutenant governor advanced to the general election.

=== Governor ===
==== Candidates ====
===== Eliminated in primary =====
- Caleb Nazara, pastor
- Keleionalani Taylor, activist

==== Results ====
Nonpartisan primary results
Party	Candidate	Votes	%
Nonpartisan	Keleionalani Taylor	755	61.94%
Nonpartisan	Caleb Nazara	464	38.06%
Total votes		1,219	100.0%

=== Lieutenant governor ===
==== Candidates ====
===== Nominee =====
- Charles Keoho

==== Results ====
Nonpartisan primary results
Party	Candidate	Votes	%
Nonpartisan	Charles Keoho	1,030	100.0%
Total votes		1,030	100.0%

== General election ==
=== Predictions ===
Source	Ranking	As of
The Cook Political Report	Solid D	March 4, 2022
Inside Elections	Solid D	March 4, 2022
Sabato's Crystal Ball	Safe D	January 26, 2022
Politico	Solid D	April 1, 2022
RCP	Safe D	January 10, 2022
Fox News	Solid D	May 12, 2022
538	Solid D	June 30, 2022
Elections Daily	Safe D	November 7, 2022

=== Post-primary endorsements ===
Josh Green (D)

Organizations

- 314 Action

Labor unions

- National Education Association

Publications

- Honolulu Star-Advertiser Editorial Board (co-endorsed with Aiona)
Duke Aiona (R)

Publications

- Honolulu Star-Advertiser Editorial Board (co-endorsed with Green)

=== Results ===
State Senate district results

State House district results

2022 Hawaii gubernatorial election
Party	Candidate	Votes	%	±%
Democratic	Josh Green; Sylvia Luke	261,025	63.16%	+0.49%
Republican	Duke Aiona; Seaula Tupa'i Jr.	152,237	36.84%	+3.14%
Total votes		413,262	100.00%	
Turnout		417,215	48.44%	–4.24
Registered electors		861,358		
Democratic hold				

==== By county ====
By county

County	Josh Green Democratic		Duke Aiona Republican		Margin		Total votes
County	#	%	#	%	#	%	Total votes
Hawaii	42,152	65.84	21,870	34.16	20,282	31.68	64,022
Honolulu	170,575	62.36	102,968	37.64	67,607	24.72	273,543
Kauaʻi	14,227	59.63	9,632	40.37	4,595	19.26	23,859
Maui	33,930	65.79	17,641	34.21	16,289	31.58	51,571
Totals	259,901	63.21	151,258	36.79	108,643	26.42	411,159

==== By congressional district ====
Green won both congressional districts.

District	Green	Aiona	Representative
1st	64%	36%	Ed Case
2nd	62%	38%	Kai Kahele (117th Congress)
2nd	62%	38%	Jill Tokuda (118th Congress)

== Notes ==
Partisan clients
