= John Carroll (Hawaii politician) =

American politician (1929–2021)

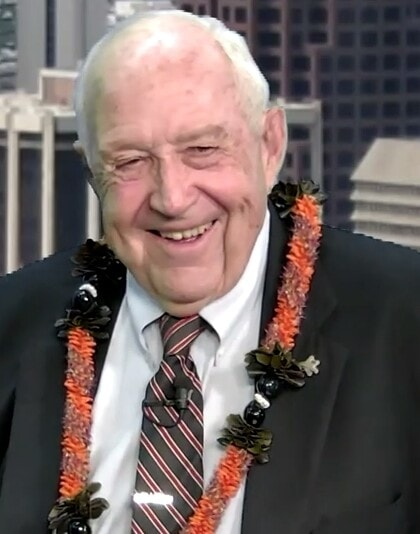
- Carroll in 2016

Member of the Hawaii Senate from the 6th District
- In office January 17, 1979 – January 1981

Member of the Hawaii House of Representatives
- In office January 21, 1971 – January 17, 1979

Personal details
- Born: John Stanley Carroll; December 18, 1929 St. Marys, Kansas, U.S.
- Died: September 19, 2021 (aged 91) Oahu, Hawaii, U.S.
- Party: Republican
- Spouse: Jean Yonemori
- Children: 6
- Education: University of Hawaii, Hilo; University of Hawaii, Manoa (BEd); St. Mary's University, Texas (JD)
- Website: Campaign website

Military service
- Allegiance: United States
- Branch/service: United States Army; United States Air Force
- Years of service: 1951–1953 (Active); 1956–1985 (Reserve)
- Rank: Colonel
- Battles/wars: Korean War

John Stanley Carroll (December 18, 1929 – September 19, 2021) was an American lawyer and politician who served as a state representative and state senator from Hawaii as a Republican. He was also a perennial candidate for multiple statewide offices in Hawaii.

== Early life ==
John Stanley Carroll was born in St. Marys, Kansas, on December 18, 1929, to Laura Fay and Hugh "Stanley" Carroll, a chemistry professor who later worked on the Manhattan Project. He initially began his education at Saint Mary's University, but in 1949 he moved to the Territory of Hawaii on a scholarship to play football for the University of Hawaii at Hilo. He later transferred to the University of Hawaii at Manoa and graduated with a bachelor's degree in education.

During the Korean War he served in the United States Army and later transferred to the United States Air Force. He graduated from the Air Command and Staff College and the Air War College, became a staff judge advocate for the Army National Guard and the Air National Guard, and retired from the Air Force as a colonel. After military service, he worked as a pilot for Hawaiian Airlines.

== Career ==
In 1966, Carroll ran for one of Hawaii's two at-large congressional district seats; he came in third behind incumbents Patsy Mink and Spark Matsunaga. He briefly ran for the House again in 1968, but dropped out of that race and ran instead for one of the Honolulu City Council's six at-large seats; he came in eighth of twelve candidates.

=== State Legislature ===
==== House ====
On August 17, 1970, Carroll announced that he would seek the Republican nomination for one of three 12th state house district seats; he came in first, ahead of five other candidates. A residency challenge argued that he was currently living in the 13th District, which would have rendered him ineligible to run, but the challenge was rejected by Lieutenant Governor Thomas Gill.

On July 24, 1972, he announced that he would seek reelection; he came in second of six candidates. He was redistricted into the 11th House District, which only had two seats; on July 31, 1974, he announced that he would seek a third term, and placed first out of four candidates. On July 29, 1976, he announced that he would seek a fourth term; he placed second out of five candidates.

Carroll proposed a bill that would create the procedure for the state constitution's impeachment provisions for a governor or lieutenant governor (the state constitution specified that the state legislature could do it, but not how to do it), the ability to recall elected officials, and also proposed a constitutional amendment for an environmental bill of rights.

In 1971, the state legislature was rewriting the state's penal code and considering the possibility of repealing its sodomy laws. Carroll supported repeal; he read a letter written by students from the University of Hawaii Gay Students Union, asking the state legislature to legalize homosexual sex between consenting adults.

In 1973, he introduced a bill that would prevent the charge of marijuana possession from appearing on arrest records, and would reduce the penalty for possession to a $25 fine. Later that year, he and three other Republicans also supported a bill increasing the minimum wage from $1.80 to $2.40.

In 1975, he proposed multiple bills that would create voter initiative and referendum systems. He also proposed a bill (later defeated) that would allow for the recalling of elected officials and a Castle doctrine amendment to Hawaii's penal code.

During his tenure in the House, he served on the Judiciary and Environmental Protection committees.

==== Senate ====
In late 1977, Carroll stated at a fundraiser that he was considering running for a seat in the Hawaii Senate. On July 6, 1978, he announced that he would run for one of Hawaii's four 6th Senate District seats; he came in second out of seven candidates.

During his tenure he served on the Judiciary, Agriculture, Economic Development, Consumer Protection and Commerce, and Government, Operations and Efficiency committees.

He introduced legislation that would ban public employees from striking. He was against Hawaii's expansion of its fishing industry; he and asked Governor George Ariyoshi to ban lobster harvesting along the Leeward Islands, and voted against a resolution supporting the District of Columbia Delegate Act.

The 6th District was redistricted from four seats down to two; in the 1980 election, both incumbents, John Carroll and Anson Chong, narrowly lost reelection.

=== Post-Legislature ===
In June 1981, he was elected chairman of the Hawaii Republican Party with 341 out of 572 votes. During his tenure as chairman, he attempted to change the party's predominantly Caucasian image and to organize the party in every precinct. He refused to resign after the party's poor performance in the 1982 elections; on November 5, 1982, two party officers resigned in protest. Carroll eventually chose not to seek reelection in 1983.

In 1979, he had invested in a diamond mine; in 1994, he filed for bankruptcy, claiming that two business partners attempted to take over his company. In 1998, Carroll ran for Hawaii's 1st Senate District, but was defeated in the general election by Lorraine Inouye.

On May 25, 2000, he announced that he would run in the Senate election against Senator Daniel Akaka, and easily won the Republican nomination. In May, he had stated that he would need $1.5 million to launch a viable campaign against Akaka, but by late October Carroll had raised less than $2,000 - while Akaka had raised $430,000. He ran campaign ads that opened with, "Aloha, I'm John Carroll, and in no way am I a racist;" in the general election, he lost to Akaka.

On November 10, 2001, he announced that he would challenge Linda Lingle for the Republican nomination for governor in the 2002 election. He described Lingle as "unelectable," referencing her support in 1998 from anti-Cayetano voters who would remain Democratic in the 2002 election. However, he was defeated in a landslide in the primary, receiving less than 10% of the vote; Lingle received almost 90% and went on to win the general election. Carroll ran unsuccessfully for the United States House of Representatives in 2002. On May 27, 2009, he announced that he would challenge Lieutenant Governor Duke Aiona in the Republican gubernatorial primary, but received less than 5% of the vote.

On September 21, 2011, he announced that he would run for the Republican nomination for Senate against Linda Lingle; he campaigned against the Jones Act and a Native Hawaiian federal recognition bill. In the primary, he was again defeated by Lingle (she took over 90% of the vote); Carroll later endorsed Democratic Representative Mazie Hirono in the general election. In 2016, he announced that he would run in the Senate election and easily won the Republican nomination against other perennial candidates, but was defeated in a landslide by incumbent senator Brian Schatz.

In 2017, he faced potential disbarment over two 2015 complaints of professional misconduct and agreed to give up his law license.

Following the 2018 Hawaii false missile alert message sent by the State of Hawaii's Emergency Management Agency to hundreds of thousands of Hawaii residents via their phones on January 13, 2018, Carroll dubbed the incumbent Democratic governor David Ige "Doomsday David" and called on him to resign.

In 2018, he announced that he would seek the Republican nomination for governor. In mid-March, Carroll was leading state House Minority Leader Andria Tupola in the Honolulu Star-Advertiser's statewide poll of likely 2018 Republican voters by a margin of 12 percentage points, with 40% of potential Republican voters supporting Carroll as opposed to 28% supporting Tupola. Carroll was eventually defeated by Tupola by a 20% margin in the August 11 primary.

On June 14, 2019, Carroll announced his candidacy for the 2020 Honolulu mayoral election. He placed eighth in the primary, receiving 0.7% of the vote.

He died on September 19, 2021, in Oahu, Hawaii, at age 91.

== Electoral history ==
John Carroll electoral history

1966 Hawaii at-large Congressional District election
Party	Candidate	Votes	%	±%
Democratic	Patsy Mink (incumbent)	140,880	34.30%	+7.08%
Democratic	Spark Matsunaga (incumbent)	140,110	34.11%	−1.60%
Republican	John Carroll	67,281	16.38%	N/A
Republican	James Kealoha	62,473	15.21%	N/A
Total votes		166,806	100.00%	

1970 Hawaii 12th House District election
Party	Candidate	Votes	%
Republican	John Carroll	5,865	19.33%
Democratic	Herman Wedemeyer	5,397	17.79%
Republican	John R. Leopold	5,324	17.55%
Democratic	John W. Elliott	5,187	17.09%
Democratic	David M. Hagino	4,970	16.38%
Republican	James V. Hall	3,600	11.86%
Total votes		30,343	100.00%

1972 Hawaii 12th House District election
Party	Candidate	Votes	%	±%
Republican	John R. Leopold (incumbent)	8,844	28.22%	+10.67%
Republican	John Carroll (incumbent)	8,239	26.29%	+6.96%
Democratic	Herman Wedemeyer (incumbent)	7,787	24.85%	+7.06%
Democratic	John W. Elliott	6,985	22.29%	+5.20%
Democratic	Max Nakata Garcia	4,280	13.66%	N/A
Republican	Shirley Ann Sax	4,047	12.91%	N/A
Total votes		31,338	100.00%	

1974 Hawaii 11th House District election
Party	Candidate	Votes	%
Republican	John Carroll (incumbent)	4,730	31.02%
Republican	Kinaʻu Boyd Kamaliʻi	4,559	29.90%
Democratic	Karl H. Ihrig	3,402	22.31%
Democratic	Virginia Teipel	2,555	16.76%
Total votes		15,246	100.00%

1976 Hawaii 11th House District election
Party	Candidate	Votes	%	±%
Republican	Kinaʻu Boyd Kamaliʻi (incumbent)	5,955	34.54%	+4.64%
Republican	John Carroll (incumbent)	5,361	31.10%	+0.08%
Democratic	Jim Shon	3,579	20.76%	N/A
Democratic	Leeto Whitetto	1,511	8.76%	N/A
Independent	Larry Olsen	834	4.84%	N/A
Total votes		17,240	100.00%	

1978 Hawaii 6th Senate District election
Party	Candidate	Votes	%
Republican	Wadsworth Yee (incumbent)	14,975	17.19%
Republican	John Carroll	13,287	15.26%
Democratic	Neil Abercrombie	13,224	15.18%
Democratic	Anson Chong (incumbent)	12,365	14.20%
Republican	Ann H. Kobayashi	12,185	13.99%
Democratic	Richard E. Ando	10,548	12.11%
Democratic	Marion Heen Shim	10,507	12.06%
Total votes		87,091	100.00%

1978 Hawaii 6th Senate District election
Party	Candidate	Votes	%
Republican	Clifford Uwaine	19,061	25.35%
Democratic	Ann Kobayashi	18,459	24.55%
Republican	John Carroll (incumbent)	18,017	23.96%
Democratic	Anson Chong (incumbent)	17,482	23.25%
Libertarian	John Mills	2,177	2.90%
Total votes		75,196	100.00%

1998 Hawaii 1st Senate District Republican primary
Party	Candidate	Votes	%
Republican	John Carroll	2,750	56.87%
Republican	Chuck Clarke	2,086	43.14%
Total votes		4,836	100.00%

1998 Hawaii 1st Senate District election
Party	Candidate	Votes	%	±%
Democratic	Lorraine Inouye	9,337	56.18%	+0.30%
Republican	John Carroll	7,283	43.82%	−0.30%
Total votes		16,620	100.00%	

2000 Hawaii Senate Republican primary
Party	Candidate	Votes	%
Republican	John Carroll	33,349	71.48%
Republican	Eugene F. Douglass	6,117	13.11%
Republican	James DeLuze	3,910	8.38%
Republican	Harry Friel	3,277	7.02%
Total votes		46,653	100.00%

2000 Hawaii Senate election
Party	Candidate	Votes	%	±%
Democratic	Daniel Akaka	251,215	72.69%	+0.91%
Republican	John Carroll	84,701	24.51%	+0.32%
Natural Law	Lauri A. Clegg	4,220	1.22%	+1.22%
Libertarian	Lloyd Mallan	3,127	0.91%	−3.12%
Constitution	David Porter	2,360	0.68%	+0.68%
Total votes		345,623	100.00%	

2002 Hawaii Gubernatorial Republican primary
Party	Candidate	Votes	%
Republican	Linda Lingle	70,808	89.77%
Republican	John Carroll	7,616	9.66%
Republican	Crystal Young	454	0.58%
Total votes		78,878	100.00%

2010 Hawaii Gubernatorial Republican primary
Party	Candidate	Votes	%
Republican	Duke Aiona	42,520	95.34%
Republican	John Carroll	2,079	4.66%
Total votes		44,599	100.00%

2012 Hawaii Senate Republican primary
Party	Candidate	Votes	%
Republican	Linda Lingle	44,252	91.63%
Republican	John Carroll	2,900	6.01%
Republican	John P. Roco	545	1.13%
Republican	Charles Collins	366	0.76%
Republican	Edward Pirkowski	232	0.48%
Total votes		48,295	100.00%

2016 Hawaii Senate Republican primary
Party	Candidate	Votes	%
Republican	John Carroll	26,749	74.58%
Republican	John P. Roco	3,956	11.03%
Republican	Karla Gottschalk	3,045	8.49%
Republican	Eddie Pirkowski	2,115	5.90%
Total votes		35,865	100.00%

2016 Hawaii Senate election
Party	Candidate	Votes	%	±%
Democratic	Brian Schatz	306,604	73.61%	+3.83%
Republican	John Carroll	92,653	22.24%	−5.46%
Constitution	Joy Allison	9,103	2.19%	+2.19%
Libertarian	Michael Kokowski	6,809	1.63%	−0.89%
American Shopping	John Giuffre	1,393	0.33%	+0.33%
Total votes		416,562	100.00%	

2018 Hawaii Gubernatorial Republican primary
Party	Candidate	Votes	%
Republican	Andria Tupola	17,297	55.52%
Republican	John Carroll	10,974	35.22%
Republican	Raymond L'Heureux Sr.	2,885	9.26%
Total votes		31,156	100.00%

Honolulu mayoral primary election, August 8, 2020
Candidate	Votes	%
Rick Blangiardi	69,510	25.57%
Keith Amemiya	55,002	20.24%
Colleen Hanabusa	50,120	18.44%
Kymberly Pine	40,008	14.72%
Mufi Hannemann	26,975	9.92%
William "Bud" Stonebraker	17,710	6.51%
Choon James	5,520	2.03%
John Carroll	2,005	0.74%
Ho-Yin "Jason" Wong	1,434	0.53%
Ernest Caravalho	1,136	0.42%
Audrey Keesing	822	0.30%
Micah La'akea Mussell	538	0.20%
David "Duke" Bourgoin	367	0.14%
Karl O. Dicks	358	0.13%
Tim Garry	311	0.11%
Total votes	205,801	100%

Party political offices
Preceded by Maria Hustace	Republican nominee for U.S. Senator from Hawaii (Class 1); 2000	Succeeded by Jerry Coffee; Withdrew
Preceded by Campbell Cavasso	Republican nominee for U.S. Senator from Hawaii (Class 3); 2016	Succeeded by Bob McDermott
