= Keith Amemiya =

American business executive and politician (born 1965)

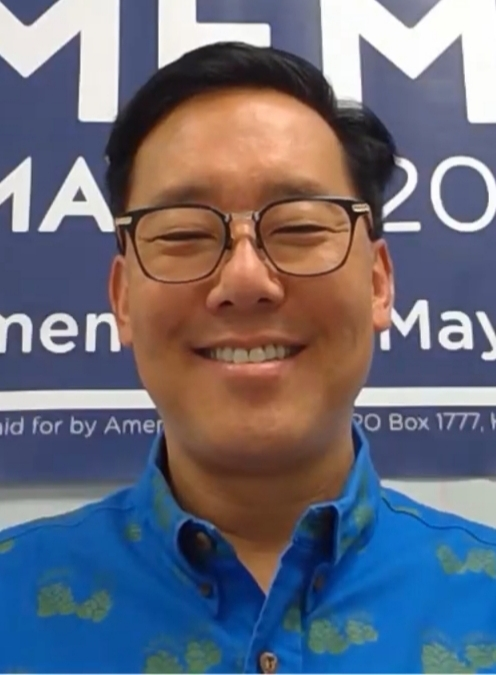
- Amemiya in 2020

Personal details
- Born: September 1, 1965 (age 61) Hawaiʻi Kai, Hawaii, U.S.
- Party: Democratic
- Spouse: Bonny Suzui (m. 1996)
- Children: 1
- Education: University of Hawaiʻi at Mānoa (BBA, JD)

Keith Yamashiro Amemiya (born September 1, 1965) is an American business executive and politician who ran in the 2020 Honolulu mayoral election, and in 2022 for lieutenant governor of Hawaii. In April 2026, Amemiya was appointed to the University of Hawaiʻi Board of Regents.

== Early life and education ==
Amemiya was born and raised in Hawaii Kai, a neighborhood of Honolulu, Hawaii. He is the son of former Hawaii Attorney General Ronald Amemiya and a mother who suffered from mental illness and experienced unstable housing. They divorced when he was 10 years old. Amemiya was later brought up by various relatives until he moved in with his best friend whose parents, Bert T. Kobayashi Jr. and Harriet Kobayashi, became his hānai parents. After graduating from Punahou in 1983, Amemiya studied finance and law at the University of Hawaiʻi at Mānoa, where he earned his degrees.

== Career ==
Before running for elected office, Amemiya was the senior vice president of Island Holdings, Inc., starting in 2012, and executive director of the Hawaii High School Athletic Association for 12 years, from 1998 to 2010. Until 2019 he was the campaign treasurer for U.S. Senator Brian Schatz, and he was appointed by several state leaders to serve on citizen boards, including the Honolulu Police Commission, Hawaii Board of Education, and Aloha Stadium Authority board. In February 2021, Amemiya was appointed as executive director of Central Pacific Bank Foundation.

In 2023, Governor Josh Green appointed Amemiya to lead the governor's sports task force, which develops sports strategies to benefit Hawaii. In 2024, he was recognized by the task force's parent department for bringing together donors to enable Hawaii's first girl's high school flag football season. Other projects in which Amemiya was involved include the state's first high school surfing championship and a new entertainment center with pickleball courts in downtown Honolulu, both realized in 2025.

In April 2026, Amemiya was appointed to the University of Hawaiʻi Board of Regents. He previously served as the board's executive administrator and secretary from 2010 to 2012.

== Elections ==
=== 2020 Honolulu mayoral election ===
With no candidate receiving an outright majority of the vote in the August 8 nonpartisan blanket primary, the top two finishers, Amemiya and Rick Blangiardi, advanced to a runoff on November 3. In the primary, former U.S. representative for Hawaii's 1st congressional district Colleen Hanabusa, former state senator John Carroll, and former mayor of Honolulu Mufi Hannemann were eliminated along with many other candidates. Blangiardi won the runoff with 58.2% of the vote. Japanese in Hawaii are the state's second-largest ethnic group, and Amemiya would have been the first mayor of Honolulu of Japanese ancestry.

In 2025, JL Capital CEO Timothy Lee was indicted for allegedly contributing $13,000 under false names to Honolulu mayoral campaigns in 2020. Amemiya received $5,000 of those contributions and said he did not know about them.

==== Endorsements ====
- U.S. Senator Brian Schatz
- AFL–CIO
- Honolulu City Council members Anderson, Elefante, Manahan, Pine, and Waters
- Hawaii Government Employees Association

=== 2022 Hawaii lieutenant gubernatorial election ===
With 23.2% of the vote, Amemiya placed third in the 2022 Democratic primary election for Hawaii lieutenant governor and was thus eliminated.

== Personal life ==
Amemiya met his wife, Bonny (née Suzui), in 1995 when she was the CFO of a local fast food chain. They married in 1996 and have a son.
