= 2020 Honolulu mayoral election =

- August 8, 2020 (primary); November 3, 2020 (runoff)
- Turnout: 69.65% ▲
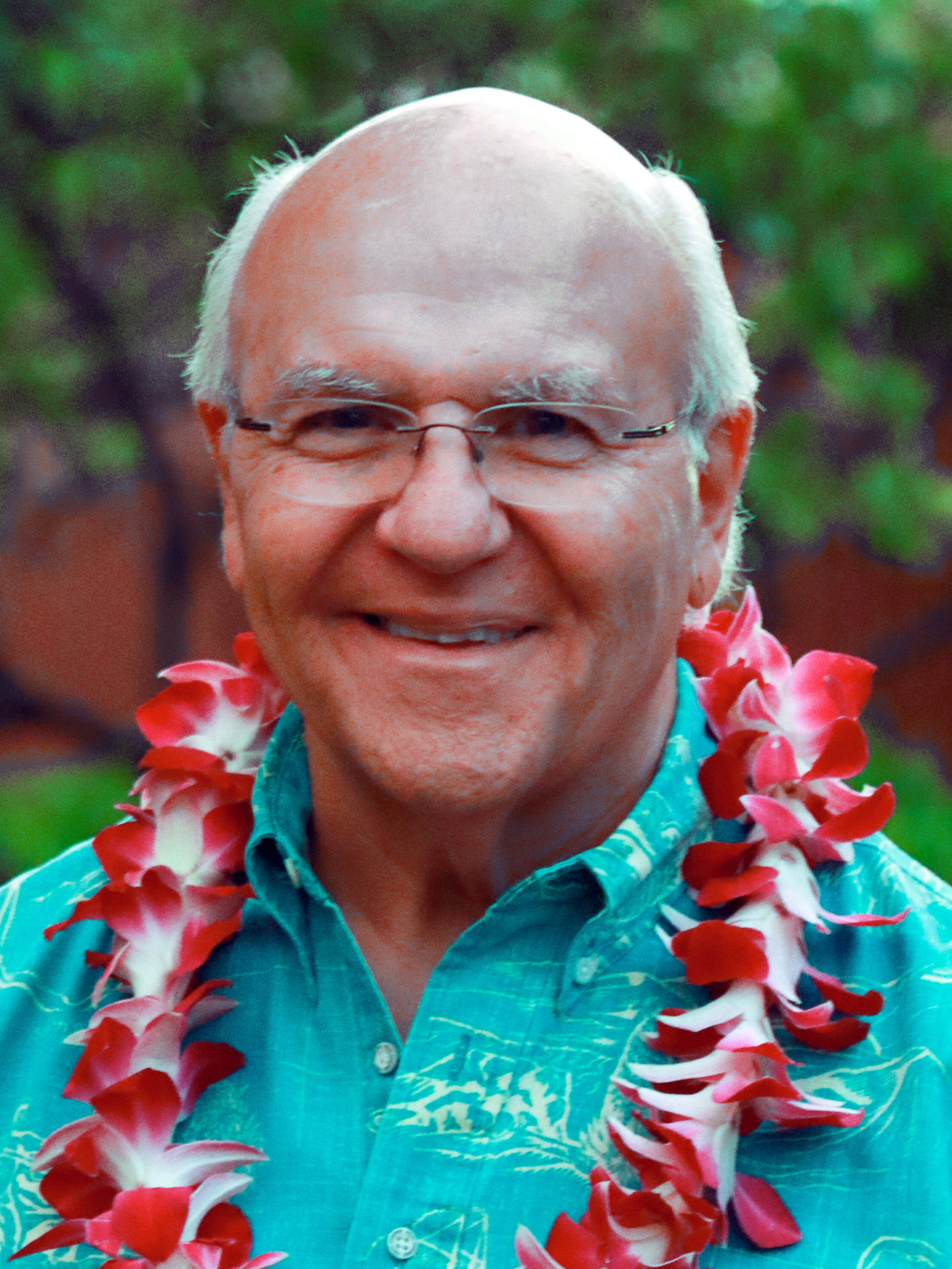

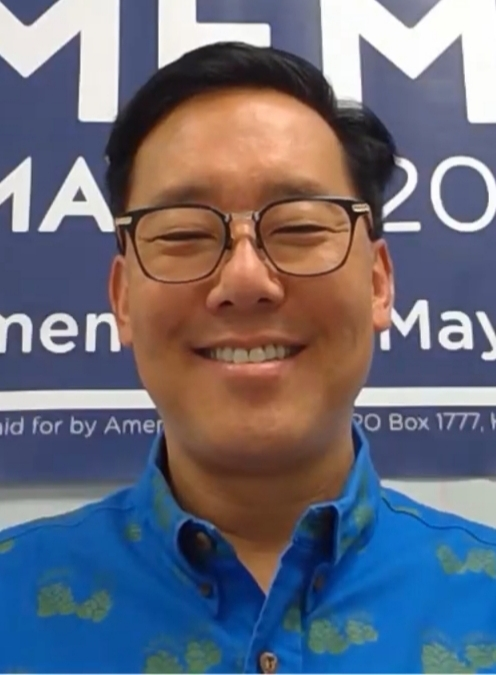

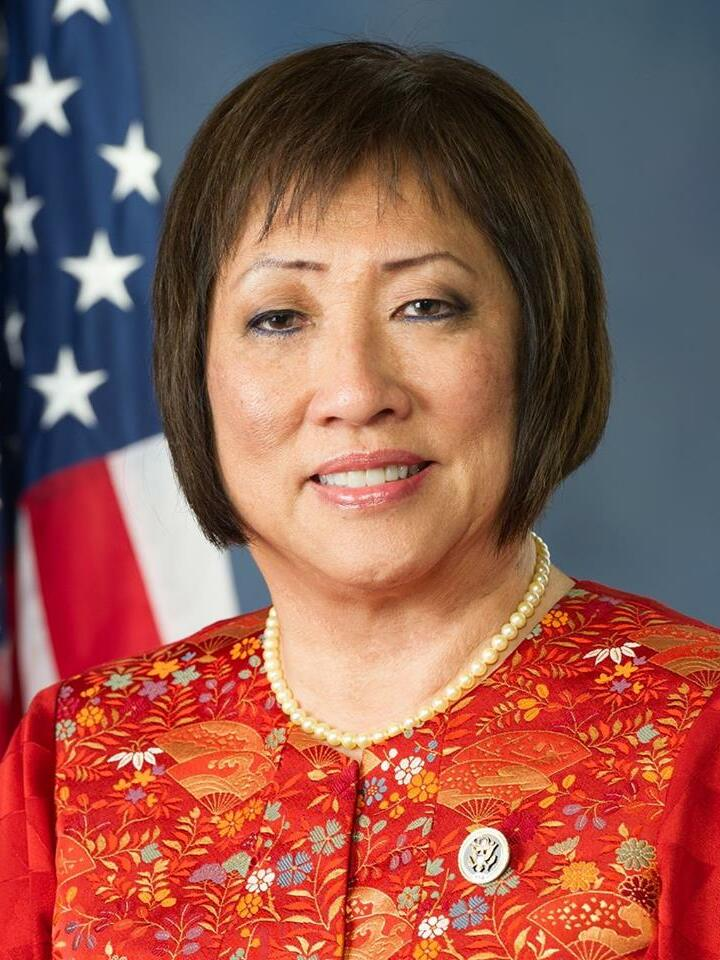

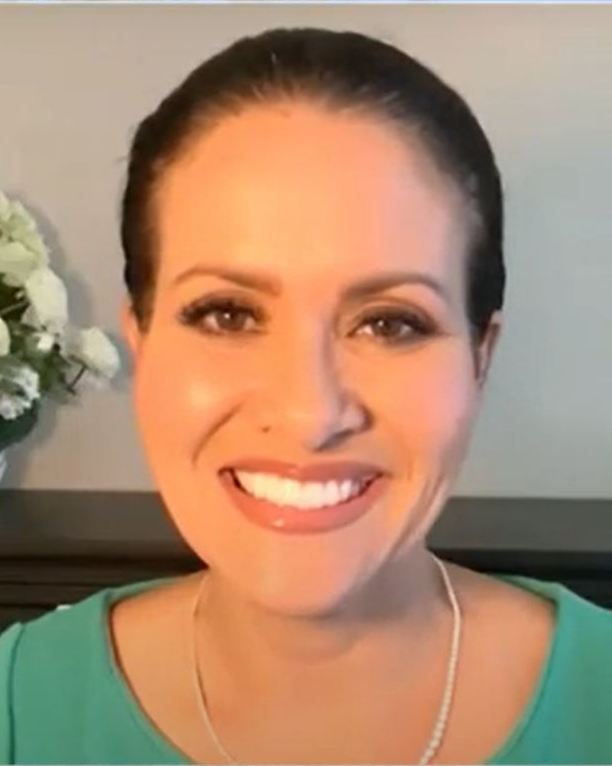

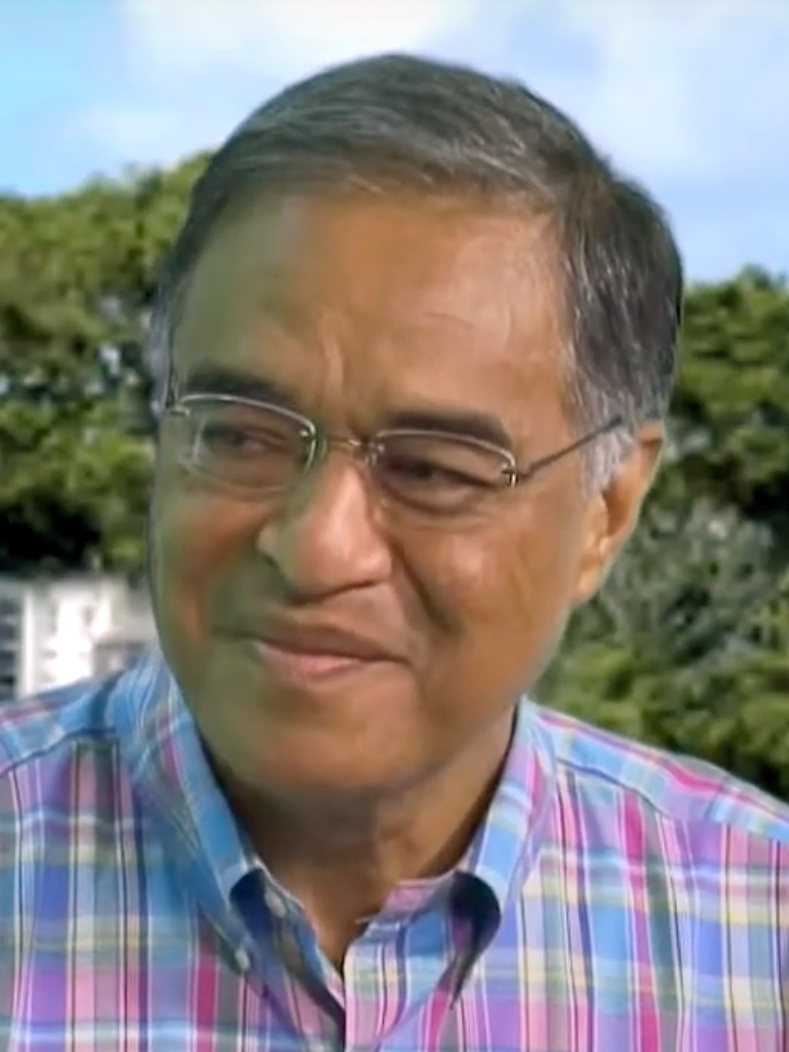

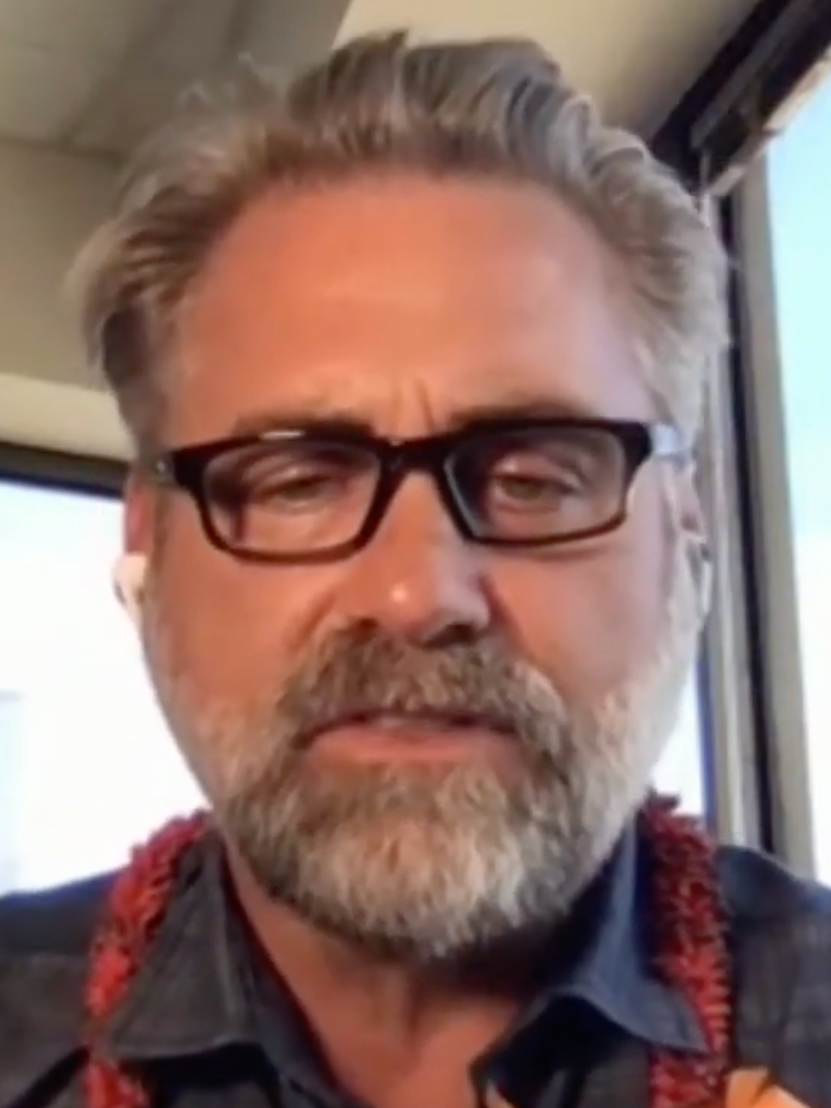
Candidate	Rick Blangiardi	Keith Amemiya	Colleen Hanabusa
Party	Nonpartisan	Nonpartisan	Nonpartisan
First round	69,510; 25.57%	55,002; 20.24%	50,120; 18.44%
Runoff	224,474; 58.2%	149,375; 38.8%	Eliminated
Candidate	Kymberly Pine	Mufi Hannemann	Bud Stonebreaker
Party	Nonpartisan	Nonpartisan	Nonpartisan
First round	40,008; 14.72%	26,975; 9.92%	17,710; 6.51%
Runoff	Eliminated	Eliminated	Eliminated
- Blangiardi: 10–20% 20–30% 30–40% 40–50% 50–60% 60–70% >90% Amemiya: 20–30% 30–40% 50–60% 60–70% Hanabusa: 10–20% 20–30% Pine: 10–20% 20–30% 30–40% Hannemann: 20–30% 40–50% James: 20–30% Tie: 20–30% 50% No votes
Mayor before election
Kirk Caldwell
Democratic
Elected mayor
Rick Blangiardi
Nonpartisan

The 2020 Honolulu mayoral election determined the mayor of the City and County of Honolulu for the term commencing in January 2021. Incumbent mayor Kirk Caldwell was ineligible to run for a third term due to term limits.

The position of mayor of Honolulu is non-partisan. A nonpartisan blanket primary was held on Saturday, August 8, 2020. With no candidate receiving an outright majority of the vote in the primary, the top two finishers, Rick Blangiardi and Keith Amemiya, advanced to a November general election runoff on Tuesday, November 3, 2020.

Rick Blangiardi won the general election, defeating Amemiya with 58.2% of all votes. The city and county also had a record turnout, with 385,442 total votes in the election being cast. Blangiardi was inaugurated as mayor on January 2, 2021.

== Candidates ==
=== Advanced to runoff ===
- Keith Amemiya, insurance executive and former executive director of Hawaii High School Athletic Association
- Rick Blangiardi, former University of Hawaii football coach, businessman, and television executive for Hawaii News Now

=== Eliminated during primary ===
- John Carroll, former state senator, nominee for U.S. Senate in 2000 and 2016, and candidate for governor of Hawaii in 2018
- Colleen Hanabusa, former U.S. representative for Hawaii's 1st congressional district (2011–2015; 2016–2019) (endorsed Blangiardi)
- Mufi Hannemann, former mayor of Honolulu, 2005–2010
- Choon James, real estate broker, candidate for Honolulu City Council, district 2 in 2018
- Audrey Keesing, Hawaii State President of the National Organization for Women, 1994–1999, participant U.N. 4th World Conference on Women. 1995 candidate for State House of Representatives, 1996, participant in the Native Hawaiian Federal Recognition: Joint Hearing
- Kymberly Pine, Honolulu City councilmember, district 1
- William "Bud" Stonebraker, pastor of South Shore Christian Fellowship, kalo farmer, former Hawaiʻi state representative (2000–2006)
- Ho Yin (Jason) Wong, former Chief Governance & Information Officer of an IaaS cloud computing technology company

=== Withdrew ===
- Ikaika Anderson, Honolulu City councilmember, district 3; council chair and presiding officer
- Marissa Kerns, 2018 Republican nominee for lieutenant governor of Hawaii
- Ron Menor, Honolulu City councilmember, district 9

=== Declined ===
- Charles Djou, former U.S. representative for Hawaii's 1st congressional district (2010–2011); candidate for mayor of Honolulu in 2016

== Endorsements ==
Keith Amemiya

Individuals

- Kymberly Pine, Honolulu city councilwoman and former mayoral candidate
- Brian Schatz, U.S. senator from Hawaii
- Dave Shoji, former coach of Rainbow Wahine Volleyball
- Antonio Taguba, retired U.S. Army major general

Unions

- Hawaii Government Employees Association (HGEA)
- Plumber and Fitters Local 675
- United Public Workers (UPW AFSCME, Local 646, AFL-CIO)
Rick Blangiardi

Unions

- State of Hawaii Organization of Police Officers (SHOPO), police union for the Honolulu Police Department

Individuals

- Colleen Hanabusa, former mayoral candidate; former U.S. representative for Hawaii's 1st congressional district (2011–2015; 2016–2019)
- Linda Lingle, former governor of Hawaii (2002–2010)
- Larry Price, former coach of Hawaii Rainbow Warriors football
Colleen Hanabusa (eliminated)

Hawaii politicians

- Ann Kobayashi, member and vice chair of Honolulu City Council

Unions

- Hawaii State Teachers Association (HSTA)
- International Longshore and Warehouse Union (ILWU) Local 142
- Laborers' International Union of North America Local 368
- Operating Engineers Local 3
Mufi Hannemann (eliminated)

Unions

- Hawaii Fire Fighters Association (HFFA) Local 1643
- Hawaii Teamsters and Allied Workers Local 996
- International Association of Bridge, Structural and Ornamental Iron Workers Union Local 625
- International Union of Bricklayers and Allied Craftworkers Local 1
- Operative Plasterers' & Cement Masons' International Association Local 630

== Primary ==
=== Polling ===
Poll source	Date(s) administered	Sample size	Margin of error	Keith Amemiya	Rick Blangiardi	Colleen Hanabusa	Mufi Hannemann	Kym Pine	Choon James	Another candidate	None of these/unsure
Honolulu Civil Beat/Hawaii News Now	May 18–20, 2020	1038	± 3.0%	10%	21%	15%	N/A	9%	3%	N/A	42%
Honolulu Star-Advertiser	July 20–22, 2020	400	± 5.0%	13%	21%	20%	10%	9%	N/A	7%	20%
Honolulu Civil Beat/Hawaii News Now	July 27–30, 2020	660	± 3.8%	15%	27%	15%	8%	12%	N/A	N/A	21%

=== Results ===
Honolulu mayoral primary election, August 8, 2020
Candidate	Votes	%
Rick Blangiardi	69,510	25.57%
Keith Amemiya	55,002	20.24%
Colleen Hanabusa	50,120	18.44%
Kymberly Pine	40,008	14.72%
Mufi Hannemann	26,975	9.92%
William "Bud" Stonebraker	17,710	6.51%
Choon James	5,520	2.03%
John Carroll	2,005	0.74%
Ho-Yin "Jason" Wong	1,434	0.53%
Ernest Caravalho	1,136	0.42%
Audrey Keesing	822	0.30%
Micah La'akea Mussell	538	0.20%
David "Duke" Bourgoin	367	0.14%
Karl O. Dicks	358	0.13%
Tim Garry	311	0.11%
Total votes	205,801	100%

== General election ==
=== Polling ===
Poll source	Date(s) administered	Sample size (Note: Key: A – all adults RV – registered voters LV – likely voters V – unclear)	Margin of error	Rick Blangiardi	Keith Amemiya	Other or undecided
Civil Beat/Hawaii News Now	October 2–7, 2020	699 (RV)	± 3.7%	48%	28%	24%
Solutions Pacific/Keith Amemiya (Note: Poll sponsored by Amemiya's campaign)	September 28 – October 9, 2020	1,212 (RV)	–	37%	36%	–
Mason-Dixon/Honolulu Star-Advertiser	October 12–14, 2020	625 (LV)	± 4%	49%	36%	15% (Note: Undecided with 15%)

=== Results ===
Honolulu mayoral general election, November 3, 2020
Candidate	Votes	%
Rick Blangiardi	224,474	58.2
Keith Amemiya	149,735	38.8
Blank votes	11,097	2.9
Over votes	136	0.0
Total votes	385,442	100

== See also ==
- 2020 Hawaii elections
