= 2024 Honolulu mayoral election =

- August 10, 2024
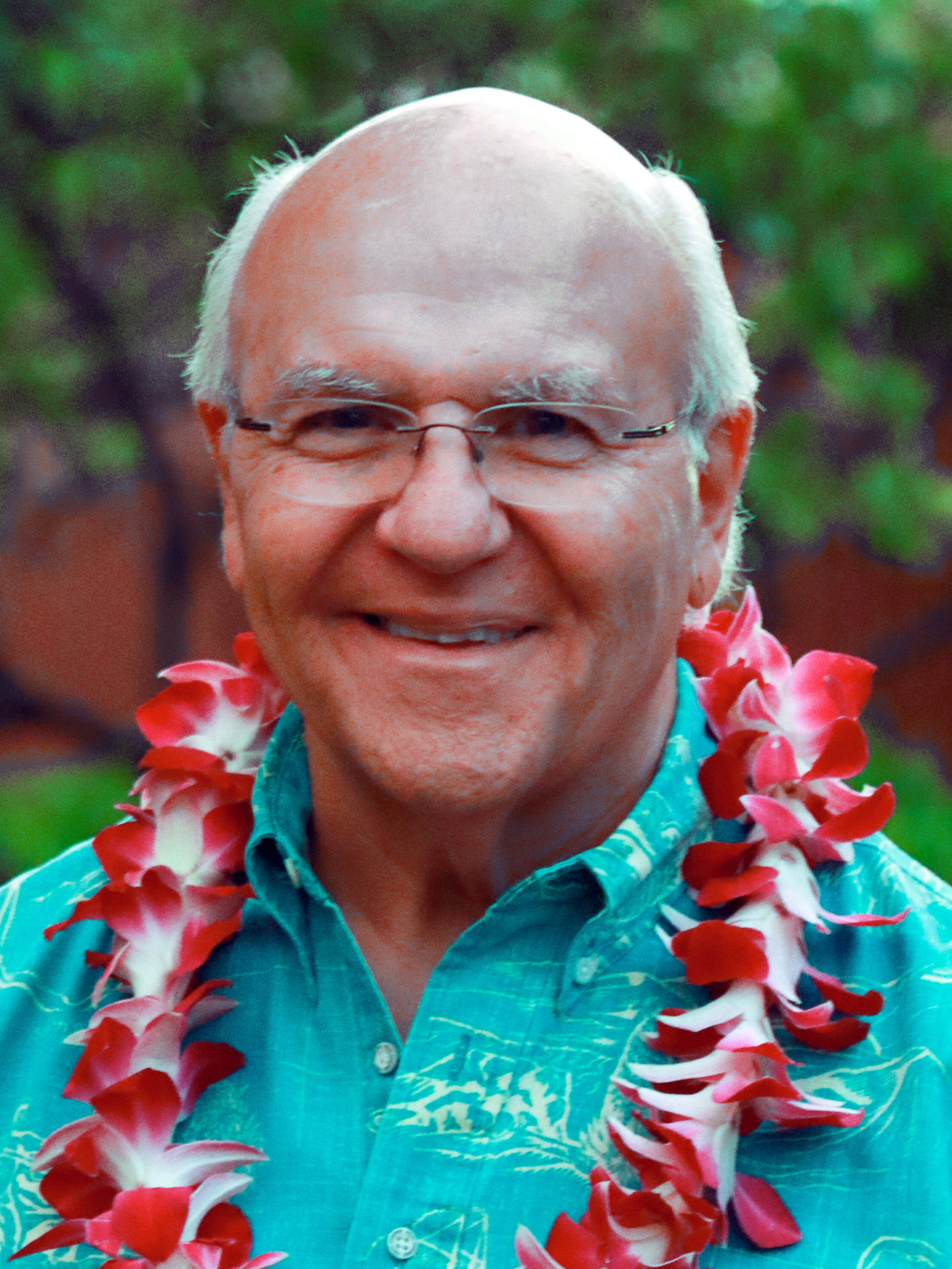

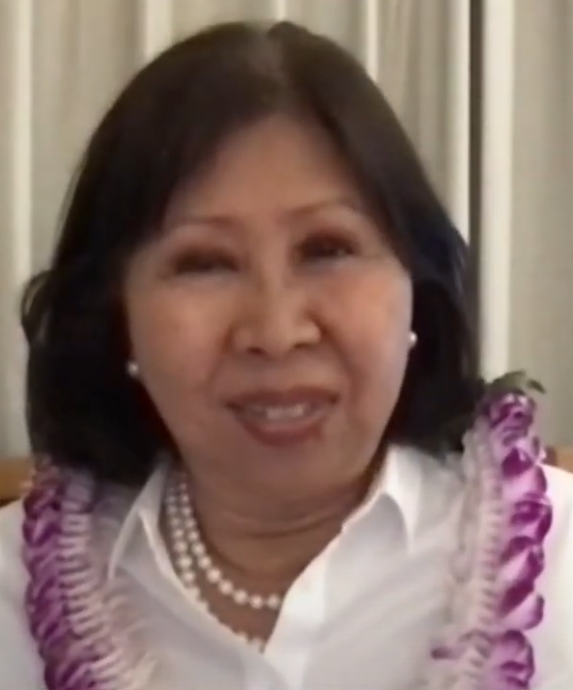
Candidate	Rick Blangiardi	Choon James
Popular vote	125,076	23,087
Percentage	78.0%	14.4%
- Precinct results Blangiardi: 50–60% 60–70% 70–80% 80–90% James: >90% No votes
Mayor before election
Rick Blangiardi
Elected mayor
Rick Blangiardi

The 2024 Honolulu mayoral election took place on August 10, 2024. Candidates included incumbent mayor Rick Blangiardi, Duke Bourgoin, Choon James and Karl Dicks. Mayor Blangiardi won re-election to a second term outright, avoiding a runoff election.

== Candidates ==
=== Declared ===
- Karl Dicks, mechanic and candidate for mayor in 2020
- Rick Blangiardi, incumbent mayor (Party affiliation: Independent)
- Duke Bourgoin, business consultant, candidate for mayor in 2020, and candidate for governor in 2022
- Choon James, real estate agent and candidate for mayor in 2020

== Endorsements ==
Rick Blangiardi

Statewide officials

- Linda Lingle, former governor of Hawaii (2002–2010) (Republican)

Labor unions

- International Association of Fire Fighters Local 1463
- American Federation of State, County and Municipal Employees Local 152
- AFL-CIO Hawaii
- General Contractors Association of Hawaii
- International Union of Operating Engineers Local 3
- International Union of Painters and Allied Trades District Council 50
- UNITE HERE Local 5
- United Association of Plumbers and Pipefitters Local 675
Declined to endorse

Labor unions

- American Federation of State, County and Municipal Employees Local 646

== Results ==
2024 Honolulu mayoral election
Candidate	Votes	%
Rick Blangiardi (incumbent)	125,076	78.0%
Choon James	23,087	14.4%
Duke Bourgoin	6,231	3.9%
Karl Dicks	5,908	3.7%
Total votes	160,302	100.0%
