= Karen Awana =

American politician

Member of the Hawaii House of Representatives from the 43rd district 44th (2006–2013)
- In office November 2006 – November 4, 2014
- Preceded by: Michael Kahikina
- Succeeded by: Andria Tupola

Personal details
- Party: Democratic (since 2007) (elected as a Republican from 2002-2006)

Karen Leinani Awana is an American politician and a former Democratic member of the Hawaii House of Representatives, representing District 43. Her term ended on November 4, 2014. Awana served consecutively from January 2007 until 2013 in the District 44 seat. Awana changed parties on December 19, 2007.

== Elections ==
- 2002 With Republican Representative Emily Auwae redistricted to District 45, Awana challenged incumbent Democratic Representative Michael Kahikina when she was unopposed for the District 44 September 21, 2002 Republican Primary, winning with 713 votes, but lost the November 5, 2002 General election to Kahikina.
- 2004 Awana and Representative Kahikina were both unopposed for their September 18, 2004 primaries, setting up a rematch; Awana lost the November 2, 2004 General election by 46 votes.
- 2006 Awana won the September 26, 2006 Republican Primary with 272 votes (59.0%), and Kahikina won his primary, setting up their third contest. Awana won the November 7, 2006 General election with 2,205 votes (51.5%) against Representative Kahikina.
- 2008 Having switched parties, Awana won the September 20, 2008 Democratic Primary by 60 votes with 1,072 votes (46.2%), and won the November 4, 2008 General election with 4,373 votes (74.3%) against Republican nominee Tercia Ku, who had lost to Awana in the 2006 Republican Primary.
- 2010 Awana won the four-way September 18, 2010 Democratic Primary with 1,234 votes (44.8%), and was unopposed for the November 2, 2010 General election.
- 2012 Redistricted to District 43, and with Republican Representative Kymberly Pine running for Honolulu City Council, Awana won the four-way August 11, 2012 Democratic Primary, winning with 1,197 votes (43.9%), and won the November 6, 2012 General election with 4,029 votes (69.7%) against Republican nominee Glenn Butler.
- 2014 With 1,388 votes (53.7%), Awana won the August 9, 2014 Democratic Primary. However, she lost the November 4, 2014 General election with 2,096 votes (41.6%) against Republican nominee Andria Tupola. The year prior, Awana was fined $8,500 for failing to disclose campaign expenditures.

== See also ==
- List of American politicians who switched parties in office
