= Bode Uale =

American judge

- Education: Brigham Young University–Hawaii (BA); University of Hawaii (JD)
- Spouse: Beth Parker
- Children: 4, including Andria Tupola

Bode Amilale Uale is a retired American judge. On his appointment at age 36 in 1991, he became the first family court judge appointed in the United States who was of Samoan descent. Uale served as the lead judge of the Honolulu Family Court's Domestic Division. He retired in December 2020.

== Early life and education ==
He was raised in Laie, Hawaii and graduated in 1979 from Brigham Young University–Hawaii with a degree in political science. He later earned a Juris Doctor in 1984 from the University of Hawaiʻi.

== Career ==
He worked as a public defender from 1984 to 1989 and practiced private law from 1989 to 1991. He was appointed as a family court judge by Chief Justice Herman Lum in 1991. His current assignment is as Lead Judge of the Domestic Division of the Honolulu Family Court. He is also an advisory board member for the “Imi Ho’ola” Minority Admissions Program for the School of Medicine at the University of Hawaii. He participates in an innovative family drug court program that helps parents put their families back together.

== Personal life ==
Aside from his position as a judge, Uale has served as the president of the Honolulu Stake of the Church of Jesus Christ of Latter-day Saints.

Uale and his wife Beth are the parents of four children, most notably Andria Tupola. Beth was recognized as Hawaii mother of the year in 2004.

Uale's grandfather immigrated from Samoa to Hawaii in 1917 and helped construct the Church College of Hawaii (now BYU-Hawaii) and the Polynesian Cultural Center.
