= Rick Blangiardi =

American business executive and politician

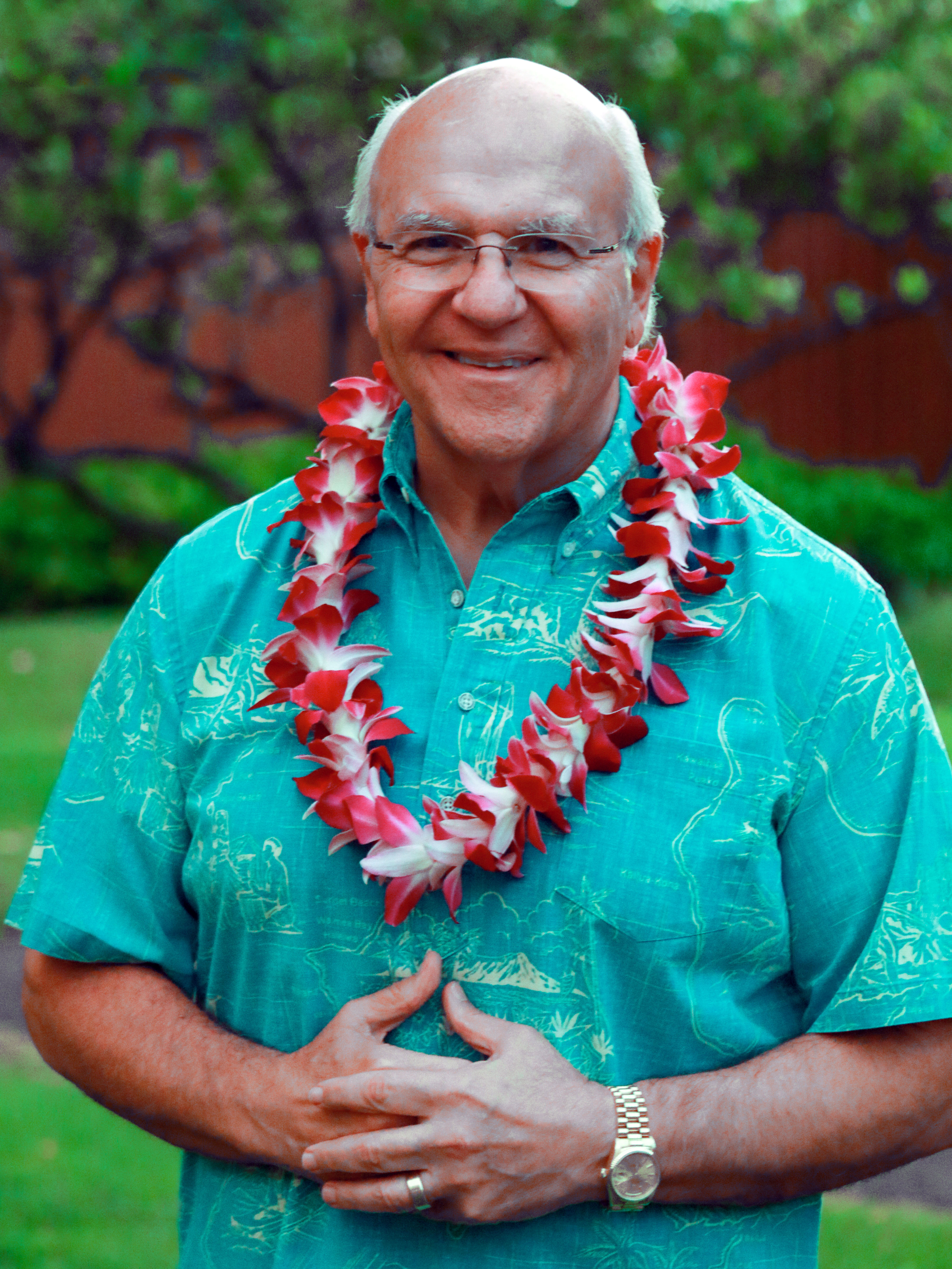
- Blangiardi in 2022

15th Mayor of Honolulu
- Incumbent
- Assumed office January 2, 2021
- Preceded by: Kirk Caldwell

Personal details
- Born: Richard John Blangiardi; September 15, 1946 (age 79) Cambridge, Massachusetts, U.S.
- Party: Independent
- Spouse(s): Kathleen Franklin (div. 1991) Karen Chang (m. 2018)
- Children: 3
- Education: Springfield College (BS); University of Hawaiʻi at Mānoa (MA)
- Website: Official website
- Coaching career

Playing career
- 1965–1966: Hawaii
- 1967–1968: Springfield (MA)
- Position: Linebacker

Coaching career (HC unless noted)
- 1972–1973: Hawaii (LB)
- 1974–1976: Hawaii (AHC/DC)

Richard John Blangiardi (born September 15, 1946) is an American television executive and politician from Hawaii. Blangiardi was elected mayor of Honolulu in 2020 and took office on January 2, 2021. He previously worked in the television industry and helped consolidate KHNL and KGMB into Hawaii News Now. Blangiardi was reelected in 2024.

A political independent, Blangiardi describes himself as socially liberal and fiscally conservative.

== Early life and career ==
Blangiardi was born on September 15, 1946, in Cambridge, Massachusetts, and was raised there in a tenement. He signed a letter of intent to play college football for Boston College, but when his father, a munitions expert in the United States Navy, was transferred to Naval Station Pearl Harbor, he chose to attend the University of Hawaiʻi at Mānoa. Blangiardi played football for the Hawaii Rainbow Warriors as a linebacker; he was a letterman for the Rainbow Warriors in 1965 and 1966.

When his mother moved back to Massachusetts, Blangiardi transferred to Springfield College, where he earned his Bachelor of Science in physical education and biology in 1969. From 1972 to 1976, he served as an assistant coach for the Rainbow Warriors under head coaches Dave Holmes and Larry Price. Blangiardi was the defensive coordinator and associate head coach under Price. He earned a Master of Arts in educational administration at the University of Hawaiʻi in 1973.

== Television career ==
Needing more income to raise his family, Blangiardi left football to work in television. He worked at KGMB from 1977 to 1984. He was vice president and general manager of KIKU (now KHNL) from 1984 to 1989. Blangiardi left Hawaii to become the general manager of KING-TV in Seattle in October 1989. He was fired in February 1992, when the station was sold to new owners. CBS hired him as vice president of new business in June 1992.

In 1993, he became vice president and general manager at KPIX-TV in San Francisco. He was hired as president of River City Broadcasting in St. Louis in 1994, and after its sale to Sinclair Broadcast Group, became the chief executive officer of the Premier Horse Network in 1997. He worked as chief operating officer and managing director of the talent firm Brad Marks International in 1999, and was hired that year by Telemundo to oversee its eight affiliates.

In 2002, Blangiardi returned to Hawaii as the senior vice president and general manager of KHON-TV and KGMB. He left KHON in 2006 when Emmis Communications sold the station. After the Great Recession, Blangiardi led the consolidation of KGMB and KHNL into Hawaii News Now.

== Political career ==
In January 2020, Blangiardi announced his retirement from television. The next month, he announced his candidacy in the 2020 Honolulu mayoral election. He was endorsed by former Republican governor Linda Lingle, the University of Hawaiʻi Professional Assembly, and the State of Hawaii Organization of Police Officers (SHOPO) (the Honolulu Police Department's police union).

In the August 8 nonpartisan blanket primary, Blangiardi finished first with 25.7% of the vote. He defeated Keith Amemiya, 58.2% to 38.8%, in the November general election, and was sworn into office on January 2, 2021.

=== Mayor of Honolulu ===
==== 2021 State of the City ====
Blangiardi delivered his first State of the City address on March 15, 2021. He outlined his agenda and goals for the city, as well as his budget plan and accomplishments so far. His outlined goals included expanding affordable housing, closing the funding gap in the Honolulu Rail Project, lifting pandemic restrictions, revitalizing the city's Chinatown, and protecting the city from the effects of climate change.

==== Budget ====
Blangiardi presented a $2.9 billion budget to the City Council on March 2, 2022. One of the goals was to ensure city workers would be protected from pay cuts or reductions. Blangiardi had to make budget cuts due to deficits created by a lack of revenue during the COVID-19 pandemic.

==== Gun safety ====
On March 31, 2023, Blangiardi signed a bill into law that established "gun-free" locations to prevent concealed-carry at a number of public places. At the signing ceremony, he said, "We're not a gun carrying society and we're not gonna do anything that's gonna condone that."

==== Historic preservation ====
In April 2023, Blangiardi announced candidates for the Oahu Historic Preservation Commission, which was established to preserve historic landmarks in Oahu. Legislation for the commission was passed in 1990, but commissioners were not appointed until 2023, when city council members Esther Kia'āina and Tommy Waters reintroduced it. The Commission is responsible for protecting and developing guidelines and regulations for the preservation of historic sites in Oahu.

==== 2024 election and campaign ====
Blangiardi announced in early 2023 that he would run for reelection.

In August 2023, Blangiardi was reported to have raised $600,000 for reelection efforts, according to his campaign disclosures with the state Campaign Spending Commission. He held few campaign fundraisers or events and said, "We're focused on the work. Job performance is what gets you reelected." Blangiardi won a second term outright in the August 10 primary election with 79% of the vote. His closest challenger, Choon James, received 13%.

==== COVID-19 policy ====
In the fourth quarter of 2021 and the first quarter of 2022, Blangiardi began to focus his attention on Honolulu's COVID restrictions. One of his first COVID-related policies was a vaccine passport and mandate called "Safe Access O'ahu", implemented in October 2021. It mandated that most indoor venues require vaccination for all patrons and employees. Blangiardi also implemented quotas on the number of people allowed at gatherings: 10 for indoor events and 25 for outdoor events. There was some support for this policy, but several groups, including airline attendants, first responders, and the Aloha Freedom Coalition, strongly opposed it.

About two months after the "Safe Access O'ahu" and gathering restrictions went into effect, Blangiardi began to walk them back. In November 2021, it was announced that capacity restrictions on businesses would be lifted for patrons with proof of being COVID-negative at most 48 hours before their visit. Blangiardi received some backlash for easing the policy due to an increase of COVID cases as a result of the then-surging Omicron variant.

== Political views ==
Blangiardi has been described as conservative and in 2004 and 2005 donated to George W. Bush and the Republican Party, respectively, but he is not a registered Republican and is labeled an independent.

Blangiardi voted for Donald Trump in the 2016 presidential election, and said, "I think a lot of his policies, despite his personal antics, have been effective". He also said that he has voted for both Democrats and Republicans in the past.

== Personal life ==
Blangiardi has three children and his mayor's office biography notes six grandchildren. He lives with his wife Karen Chang in Honolulu. Blangiardi has held leadership positions for various public service organizations, among them the YMCA, American Red Cross, and a Hawaii food bank. He grew up in an immigrant household speaking Italian and English.

Political offices
Preceded by Kirk Caldwell	Mayor of Honolulu; 2021–present	Incumbent
