= Michael Kahikina =

American politician

Member of the Hawaii House of Representatives from the 44th district
- In office January 15, 2003 – January 17, 2007
- Preceded by: Emily Auwae
- Succeeded by: Karen Awana

Member of the Hawaii House of Representatives from the 43rd district
- In office January 18, 1995 – January 15, 2003
- Preceded by: Henry H. Peters
- Succeeded by: Romy Mindo

Personal details
- Born: Michael Puamamo Kahikina; January 16, 1950 (age 76) Honolulu, Hawaii
- Party: Democratic

Michael Kahikina (born January 16, 1950) is an American politician who served in the Hawaii House of Representatives from 1995 to 2007.

== Political positions ==
When Vote Smart asked him about his political positions in 2004, he answered "Yes" to "Do you support limiting the following types of contributions to state legislative and gubernatorial candidates?" when it came to "Individual," "PAC," "Corporate," and "Political Parties," and he answered "No" to "Should Hawaii recognize civil unions between same-sex couples?"
