= 2018 Hawaii gubernatorial election =

- November 6, 2018
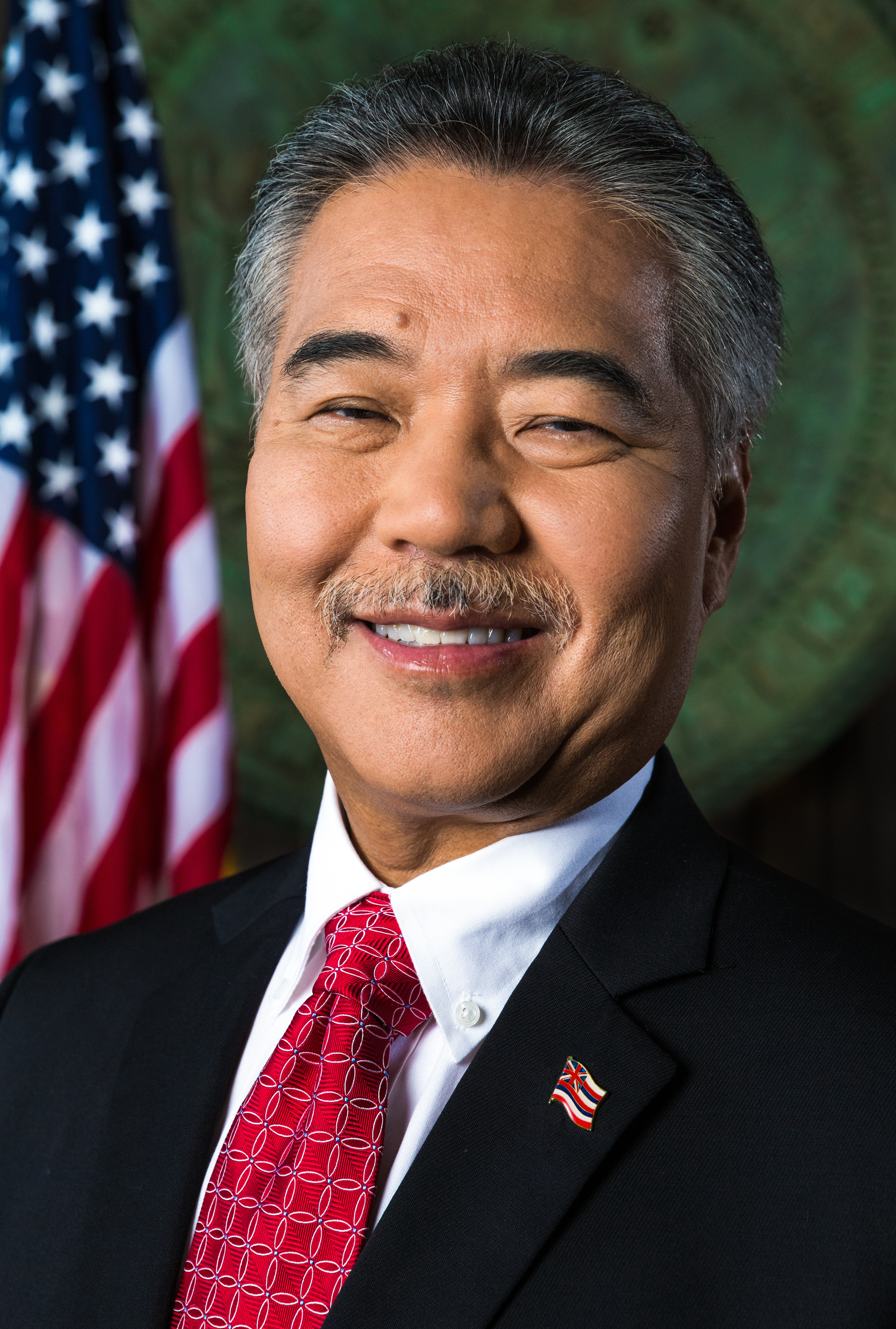

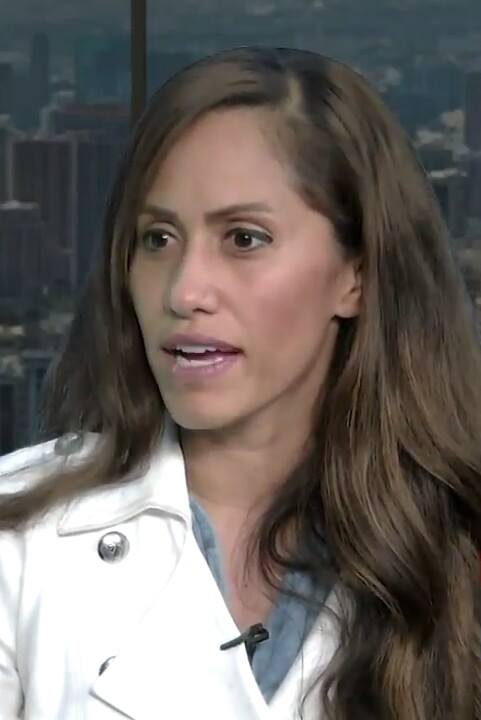
Nominee	David Ige	Andria Tupola
Party	Democratic	Republican
Running mate	Josh Green	Marissa Kerns
Popular vote	244,934	131,719
Percentage	62.67%	33.70%
- Ige: 40–50% 50–60% 60–70% 70–80% 80–90% Tupola: 40–50% 50–60% 60–70% 70–80% Tie: 40–50% No votes
Governor before election
David Ige
Democratic
Elected Governor
David Ige
Democratic

The 2018 Hawaii gubernatorial election took place on November 6, 2018, to elect the governor of Hawaii and lieutenant governor of Hawaii.

After prevailing in an intensely competitive primary election on August 11, 2018, incumbent Democratic governor David Ige ran successfully for re-election to a second term in office, considerably improving on his margin of victory from 2014, in which he only won a plurality.

Republicans Andria Tupola and Marissa Kerns headed one of two 2018 major-party gubernatorial tickets that included two women. The other such ticket had Idaho's 2018 Democratic nominees for governor and lieutenant governor, Paulette Jordan and Kristin Collum. This was Hawaii's only gubernatorial election since 1994 without Linda Lingle or Duke Aiona as the Republican nominee, as well as the first since the 1990 election in which the winner was of a different party than the incumbent president. This was also the first time since 1998 that a Democratic governor of Hawaii was re-elected.

== Democratic primary ==
=== Governor ===
==== Candidates ====
===== Declared =====
- Ernest Caravalho, Democratic Party of Hawaii chair, House District 29
- Colleen Hanabusa, U.S. representative and candidate for the U.S. Senate in 2014
- David Ige, incumbent governor
- Wendell Kaehuaea, security guard and perennial candidate
- Van Tanabe

===== Withdrew =====
- Clayton Hee, former state senator and candidate for lieutenant governor in 2014

==== Debates ====
Dates	Location	Ige	Hanabusa	Link
July 6, 2018	Honolulu, Hawaii	Participant	Participant	Full debate – YouTube

==== Endorsements ====
Colleen Hanabusa

Individuals

- Ben Cayetano, former governor of Hawai'i
- Tulsi Gabbard, congresswoman for HI-2
- Shan Tsutsui, former lieutenant governor of Hawai'i

Organizations

- Hawaii Building and Construction Trades Council
- Hawaii Fire Fighters Association
- Hawaii Government Employees Association
- Hawaii Regional Council of Carpenters
- Hawaii State AFL-CIO
- International Longshore and Warehouse Union (ILWU)
- International Union of Operating Engineers
- International Union of Painters and Associated Trades
- Laborers' International Union of North America
- Seafarers International Union
- State of Hawaii Organization of Police Officers
- University of Hawaii Professional Assembly
- The Maui News
David Ige

Individuals

- Harry Kim, mayor of Hawai'i County

Organizations

- Hawaii Association of Public Accountants
- Hawaii State Teachers Association (HSTA)
- Ironworkers Union
- Plasterers & Cement Masons Union
- Unite Here Local 5
- United Public Workers

==== Polling ====
Poll source	Date(s) administered	Sample size	Margin of error	David Ige	Colleen Hanabusa	Clayton Hee	Undecided
Merriman River Group	July 19–21, 2018	871	± 3.3%	43%	34%	–	18%
Mason-Dixon	July 6–11, 2018	494	± 4.5%	44%	40%	–	16%
QMark Research (D-Hanabusa)	June 21 – July 6, 2018	518	± 4.4%	31%	57%	–	11%
QMark Research (D-Hanabusa)	April 21 – May 7, 2018	888	± 3.4%	23%	52%	6%	19%
Merriman River Group	May 3–5, 2018	707	± 3.7%	31%	37%	11%	16%
Mason-Dixon	March 13–18, 2018	498	± 4.5%	27%	47%	11%	15%

==== Results ====
Results by county: Ige—50–60% Ige—40–50% Hanabusa—40–50% No data

Democratic primary results
Party	Candidate	Votes	%
Democratic	David Ige (incumbent)	124,572	51.4
Democratic	Colleen Hanabusa	107,631	44.4
Democratic	Ernest Caravalho	5,662	2.3
Democratic	Wendell Ka'ehu'ae'a	2,298	0.9
Democratic	Richard Kim	1,576	0.6
Democratic	Van Tanabe	775	0.3
Total votes		242,514	100.0

=== Lieutenant governor ===
==== Candidates ====
===== Declared =====
- Bernard Carvalho, mayor of Kauaʻi County
- Will Espero, State Senate vice president and candidate for HI-01 in 2014
- Josh Green, state senator
- Kim Coco Iwamoto, former state board of education member
- Jill Tokuda, state senator

==== Withdrew ====
- Alan Arakawa, mayor of Maui County (running for Maui County Council)

==== Endorsements ====
Josh Green

Organizations

- Hawaii State Teachers Association (HSTA)
- Hawaii Regional Council of Carpenters
- The Maui News
Kim Coco Iwamoto

Organizations

- UNITE Here Local 5
- Democratic Socialists of Honolulu
- LGBTQ Victory Fund

Individuals

- Daniel Foley, attorney in Baehr v. Miike and retired judge of the Hawaii Intermediate Court of Appeals
Jill Tokuda

Organizations

- University of Hawaii Professional Assembly
- International Longshore and Warehouse Union (ILWU) Local 142

Individuals

- U.S. Senator Mazie Hirono

==== Polling ====
Poll source	Date(s) administered	Sample size	Margin of error	Bernard Carvalho	Will Espero	Josh Green	Kim Coco Iwamoto	Jill Tokuda	Undecided
Merriman River Group	July 19–21, 2018	871	± 3.3%	13%	5%	31%	10%	17%	26%
Mason-Dixon	July 6–11, 2018	494	± 4.5%	14%	6%	34%	10%	14%	22%
Merriman River Group	May 3–5, 2018	707	± 3.7%	19%	8%	16%	14%	11%	32%
Mason-Dixon	March 13–18, 2018	498	± 4.5%	14%	9%	19%	5%	12%	41%

==== Results ====
Results by county: Green—50–60% Green—30–40% Tokuda—30–40% Carvalho—40–50% No data

Democratic primary results
Party	Candidate	Votes	%
Democratic	Josh Green	74,845	31.4
Democratic	Jill Tokuda	68,124	28.6
Democratic	Bernard Carvalho	45,825	19.2
Democratic	Kim Coco Iwamoto	34,243	14.3
Democratic	Will Espero	15,463	6.5
Total votes		238,500	100.0

== Republican primary ==
=== Governor ===
==== Candidates ====
===== Declared =====
- John Carroll, former state representative, and former state senator
- Ray L'Heureux, president and chairman of the Education Institute of Hawaii, former assistant superintendent, and retired U.S. Marine colonel
- Andria Tupola, Minority Leader of the Hawaii House of Representatives

===== Withdrew =====
- Bob McDermott, state representative and nominee for HI-02 in 2002

==== Endorsements ====
Andria Tupola

Newspapers

- Maui Time

==== Polling ====
Poll source	Date(s) administered	Sample size	Margin of error	John Carroll	Raymond L'Heureux	Andria Tupola	Undecided
Merriman River Group	July 19–21, 2018	219	± 6.6%	22%	4%	39%	22%
Mason-Dixon	July 6–11, 2018	143	± 8.4%	28%	8%	41%	23%
Mason-Dixon	March 13–18, 2018	134	± 8.6%	40%	–	28%	32%

==== Results ====
Results by county: Tupola—50–60% Tupola—40–50% No data

Republican primary results
Party	Candidate	Votes	%
Republican	Andria Tupola	17,297	55.5
Republican	John Carroll	10,974	35.2
Republican	Ray L'Heureux	2,885	9.3
Total votes		31,156	100.0

=== Lieutenant governor ===
==== Candidates ====
===== Declared =====
- Marissa Kerns
- Steve Lipscomb
- Jeremy Low

==== Polling ====
Poll source	Date(s) administered	Sample size	Margin of error	Marissa Kerns	Jeremy Low	Undecided
Merriman River Group	July 19–21, 2018	219	± 6.6%	26%	20%	54%

==== Results ====
Results by county: Kerns—30–40% Lipscomb—30–40% Tie—30–40% No data

Republican primary results
Party	Candidate	Votes	%
Republican	Marissa Dipasupil Kerns	9,758	35.4
Republican	Steve Lipscomb	9,543	34.7
Republican	Jeremy Low	8,232	29.9
Total votes		27,533	100.0

== Green primary ==
=== Governor ===
==== Candidates ====
===== Declared =====
- Jim Brewer

==== Results ====
Results by county: Brewer—100% No data

Green primary results
Party	Candidate	Votes	%
Green	Jim Brewer	454	100.0
Total votes		454	100.0

=== Lieutenant governor ===
==== Candidates ====
===== Declared =====
- Renee Ing

==== Results ====
Results by county: Ing—100% No data

Green primary results
Party	Candidate	Votes	%
Green	Renee Ing	444	100.0
Total votes		444	100.0

== Nonpartisan primary ==
=== Governor ===
==== Candidates ====
===== Declared =====
- Selina Blackwell
- Link El
- Terrence Teruya

===== Results =====
Results by county: Teruya—50–60% Blackwell—40–50% Blackwell—50–60% No data

Nonpartisan primary results
Party	Candidate	Votes	%
Nonpartisan	Terrence Teruya	543	47.7
Nonpartisan	Selina Blackwell	497	43.7
Nonpartisan	Link El	98	8.6
Total votes		1,138	100.0

=== Lieutenant governor ===
==== Candidates ====
===== Declared =====
- Ernest Magaoay
- Paul Robotti

===== Results =====
Results by county: Robotti—50–60% Magaoay—50–60% No data

Nonpartisan primary results
Party	Candidate	Votes	%
Nonpartisan	Paul Robotti	536	50.6
Nonpartisan	Ernest Magaoay	523	49.4
Total votes		1,059	100.0

== General election ==
=== Predictions ===
Source	Ranking	As of
The Cook Political Report	Safe D	October 26, 2018
The Washington Post	Safe D	November 5, 2018
FiveThirtyEight	Safe D	November 5, 2018
Rothenberg Political Report	Safe D	November 1, 2018
Sabato's Crystal Ball	Safe D	November 5, 2018
RealClearPolitics	Safe D	November 4, 2018
Daily Kos	Safe D	November 5, 2018
Fox News (Note: The Fox News Midterm Power Rankings uniquely does not contain a category for Safe/Solid races)	Likely D	November 5, 2018
Politico	Safe D	November 5, 2018
Governing	Safe D	November 5, 2018

=== Debates ===
Dates	Location	Ige	Tupola	Link
October 29, 2018	Honolulu, Hawaii	Participant	Participant	Full debate – C-SPAN

=== Polling ===
Poll source	Date(s) administered	Sample size	Margin of error	David Ige (D)	Andria Tupola (R)	Undecided
Merriman River Group	October 8–12, 2018	961	± 4.3%	52%	31%	11%
Mason-Dixon	July 6–11, 2018	800	± 3.5%	57%	34%	9%
Mason-Dixon	March 13–18, 2018	800	± 3.5%	51%	24%	25%

Hypothetical polling

with David Ige and John Carroll

Poll source	Date(s) administered	Sample size	Margin of error	David Ige (D)	John Carroll (R)	Undecided
Mason-Dixon	July 6–11, 2018	800	± 3.5%	62%	23%	15%
Mason-Dixon	March 13–18, 2018	800	± 3.5%	52%	27%	21%

with David Ige and Raymond L'Heureux

Poll source	Date(s) administered	Sample size	Margin of error	David Ige (D)	Raymond L'Heureux (R)	Undecided
Mason-Dixon	July 6–11, 2018	800	± 3.5%	67%	20%	13%

with Colleen Hanabusa and John Carroll

Poll source	Date(s) administered	Sample size	Margin of error	Colleen Hanabusa (D)	John Carroll (R)	Undecided
Mason-Dixon	July 6–11, 2018	800	± 3.5%	51%	31%	18%
Mason-Dixon	March 13–18, 2018	800	± 3.5%	57%	31%	12%

with Colleen Hanabusa and Andria Tupola

Poll source	Date(s) administered	Sample size	Margin of error	Colleen Hanabusa (D)	Andria Tupola (R)	Undecided
Mason-Dixon	July 6–11, 2018	800	± 3.5%	48%	35%	17%
Mason-Dixon	March 13–18, 2018	800	± 3.5%	56%	28%	16%

with Colleen Hanabusa and Raymond L'Heureux

Poll source	Date(s) administered	Sample size	Margin of error	Colleen Hanabusa (D)	Raymond L'Heureux (R)	Undecided
Mason-Dixon	July 6–11, 2018	800	± 3.5%	58%	26%	16%

=== Results ===
2018 Hawaii gubernatorial election
Party	Candidate	Votes	%	±%
Democratic	David Ige (incumbent)	244,934	62.67%	▲13.22
Republican	Andria Tupola	131,719	33.70%	▼3.38
Green	Jim Brewer	10,123	2.59%	N/A
Nonpartisan	Terrence Teruya	4,067	1.04%	N/A
Total votes		390,843	100.00%	N/A
Democratic hold				

==== By county ====
By county

County	David Ige Democratic		Andria Tupola Republican		All Others	
County	#	%	#	%	#	%
Hawaii	38,301	65.34%	17,953	30.63%	2,363	4.03%
Honolulu	158,623	61.46%	90,929	35.23%	8,528	3.3%
Kauaʻi	15,868	63.9%	8,135	32.76%	830	3.35%
Maui	32,142	65.18%	14,702	29.81%	2,469	5.01%
Totals	244,934	62.67%	131,719	33.7%	14,190	3.63%

==== By congressional district ====
Ige won both congressional districts.

District	Ige	Tupola	Representative
1st	64%	33%	Colleen Hanabusa (117th Congress)
1st	64%	33%	Ed Case (118th Congress)
2nd	61%	35%	Tulsi Gabbard
