= 2020 Hawaii elections =

- November 3, 2020

A general election was held in the U.S. state of Hawaii on November 3, 2020. Paper ballots for voting by mail were sent to all registered voters in the state.

== State offices ==
=== Hawaii Senate ===
14 out of the 25 seats in the Hawaii Senate were up for election. Out of the contested seats, the Democrats won 13 seats while the Republicans won one seat. The resulting composition was 24 Democrats and one Republican. No seats changed hands.

=== Hawaii House of Representatives ===
All of the 51 seats in the Hawaii House of Representatives were up for election. The Democrats won 47 seats and the Republicans won four seats. The Democrats gained one seat, District 50.

== Federal offices ==
=== President of the United States ===
Hawaii had four electoral votes in the Electoral College. Democrat Joe Biden won all of them, with 64% of the popular vote.

=== United States House of Representatives ===
Hawaii had two representatives in the United States House of Representatives. The Democratic Party won all the districts. No seats changed hands.

== See also ==
- Elections in Hawaii
- Politics of Hawaii
- Political party strength in Hawaii
