= 2000 United States Senate election in Hawaii =

- November 7, 2000
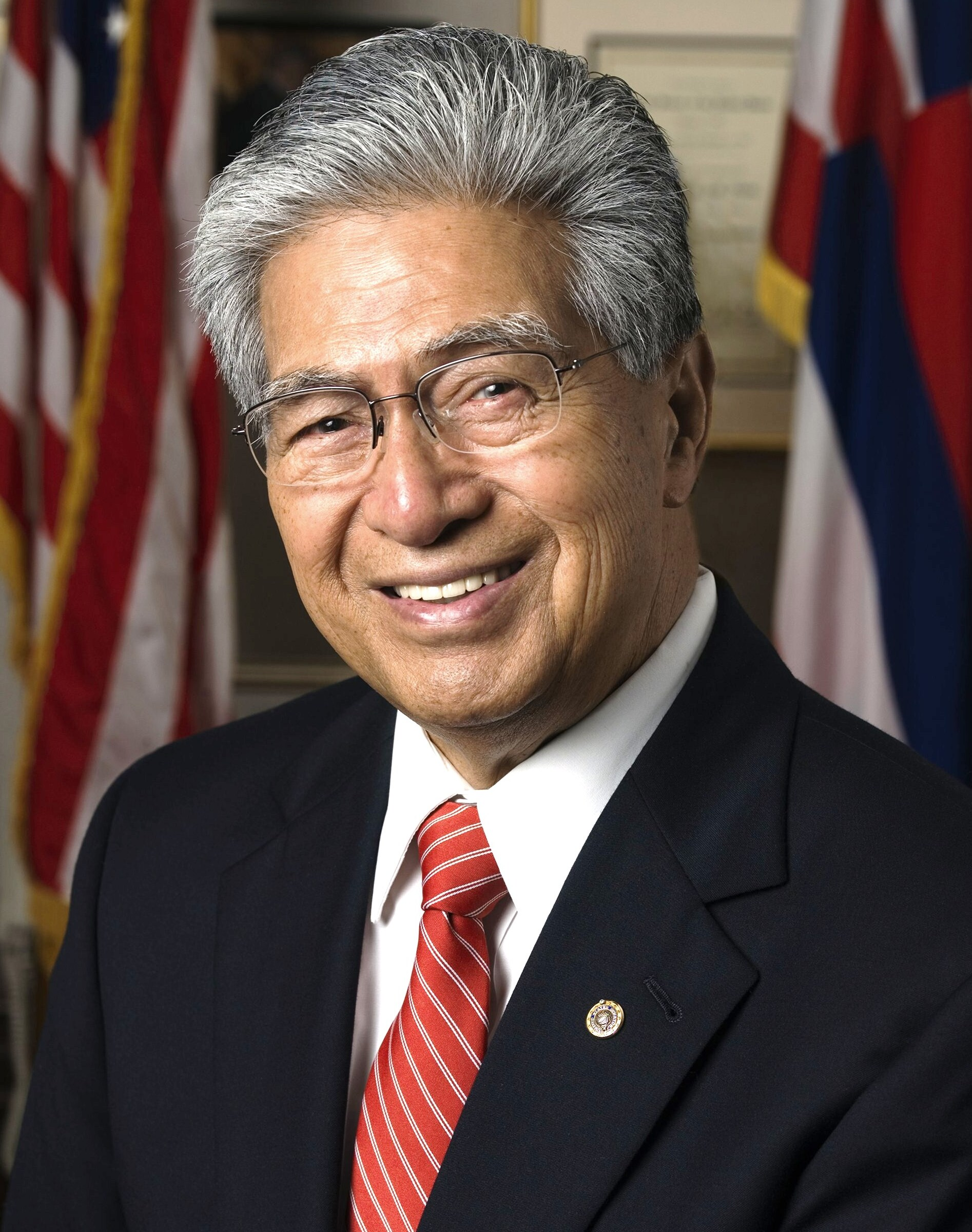

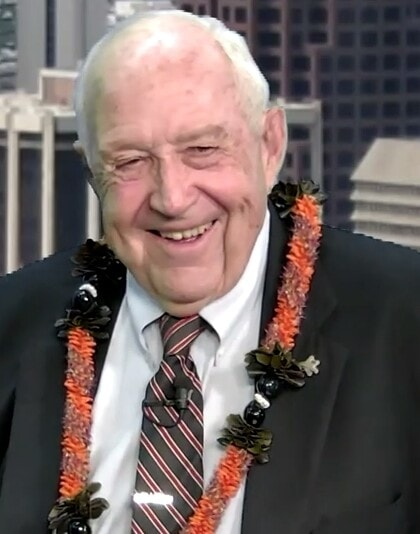
Nominee	Daniel Akaka	John Carroll
Party	Democratic	Republican
Popular vote	251,215	84,701
Percentage	72.68%	24.51%
- County results Akaka: 70–80%
U.S. senator before election
Daniel Akaka
Democratic
Elected U.S. Senator
Daniel Akaka
Democratic

The 2000 United States Senate election in Hawaii was held on November 7, 2000. Democratic incumbent Daniel Akaka was re-elected to a third term in office over John Carroll.

== General election ==
=== Candidates ===
- Daniel Akaka, incumbent U.S. senator since 1990 (Democratic)
- John Carroll, former state senator from Honolulu (Republican)
- Lauri A. Clegg (Natural Law)
- Lloyd Jeffrey Mallan (Libertarian)
- David Porter (Constitution)

=== Polling ===
Poll source	Date(s)	Sample size	Margin of error	Daniel Akaka (D)	John Carroll (R)	Other / undecided (Note: Calculated by taking the difference of 100% and all other candidates combined.)
Harris Insights & Analytics	November 3, 2000	585	—	62%	33%	5%

=== Results ===
General election results
Party	Candidate	Votes	%	±%
Democratic	Daniel Akaka (Incumbent)	251,215	72.68%	+0.90%
Republican	John Carroll	84,701	24.51%	+0.35%
Natural Law	Lauri A. Clegg	4,220	1.21%	N/A
Libertarian	Lloyd Jeffrey Mallan	3,127	0.90%	−3.13%
Constitution	David Porter	2,360	0.68%	N/A
Total votes		345,623	100%	
Democratic hold		Swing		

==== By county ====
County	Daniel Akaka Democratic		John Carroll Republican		All Others		Margin		Total votes cast
County	#	%	#	%	#	%	#	%	Total votes cast
Hawaii	34,092	70.4%	12,468	25.8%	1,849	3.9%	21,624	44.6%	48,409
Honolulu	173,345	72.4%	59,943	25.0%	6,051	2.6%	113,402	47.4%	239,339
Kauaʻi	16,039	79.1%	3,462	17.1%	772	3.8%	12,577	62.0%	20,273
Maui	27,695	73.8%	8,808	23.5%	1,028	2.7%	18,887	50.3%	37,531
Totals	251,215	72.7%	84,701	24.5%	9,707	2.8%	166,514	48.2%	345,623

== See also ==
- 2000 United States Senate elections
