= Maui Time Weekly =

Alternative newspaper in Wailuku, Hawaii

Maui Time

- Type: Alternative weekly
- Format: Tabloid
- Owner: Tommy Russo
- Publisher: Tommy Russo
- Editor: Anthony Pignataro
- Founded: 1997
- Headquarters: 16 S. Market St.#2K; Wailuku, Hawaii, HI 96793; United States
- Circulation: 18,000
- Website: mauitimes.news

Maui Time Weekly (also known as Maui Time Magazine, Maui Time, and the Maui Times) is a free alternative newspaper published weekly in the county of Maui, state of Hawaii. The newspaper is owned mostly by its publisher, Tommy Russo.

Maui Time Weekly was launched in 1997. It serves all of Maui, and is distributed every Thursday. The paper has remained independently owned and operated throughout its existence.

== History ==
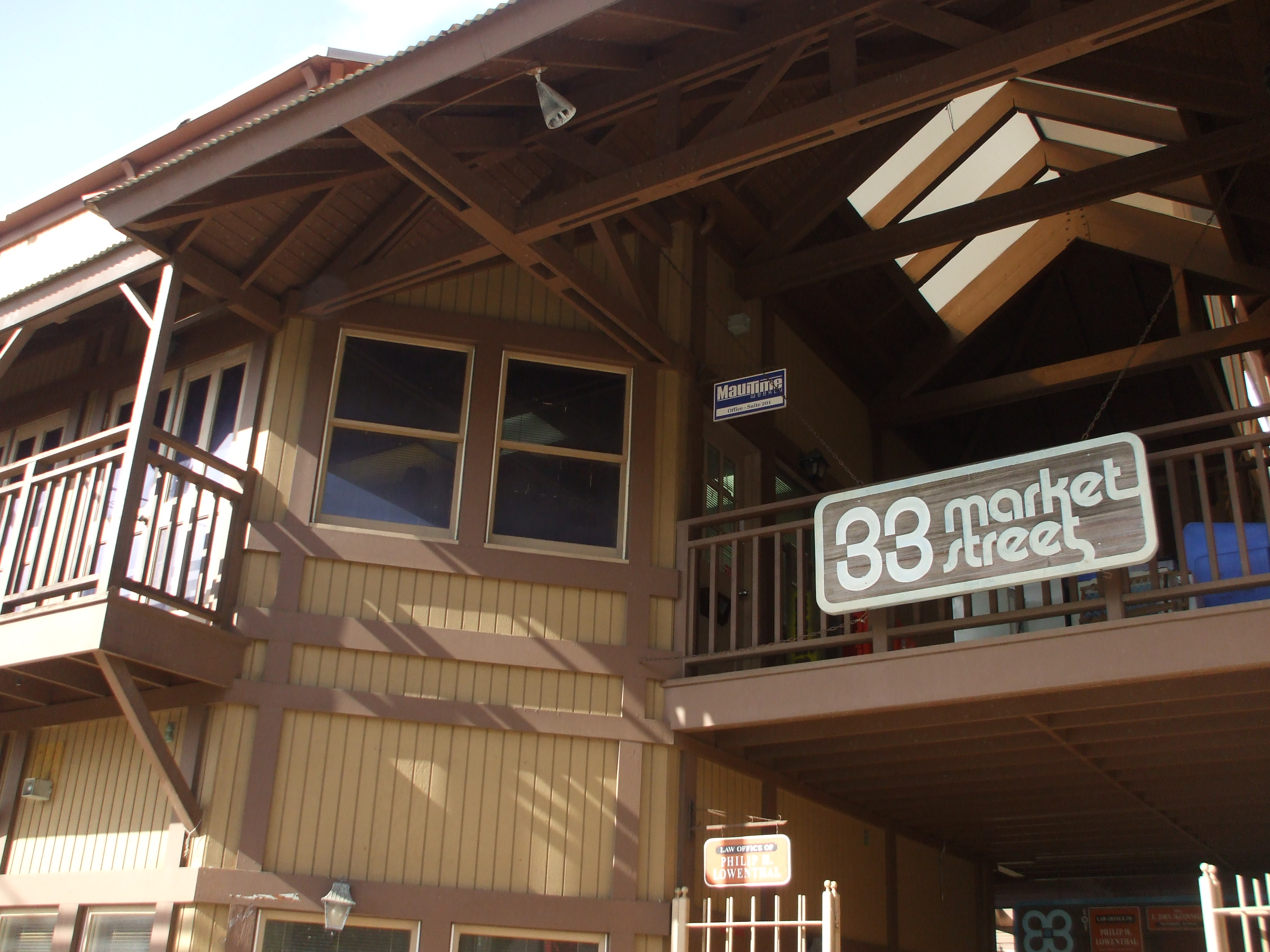
Offices of Maui Time Weekly at 33 North Market Street.

In 1997, Tommy Russo and Mark D'Antonio founded the Maui Time a free bi-weekly newsprint magazine. The two founders were from Chico, California and performed together in the band Sunset Red.

Publisher Russo grew Maui Time into a weekly publication with Maui news, community features, arts and entertainment as its focus. In 2004, the publication was admitted into the Association of Alternative Newsweeklies in 2004.

== Regular features ==
- Regular columns with opinionated views delve into local government and politics.
- Coverage of the local music scene and inclusion of Chuck Shepherd's syndicated column, News of the Weird, are part of Maui Time's content.
- LC Watch monitors the Maui County Department of Liquor Control.
- Rob Report, by former Maui Mayoral candidate Rob Parsons, concentrates on environmental matters.
- Coconut Wireless provides a satirical, sardonic roundup of the week's events.
