= Kinaʻu Boyd Kamaliʻi =

American politician (1930–2005)

- Kamaliʻi in 1983

Trustee of the Office of Hawaiian Affairs
- In office 1992–1996
- Constituency: At-large

Chair of the Native Hawaiians Study Commission
- In office 1981–1983
- Appointed by: Ronald Reagan

Member of the Hawaii House of Representatives
- In office 1984–1986
- Constituency: Ala Moana–Waikīkī
- In office 1974–1982

Personal details
- Born: October 24, 1930 Honolulu, Territory of Hawaii
- Died: October 28, 2005 (aged 75) Honolulu, Hawaii
- Party: Republican

Kinaʻu Boyd Kamaliʻi (October 24, 1930 – October 28, 2005) was an American politician and Native Hawaiian advocate. A Republican, she represented the Ala Moana–Waikīkī district in the Hawaii House of Representatives from 1974 to 1982 and from 1984 to 1986, and led the chamber's Republican minority. In 1981 President Ronald Reagan appointed her chair of the Native Hawaiians Study Commission.When the commission's majority concluded in 1983 that the United States bore no legal or moral responsibility for the overthrow of the Hawaiian Kingdom, she and two other commissioners issued a formal dissent.

== Early life ==
Kamali'i was born in Honolulu on October 24, 1930. She had a sister, Yvonne.

== Career ==
Kamali'i became involved in politics as a member of the Republican National Committee, representing Hawaiian Republicans on the committee from 1971 to 1975. In 1974, Kamali'i won election to the Hawaii House of Representatives in 1974. She initially served in the House until 1982 and had another stint from 1984 to 1986. During her time in the House she was minority leader.

In 1980, Kamali'i was the state chairman for the Ronald Reagan 1980 presidential campaign. The following year, she was appointed to the Native Hawaiians Study Commission as chairman. She served on the committee until 1983 alongside Winona Beamer and Carol E. Dinkins. As chairman of the committee, she ensured that meetings continued until all Hawaiians who wished to speak had spoken, with meetings sometimes running until the early hours of the morning. She, along with all other Hawaiian-based members of the commission, disagreed with the commission's primary finding that the federal government had no wrongdoing in the overthrow of the Hawaiian Kingdom and authored a minority opinion to that effect. She later became involved in the drafting of the initial version of the Akaka Bill, although she did not support later versions.

She was named "Outstanding Hawaiian of the Year" in 1985 by the Association of Hawaiian Civic Clubs. Kamaliʻi later served as administrator of the State Health Planning and Development Agency under Governor John Waiheʻe. In 1992, Kamali'i was made a trustee of the Office of Hawaiian Affairs, a position she held until 1996.

== Personal life ==
Kamali'i had two daughters and one son. She died on October 28, 2005.
