= Andria Tupola =

American politician

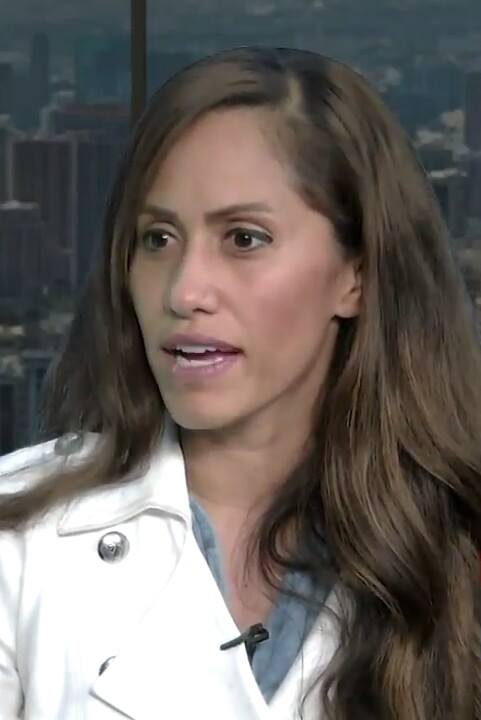
- Tupola in 2017

Member of the Honolulu City Council from the 1st district
- Incumbent
- Assumed office January 2, 2021
- Preceded by: Kymberly Pine

Minority Leader of the Hawaii House of Representatives
- In office February 1, 2017 – November 6, 2018
- Preceded by: Beth Fukumoto
- Succeeded by: Gene Ward

Member of the Hawaii House of Representatives from the 43rd district
- In office November 4, 2014 – November 6, 2018
- Preceded by: Karen Awana
- Succeeded by: Stacelynn Kehaulani Eli

Personal details
- Born: December 6, 1980 (age 45) Oahu, Hawaii, U.S.
- Party: Republican
- Relatives: Bode Uale (father)
- Education: Brigham Young University (BA); University of Hawaiʻi at Mānoa (MA)

Andria Pilialoha Lagimanino Tupola (born December 6, 1980) is an American politician and member of the Honolulu City Council, representing the 1st district since January 2021. She was a Republican member of the Hawaii House of Representatives from 2014 to 2018, representing District 43 (Māʻili, Nānākuli, Ko Olina, Honokai Hale, Kalaeloa, Ewa). In 2015, Tupola served as the minority floor leader for one year. She served as the state house minority leader, making her the first Samoan woman to serve in that position. In 2018, Tupola was the Republican nominee for Governor of Hawaii. She garnered 33% of the vote and lost to incumbent Democrat David Ige.

== Early life ==
Tupola was born at Kahuku hospital to Bode Uale and Beth Parker on the island of Oʻahu. Her father was the first Samoan judge in the United States of America and a third generation immigrant from Samoa. Her mother is the daughter of the Grandmaster of Kenpo Karate, Ed Parker, and was named mother of the year in 2004.

== Education ==
Tupola is a 1998 graduate of Kamehameha Schools in Kapālama, Honolulu. In 2005, she earned her bachelor's degree in music education from Brigham Young University. She served a year-and-a-half mission for the Church of Jesus Christ of Latter-day Saints in Venezuela. She earned her Master of Arts in music education in from the University of Hawaiʻi at Mānoa in 2011, and completed her PhD in music education in December 2021.

== Elections ==
In 2014, Tupola was unopposed for the Republican primary in District 43, winning with 771 votes. In the general election, she faced incumbent Democrat Karen Awana and won with 56% of the vote, unseating the only incumbent in the 2014 general election.

In 2016, Tupola was unopposed for the Republican primary in District 43, winning with 747 votes. In the general election, she faced Stacelynn Kehaulani Eli, a former employee of Karen Awana. Tupola won by 65% with 3,859 votes.

In 2018, she ran as a candidate in the election for Governor of Hawaii. On August 11, 2018, she won the Republican primary receiving 53.0% of the vote, 17,282 votes. Other candidates John Carroll and Ray L'Heureux received 33.7% and 8.8% respectively. She garnered 33% of the vote in the 2018 general election with 131,719 votes. She was the youngest candidate and only native woman running for governor as a Republican in the 2018 cycle.

In 2020, Tupola competed in the non-partisan election for the District 1 Honolulu City Council Seat against four other candidates including Kathy Davenport, Naomi Hanohano, Galen Kerfoot, and Anthony Makana Paris. Tupola received 53.6% of the votes in the August 8 election, avoiding a runoff election and guaranteeing her a four-year term on the Honolulu City Council.

Hawaii House of Representatives
Preceded by Beth Fukumoto	Minority Leader of the Hawaii House of Representatives; 2017–2018	Succeeded by Gene Ward
Party political offices
Preceded by Duke Aiona	Republican nominee for Governor of Hawaii; 2018	Succeeded by Duke Aiona
