= State of Hawaii Organization of Police Officers =

Police union in Hawaii

- Abbreviation: SHOPO
- Formation: 1971; 55 years ago
- Legal status: Police union, political action committee
- Headquarters: Honolulu
- Region served: Hawaii
- President: Malcolm Lutu
- Treasurer: James “Kimo” Smith
- Website: shopohawaii.org

The State of Hawaii Organization of Police Officers (SHOPO) is a police union and political action committee located in Honolulu which represents police across the state of Hawaii. Consisting of a separate chapter for each of the four counties in the state along with a statewide board of directors, SHOPO has engaged in lobbying and legal efforts to keep police misconduct files private, and roughly 10 percent of its spending is focused on advertising to promote police officers and the union itself.

== Establishment and structure ==
SHOPO was founded in 1971 after a law passed by the Hawaii State Legislature in 1970 gave police officers in the state the right to be in a union.

There is a separate chapter of SHOPO for each of the four counties represented, including Honolulu, Kauaʻi, Maui, and Hawaii. Each chapter has a chairperson who also sits on the board of directors for SHOPO as a whole. Other members of the board include three at-large directors as well as a secretary, a treasurer, and a vice president and president. As of July 2020, the treasurer was James “Kimo” Smith; as of July 2021, the president was Malcolm Lutu, a sergeant in the Honolulu Police Department.

== Activity ==
SHOPO's opposition to police reform has been a major factor in preventing its implementation in Hawaii.

=== Efforts to keep police misconduct files private ===
In 1995, SHOPO successfully lobbied the Hawaii State Legislature to make county police departments exempt from the Uniform Information Practices Act, which requires that the disciplinary files for any other public employees who are suspended or fired be made public. A bill intended to remove the exemption subsequently failed twice to pass through a committee that was chaired by a Hawaii state senator who had been endorsed by SHOPO.

In June 2020, House Bill 285, which removed the exemption for county police departments, resurfaced in the Hawaii State Legislature as a result of calls for police accountability by the Black Lives Matter movement in June 2020. The bill had previously been slowed by a joint committee since April 2019. SHOPO opposed the bill, buying a full-page advertisement in the Sunday issue of the Honolulu Star-Advertiser to advocate against it, and additionally sharing a three-page letter written by SHOPO treasurer James “Kimo” Smith arguing against the legislation. Roughly a hundred SHOPO members gathered in the rotunda of the Hawaii State Capitol to demonstrate their opposition to the bill, and dozens of supporters of SHOPO protested outside the building during the final vote on the bill in the Hawaii House of Representatives, where it was passed. It was signed into law by Governor David Ige on September 15, 2020.

After the passage of House Bill 285, which implemented a law called Act 47 to remove the exemption, Honolulu Civil Beat filed several public records requests for information about arbitration decisions related to police misconduct. In November 2020, SHOPO responded with an attempt to overturn Act 47, arguing that it unconstitutionally violated the privacy rights of officers as well as SHOPO's own collective bargaining agreement, which includes secrecy provisions intended to keep officer misconduct from becoming public knowledge. They filed lawsuits against the counties of Honolulu, Kauai, Maui, and Hawaii. As of January 2021, no filings had occurred in the latter three suits, while a judge in Honolulu County had denied an injunction that would have allowed the Honolulu Police Department to omit officer names from their reports.

=== Media campaigns ===
Based on federal tax records, roughly 10 percent of SHOPO's spending is on advertising. Between 2014 and 2018, SHOPO spent more than $1,000,000 on promotion of police officers and the union.

In March 2021, SHOPO began a media campaign involving television commercials intended to promote police officers in Hawaii and rebut criticisms of the police.

=== Endorsements ===
In 2019, SHOPO endorsed Steve Alm's campaign to be Prosecuting Attorney of Honolulu; Alm was elected to the position and sworn in during January 2021.
