= Kymberly Pine =

American politician

Kymberly Marcos Pine
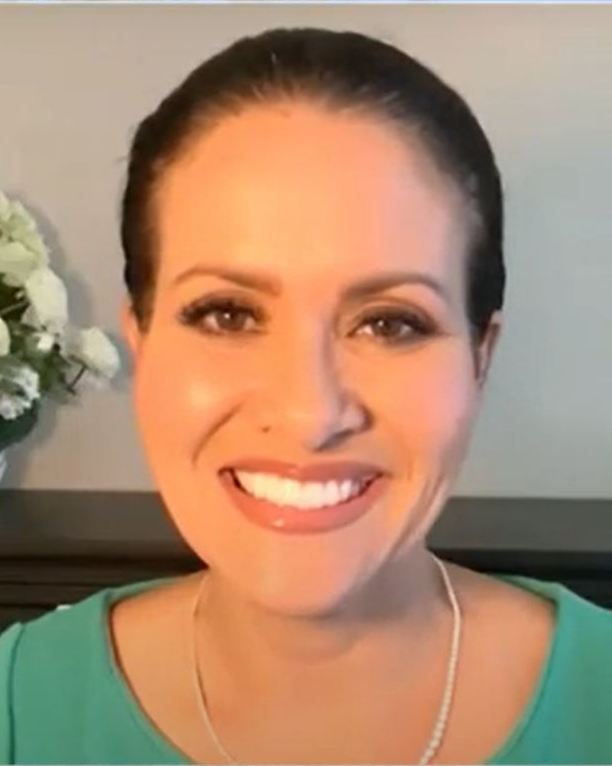

Member of the Honolulu City Council from the 1st district
- In office January 2013 – January 2, 2021
- Preceded by: Tom Berg
- Succeeded by: Andria Tupola

Member of the Hawaii House of Representatives from the 43rd district
- In office 2004–2012
- Preceded by: Romy Mindo
- Succeeded by: Matt LoPresti

Personal details
- Born: September 8, 1970 (age 56)
- Party: Democratic (2017–present)
- Other political affiliations: Republican (until 2017)
- Spouse: Brian Ryglowski (m. 2007)
- Children: 1
- Education: University of California at Berkeley (BA)
- Website: councilmemberpine.com

Kymberly Marcos Pine (born September 8, 1970) is an American politician and Democrat who served two terms on the Honolulu City Council representing District 1 from 2013 to 2021. She was the Chair of the Council Committee on Business, Economic Development and Tourism. Prior to being elected to the City Council, she served as a Representative to the State House of Representatives for four terms. On October 28, 2019, Pine announced her candidacy for Mayor of Honolulu.

== Early life and education ==
Pine grew up on the North Shore of Oahu. Her father is a professor of philosophy at the University of Hawaiʻi and Honolulu Community College. Her mother is a retired nurse of Spanish, Filipino, and Chinese descent, born and raised on Oʻahu. Her maternal grandparents were a Filipino immigrant and a Maui-born Filipino plantation worker. Her paternal grandparents are of Irish, English and Scottish descent. She is directly related to Ferdinand Marcos. Her grandfather served in the United States Coast Guard as a chef during the Attack on Pearl Harbor. Pine has worked with American Veterans – Hawaiʻi, a non-profit transitional home for former homeless veterans, located in the Ewa District, Hawaii.

Pine played shortstop on the Manoa All Star Little League Team, disguising herself as a boy in order to qualify. She attended Waialua and Moanalua High Schools and was a member of the Hawaiʻi Olympic Development Soccer Team. Selected as Oʻahu Interscholastic Association West All-Star MVP player, she also ran cross-country and track, placing second in the OIA in various competitions.

Pine graduated from the University of California, Berkeley in 2000 with a degree in English. She was a member of the Alpha Chi Omega sorority.

== Career ==
Pine served as the Director of the Hawaii House of Representatives Minority Research Office (2002–2004). She was the chief of staff for Representative David Pendleton from 1997 to 2001.

Pine was elected to the State House of Representatives in 2004 to represent district 43, defeating an incumbent with about 60% of the vote. District 43 then covered the Ewa Beach, Iroquois Point, and Puʻuloa areas.

She served in the state house from 2004 to 2012 and was the first Republican to be elected to this seat since Hawaiʻi's statehood. In 2007, Pine was named one of the nation's 100 most influential half-Filipino women by the Filipina Women's Network. From 2010 to 2012 she served as the House Minority floor leader.

One of Pine's 2012 priorities for the legislative session was to keep the community informed regarding the closure of the Hawaii Medical Center West facility in Ewa Beach in December 2011.

In 2012, she created the Hire Leeward Job and Career Fair. Originally it was a five-year initiative to help the 1,000 people that lost their jobs from the HMC West and East locations. They expected 600–800 attendees, and 3,000 showed. The events brought thousands of jobs to West Oʻahu residents each year. In August 2019, they completed the 7th Annual Hire Leeward Job and Career Fair.

=== Honolulu City Council ===
In 2012, Pine was elected to the Honolulu City Council, representing District 1, which includes the areas of ʻEwa, ʻEwa Beach, Kapolei, Honokai Hale, Ko Olina, Nanakuli, Maʻili, Waiʻanae, Makaha, Keaau and Makua. She beat incumbent Tom Berg by more than 25 percentage points. In 2016, she won her re-election campaign with a landslide to serve her second, 4-year term.

During her time at the Honolulu City Council, she fought for the improvement of parks throughout District 1 and allocated millions of dollars in Capital Improvement Project funds to improve infrastructure, roads, parks and public facilities throughout the Leeward Coast.

In 2017, Councilmember Pine spearheaded efforts in getting Kapolei/ʻEwa designated as a "Blue Zone Project" area. The project creates community awareness through events and opportunities for Leeward residents to learn about healthy lifestyle choices in order to reduce the high rate of health risks impacting the district.

As Chair of the Zoning and Housing Committee on the City Council, she worked with developers, nonprofits and lawmakers to change long-standing practices that made if difficult to build more affordable housing. This resulted in several affordable housing projects on Oʻahu that provide units at all income levels on Oʻahu, which currently experiences a housing crisis. She also worked to pass legislation that protects residential zoned areas to reduce the impact of illegal construction and uses.

Pine resigned from the Republican Party on November 9, 2016, stating that many of the national party's new priorities had diverted from her long-held philosophical beliefs about inclusivity and progress.

=== Leeward Oʻahu ===
The Leeward Oʻahu district of Ewa Beach, Kapolei, Honokai Hale, Ko Olina, Nanakuli, Maʻili, Waiʻanea, Makaha, Keaau and Makua, previously experienced millions of dollars in neglected infrastructure improvements. Since Pine became a state House member in 2004, the Leeward Coast obtained over $1 billion in infrastructure improvements. Her efforts have resulted in the crackdown of illegal dumping, improvements to parks, and enhanced safety in the Leeward district.

In 2012, she created the Hire Leeward Job and Career Fair. Originally a five-year initiative to help the 1,000 people impacted by the closure of the Hawaiʻi Medical Center East in Liliha and the Hawaiʻi Medical Center West in Ewa, the job fair drew 3,000 attendees. As of 2020, the annual Hire Leeward Job and Career Fair continues to place thousands of West Oʻahu residents in Leeward jobs.

=== Safety initiatives ===
To improve the safety of both tourists and residents on public beaches, Pine introduced Bill 39 in 2019, which became Ordinance 19-26, that extends lifeguard hours for the island of Oahu from sunup to sundown, in response to drownings that occurred in the hours before and after lifeguards were on duty. She originally introduced Res. 16-43 to extend lifeguard hours in March 2016, and then introduced a bill to make this law in 2019. The resolution authorized a four-day work week with ten-hour shifts for lifeguards based upon a successful pilot program for lifeguards at Haunama Bay.

=== Environmental issues ===
Pine promoted several pieces of legislation to protect the environment, including a 2017 bill banning the use of Styrofoam food containers. In 2019, Pine joined the Honolulu City Council to pass Bill 40, which became Ordinance 19-30, thought at the time to be the most comprehensive phase-out of plastics in the nation.

Citing case studies that flexible schedules improved workplace performance, reduced sick time and worker's compensation claims and reduced energy use to mitigate carbon emissions, on January 15, 2020, Pine introduced Resolution 20-8. This Resolution asked the city to adopt a four-day, ten-hour work week for city workers.

As Chair of the Business, Economic Development and Tourism Committee, Pine created several pieces of legislation called the "Keep Hawaiʻi Hawaiʻi" Package. In 2019, Pine introduced Bill 34 to require the visitor industry to provide annual reports on the progress of sustainability efforts to the city. She introduced Bill 51, "Keep Hawaiʻi Hawaiʻi – A Promise to Our Keiki," which became Ordinance 20-002 in 2020 and asks tourists and locals to sign a pledge to respect the environment, wildlife and culture of Oʻahu. Bill 3 (2020) introduced a Keep Hawaiʻi Hawaiʻi Pass to allow tourists and locals to purchase a pass to several city attractions and Bill 68 (2019) would create a fund for the proceeds to supplement impacts to City emergency services, infrastructure, parks and beaches from tourism. She also introduced resolutions to ask the state legislature to require that educational videos be shown to airline and cruise passengers regarding environmental and cultural issues and encouraged the state legislature to consider visitor impact fees.

=== Inclusionary housing and homelessness ===
In 2019, Pine supported legislation to limit short-term vacation rentals that negatively impacted many residential neighborhoods and constrained the rental housing market by taking units offline. The hospitality industry also blamed vacation rentals for suppressed growth in tourism-related dollars. The bill became Ordinance 18 (2019).

Pine, who chaired the Committee on Zoning and Housing, created legislation (Bill 7 2019) that changed zoning requirements to allow owners of small lots to develop affordable rental housing, which became Ordinance 19-8 (2019).

In response to critical shortages in housing, in 2019, Pine introduced legislation to amend land use regulations for low-rise apartment dwellings and enable low-cost housing construction, and Bill 29 to incentivize development of affordable housing. Bill 58 (2017)/Ordinance 18-10, redrafted in part by Pine, established incentives for developing affordable housing that extends affordability from 10 years to 30 years, depending on the number of units.

She supported legislation to end "monster homes" (Ordinance 18-6) on Oʻahu which were blamed by many groups for violating safety codes, functioning as illegal rentals and filling residential streets with illegal parking. New regulations require parking spaces based on the size of the home, minimum yard setbacks and limits to the number of wet bars and bathrooms.

In June 2019, Pine appropriated and the City Council approved $23 million for Pine's plan to address homelessness in each of the nine council districts. Funds can also be used for facilities including rest stops, shelters, outreach centers and affordable housing in Waianae; provides $2 million for homeless service zones with a hygiene facility; and creates a center where health and human services can be administered.

=== Sweeping change ===
Pine entered the 2020 mayoral race calling for sweeping changes to end corruption in government in the wake of the Katherine (former Honolulu City deputy prosecutor) and Louis Kealoha (former Honolulu police chief) scandal, the Federal investigation of HART, and the Save Sherwood Forest protests in Waimanalo.

Pine has said publicly that she considers herself "as an outsider to Honolulu politicians." She has publicly challenged the policies of Mayor Kirk Caldwell and the project delays and mismanagement of the city's Honolulu Rail Transit (HART). Originally estimated to cost taxpayers $5.3 billion, it is now estimated to total $9–13 billion, and has become the subject of an FTA investigation. In 2017, Pine opposed lifting the rail tax cap. Pine opposed Bill 66, a Caldwell-supported bill to raise fares on public transportation, including TheBus and TheHandiVan.

Pine opposed the construction of a 17-acre, $32 million sports complex in Waimanalo at Sherwood Forest. Hundreds of Native Hawaiians opposed the complex and 28 were arrested for blocking access to Waimanalo Bay Beach Park. The protesters cited concerns about archaeological and cultural significance, overdevelopment and traffic.

Pine publicly opposed construction of thirteen 260-foot wind turbines in the Palehua Agricultural lands by EE Ewa LLC's (Eurus Energy), in a power purchase by Hawaiian Electric. She joined the local neighborhood boards, who opposed the building on sacred Hawaiian lands. In addition, the turbines could impact homeowners' views.

Council Member Pine also challenged the Police Commission in September 2019, voting with the city council against a $100 million payout for criminal attorneys representing convicted former police chief Louis Kealoha. She has publicly stated that she feels that it's "ridiculous" and that the city should not be financially responsible for the willful criminal acts of city employees, opposing the use of taxpayer funds for out-of-state lawyers to defend employees of the rail project, the police department or the prosecutor's office who may have participated in illegal acts while on city time. She also spoke against the Police Commission's decision to grant a $250,000 severance payout to Louis Kealoha.

=== Parks ===
Pine brought millions of dollars to the Leeward Coast to improve infrastructure, enhance security and clean up public parks for her constituents. She has sought to fund improvements and enhancements for public parks and recreation.

Pine introduced several measures in support of public parks and public safety throughout Oʻahu. Pine's Resolution 19-333 would enable the city to increase the number of park rangers and expand the program island-wide in order to promote public safety and environmental protection. Pine supports alternative funding through private sponsorship for the historic Honolulu Zoo, which, due to lack of funding, lost its accreditation in 2016.

In addition, in 2015, she introduced Bill 78, CD1, FD1 to acknowledge sponsorship of city assets with name recognition to enhance public-private partnership possibilities. (Ordinance 15-42, 2015).

In 2018, Pine accused Mayor Caldwell of playing favorites with park monies, spending the bulk of funds allocated for park improvements at popular tourist site, Ala Moana Park, while Leeward Coast parks suffered from potholed parking lots, homeless encampments, trash and safety improvements that were not addressed. Citing inequitable distribution of city resources, Pine introduced Resolution 19-091, to require and audit of the Department of Parks and Recreation to determine whether all Oahu Parks were receiving fair treatment.

After years of citing criminal activity and homeless encampments at Oneʻula Beach Park in Ewa Beach, nightly closure hours were finally instituted in January 2020, and a master plan for improvements was implemented.

=== Women ===
In 2016, Pine called for a performance audit to examine how the Prosecutor's office and the Honolulu Police Department handle domestic violence, enforce temporary restraining orders and process cases through the courts. Resolution 16-001 produced a report showing that cases of domestic violence increased 600% from 2013 to 2016 and that only 14% of those cases ever reached court.

In 2020, Pine authored Bill 10, to ensure gender-equity and fair allocation of permits for the use of park facilities for sports after female surfers complained that they had not been able to obtain a permit for North Shore, Oahu female surf contests during pristine surf seasons for ten years.

=== Additional city legislation ===
Pine supported Res. 18-73, a resolution to facilitate the development of a race track or raceway in Honolulu with the use of private investment and funding.

In 2016, Pine and a fellow councilmember introduced Bill 24 to strengthen the enforcement of restrictions on illegal dumping of bulky items. The new law allowed inspectors to fine the individual perpetrators who illegally dump bulky items, not just the nearby residents and managers. In response to complaints of frequently closed and overwhelmed Leeward refuse centers, she introduced Resolution 19-101 to require that the City Department of Environmental Services conduct an evaluation of Leeward sites and provide recommendations on how to improve services. In the report, the department identified staffing shortages and lack of capacity as challenges.

=== Cyber crime ===
Pine was a victim of cybercrime in 2011 and worked to help strengthen the state's cybercrime laws by introducing four groundbreaking bills to curb the growing cyber crime trend in Hawaii. The bills were the result of the cyber crime informational briefing co-chaired by Pine.

On July 10, 2012, all four bills Pine introduced to curb Hawaii's growing cyber crime trend became law. Under these laws, prosecutors and law enforcement increase ability to investigate, obtain evidence, and bring cyber criminals to justice with new or stiffer penalties:

- (HB 1777) Measure allowing out-of-state records to be subpoenaed in criminal cases. Authorizes judges in Hawaii's State court system to require that certain records located or held by entities outside Hawaii be released to the prosecution or defense in a criminal case. Prosecutors will now be able to obtain evidence that is often in the hands of mainland corporations, such as cell phone records. The Honolulu Prosecutor's Office advocated for the bill, testifying that it was the most important action Hawaii could take to aid in the prosecution of cybercriminals.
- (HB 1788) a measure to strengthen Hawaii's existing computer fraud and unauthorized computer access laws. A cybercrime omnibus bill that strengthens existing computer crime laws by making computer fraud laws mirror Hawaii's identify theft laws; the result is that accessing a computer with the intent to commit theft becomes a more serious offense. The law also imposes harsher penalties by reclassifying the severity of computer fraud and unauthorized computer access offenses. Notably, the bill creates the new offense of Computer Fraud in the Third Degree, a class C felony; this particular crime would involve knowingly accessing a computer, computer system, or computer network with intent to commit theft in the third or fourth degree.
- (HB 2295) a measure to prohibit adults from soliciting minors to electronically transmit nude images of a minor(s). HB 2295 expands the existing offense of Use of a Computer in the Commission of a Separate Crime to include situations where a perpetrator knowingly uses a computer to pursue, conduct surveillance on, contact, harass, annoy, or alarm the victim or intended victim of the crimes of Harassment under HRS 711-1106 or Harassment by Stalking under HRS 711‑1106.5. This law recognizes that using a computer to commit such crimes is an aggravating factor that justifies an additional penalty.
- (SB 2222) addresses "sexting". The bill would create two new offenses in HRS chapter 712 that would: Prohibit an adult from intentionally or knowingly soliciting a minor to electronically transmit a nude image (photo or video) of a minor to any person (misdemeanor); prohibit a minor from knowingly electronically transmitting a nude image of him/herself or any other minor to any person, or intentionally or knowingly soliciting another minor to do so (petty misdemeanor); and prohibit a person of any age from knowingly possessing a nude image transmitted by a minor (but a person charged with this crime would have an affirmative defense that he/she made reasonable efforts to destroy the nude image (petty misdemeanor)).

=== 2020 Honolulu mayoral election ===
On October 28, 2019, Pine announced her candidacy for Mayor of Honolulu. She placed fourth in the August nonpartisan blanket primary and did not advance to the November general election.

== Affiliations ==
Her affiliations include membership in the parish of Our Lady of Perpetual Help Catholic Church, where she serves as a lector and a member of the Filipino Catholic Club. She is a former member of the Ewa Beach Lions Club, former AYSO Soccer coach, and former chairperson of the Ewa Beach Weed and Seed Neighborhood Restoration Project.

== Personal life ==
Pine is a practicing Catholic. She is married to LCDR Brian Ryglowski, USN. Pine gave birth to their daughter in March 2015, and was the first sitting council member to have a baby while in office. She lives in Ewa Beach with her family, including two dogs and two cats.

== See also ==
- List of American politicians who switched parties in office
