= Kenneth Lawson =

Law professor and former lawyer

- Born: April 19, 1963 (age 63); Cincinnati, Ohio, U.S.
- Education: BA, Wittenberg College, 1986; JD, University of Cincinnati College of Law, 1989
- Occupations: Co-director of Hawai'i Innocence Project, faculty specialist at William S. Richardson School of Law
- Children: 5

Kenneth L. Lawson (born April 19, 1963) is the co-director of the Hawai'i Innocence Project, a faculty specialist at the William S. Richardson School of Law, and a former attorney.

Born in Cincinnati, Lawson spent the first three years of his life in an orphanage before being adopted. He played football in high school, and went on to attend Wittenberg College, graduating in 1986. While he was at Wittenberg, he married Marva Lawson after the birth of the couple's first child.

Lawson obtained a Juris Doctor in 1989 and became licensed to practice law in Ohio the same year. He was the first African American lawyer at Taft Stettinius & Hollister, but left to practice criminal defense law on his own in 1993. While working as a criminal defense lawyer in Cincinnati, Lawson became addicted to opioids and cocaine after being prescribed Percodan and Percocet when he tore his rotator cuff while weightlifting in the year 2000. He checked into a detox facility in 2007, and said in 2019 that he had not used drugs or alcohol since then. Lawson had his license to practice law suspended by the Supreme Court of Ohio in July 2008 for professional misconduct including failure to properly represent clients and theft of funds, was incarcerated in 2009 for conspiracy to obtain prescription drugs, and was disbarred permanently by the Supreme Court of Ohio in 2011 as a result of a second complaint about his actions while addicted.

Released from prison in 2010 and sent to a halfway house in Kalihi, Lawson began working as a research assistant for Randall Roth at the William S. Richardson School of Law. He eventually also became an employee of the Hawai'i Innocence Project, a program of the school. After co-teaching Roth's professional responsibility course, Lawson was invited to teach on his own as an adjunct professor. By 2012, he had become the co-director of the Hawaii Innocence Project, additionally teaching courses on subjects including criminal procedure, criminal law, and professional responsibility; a 2021 article in The Guardian described him as "a civil rights academic." Lawson frequently provides legal analysis to the local media in Hawaii. On May 1, 2017, Lawson was honored with the University of Hawaii Board of Regents’ Medal for Excellence. The award is a tribute to faculty members who exhibit an extraordinary level of subject-level mastery and scholarship, teaching effectiveness, creativity, and personal values that benefit students.

== Early life and education ==
Lawson was born on April 19, 1963, in Cincinnati and raised in an orphanage until he was three years old, when he was adopted by Etta and Lawyer Lawson. Lawson is biracial, with a Black biological father and an Italian biological mother. He was not aware of his mixed ancestry until he searched for his biological mother years later. He grew up in the neighborhoods of Avondale, Lincoln Heights, and Woodlawn.

Lawson attended Princeton High School, where he played on the football team as middle linebacker, graduating in 1981. He met his future wife Marva at the school. After graduating, Lawson went to Wittenberg College. The Cincinnati Enquirer reported in 1998 that Lawson attended Wittenberg for a year before running out of money and returning to Cincinnati; Lawson stated in 2020 that he actually attended for two years before being expelled for fighting while drunk. He returned to Cincinnati and was considering joining the Air Force when he learned that he had qualified for financial aid or was allowed to return on probation. He then resumed college at Wittenberg, where he was joined by Marva after the birth of their first child. The couple married and worked to support themselves through college. He obtained a Bachelor of Arts from Wittenberg College in 1986 and a Juris Doctor from University of Cincinnati College of Law in 1989.

In 1990, he began looking for his biological family, and discovered through Catholic Social Services that he had been born at Longview State Hospital, a mental institution. After searching through library and probate records, he located his biological mother, named Stella Angelo. Lawson learned that Angelo's uncle had broken her clavicle because of her relationship with a Black man, that Angelo was four months pregnant with him when she was sent to Longview State Hospital, and that she was released after he was born. He additionally learned that Angelo had been a prostitute for parts of her life. During Lawson's search for his birth parents, a cousin had told him that his biological father was Ezzard Charles, but no documentation was found to confirm paternity and Stella Angelo did not confirm it before her death in 1993.

== Law practice ==
After becoming licensed to practice law in Ohio in 1989, Lawson began working as a lawyer in Cincinnati. He was the first African American lawyer at Taft Stettinius & Hollister, but left to start his own practice because the job "paid well but left [him] feeling empty". He founded a criminal defense law practice called Lawson and Associates in 1993. As of 2000, Lawson hosted a Saturday morning radio program called "Lawson's Law" on WCIN-AM. Joe Deters criticized him in a Cincinnati Enquirer profile for not defending the office of the Hamilton County prosecutor when callers on Lawson's Law spoke critically about the office, saying that he liked Lawson on "a personal level" but that Lawson was failing to use his "unique opportunity" to teach the Black community about "the realities of the court system", and concluding that his "reluctance" to do so was the only thing preventing him "from being a great lawyer and a great citizen". Lawson was criticized for unprofessionalism by some other attorneys, and acknowledged being disliked by some police officers. He represented clients in multiple cases related to the police, including the family of Lorenzo Collins, who was shot and killed by Cincinnati police while threatening officers with a brick; marches protesting the killing of Collins were organized in part by Lawson.

Lawson additionally represented high-profile clients including Deion Sanders, Danny Fortson, and Aaron Pryor. However, he has stated that he still did not feel happy or satisfied. He began drinking and partying more often, and was kicked out of the house by his wife, moving in with his brother George Lawson who worked for him at the time. After returning home for a few days in an attempt to convince his wife to let him live there again, Lawson was unable to reach his brother, and found that he had killed himself in their shared condo. This suicide occurred three days before the start of a trial in which Kenneth Lawson would defend a teen from West End who had killed a pregnant woman and her unborn child in a car accident. Lawson subsequently moved back in with his family.

In the year 2000, Lawson says he tore his rotator cuff while weightlifting, and was prescribed the drugs Percodan and Percocet for pain management. He disregarded the instructions of his physician, taking as many pills as he felt was necessary and eventually finding a doctor who would sell him prescriptions. He additionally bought prescription medication off the street. In his last two years of using drugs, Lawson states that they were costing him $1,000 per day and that he needed at least one prescription per day because his tolerance had increased so much. He additionally states that he recognized that he was addicted to opioids and cocaine as well as to alcohol, but was unable to stop on his own, and ended up stealing money from clients and lying to judges and his family as a result.

In 2007, a judge recognized that Lawson was abusing substances, and "blew the whistle" on him. Lawson checked himself into a detox facility on February 1 of that year, and stated in March 2019 that he had not used drugs or alcohol since then. Former clients subsequently filed motions and complaints because of Lawson's behavior while using drugs, at which point he says that he learned that he did not remember representing some of them; multiple cases were overturned as a result.

=== Disbarment ===
In 2008, Lawson's wife moved to Honolulu along with their three children to work at a local hospital. In July 2008, the Supreme Court of Ohio suspended Lawson's license to practice law, citing wrongdoings including failure to properly represent 15 clients and theft of funds as well as failure to cooperate with a disciplinary investigation. The ruling described a "pervasive pattern of professional misconduct", but did not prevent a future return to legal practice, mentioning that Lawson was making efforts to address his chemical dependence. In September of the same year, Lawson was indicted on in federal court in Ohio for felony charges of conspiracy to obtain controlled substances, specifically prescription drugs such as Percodan and OxyContin. The conspiracy included Lawson's physician, who was estimated to have written 700 to 800 prescriptions for Lawson between 2004 and 2007, many of them in other people's names. Lawson claimed that the physician had exploited him, but pled guilty to the charges.

While Lawson was waiting for sentencing in Hawaii, the director of the lawyer assistance program of the Ohio State Bar Association introduced him to Randall Roth, a professor at the William S. Richardson School of Law. Lawson and Roth discussed Lawson's experience with addiction, and Roth asked Lawson to speak to a group of about 100 students in a class on professional responsibility. Lawson did so; Roth additionally gave Lawson a tour of the University of Hawaiʻi at Mānoa, where he met the director of the Hawaii Innocence Project.

Lawson was sentenced in April 2009 to two years in federal prison followed by one year of supervised release and 1,000 hours of community service. He was released from prison in March 2010, and rejoined his wife and children. In September 2011, as a result of a second disciplinary case that had been filed against Lawson, the Supreme Court of Ohio disbarred him permanently without the possibility of a return to legal practice in Ohio.

== Career in Hawaii ==
After Lawson was released from prison and moved to Hawaii, Randall Roth hired Lawson to be his research assistant; he eventually became an employee at the Hawaii Innocence Project, a program of the William S. Richardson School of Law. He also began co-teaching Roth's professional responsibility course, and as a result, he was invited by School of Law Dean Avi Soifer to teach on his own as an adjunct professor.

Lawson states that he quickly had "one of the heaviest teaching loads at the law school", and in 2019, he described himself as "a tenure-track faculty member". By 2012, he had become the co-director of the Hawaii Innocence Project.

Lawson frequently provides legal analysis to the local media in Hawaii. In January 2015, Hawaii State Senators Mike Gabbard and Brickwood Galuteria introduced legislation that would have created "character and fitness" requirements for faculty at the Richardson School of Law, including a prohibition on the employment of people who had previously been suspended or disbarred from practicing law. Lawson told Honolulu Civil Beat that the law, which may have caused him to lose his job, was intended to target him as a result of his public commentary on high-profile cases. In March 2019, Hawaii criminal defense attorney Rustam Barbee (who was then representing Louis Kealoha, a former Honolulu Police Chief on trial for federal conspiracy and public corruption) sent a letter to Avi Soifer requesting that Lawson be prevented from commenting to the media on the Kealoha trial as well as the related trial of his wife Katherine Kealoha and the trials of other Honolulu police officers. The letter, which was six pages long, said that Lawson should be fired if he did not stop discussing the cases with the media. Lawson described the letter as a bullying tactic intended to silence him.

In June 2020, Lawson attended and spoke at a Black Lives Matter protest in Honolulu. A 2021 article in The Guardian described him as "a civil rights academic". He teaches courses at the William S. Richardson School of Law on subjects including criminal procedure, criminal law, and professional responsibility.
