= Colin McDonald =

Colin McDonald may refer to:

- Colin McDonald (Australian cricketer) (1928–2021), Australian cricketer
- Colin McDonald (New Zealand cricketer) (1948–2005), New Zealand cricketer
- Colin McDonald (footballer, born 1930) (1930–2026), English football goalkeeper
- Colin McDonald (footballer, born 1974), Scottish football forward
- Colin McDonald (ice hockey) (born 1984), American ice hockey player
- Colin McDonald (attorney) (born 1988), American attorney and prosecutor
- Colin MacGilp MacDonald (1882–1964), British historian and author

== See also ==
- Colin MacDonald (disambiguation)
