= Colin McDonald (attorney) =

American attorney (born 1988)

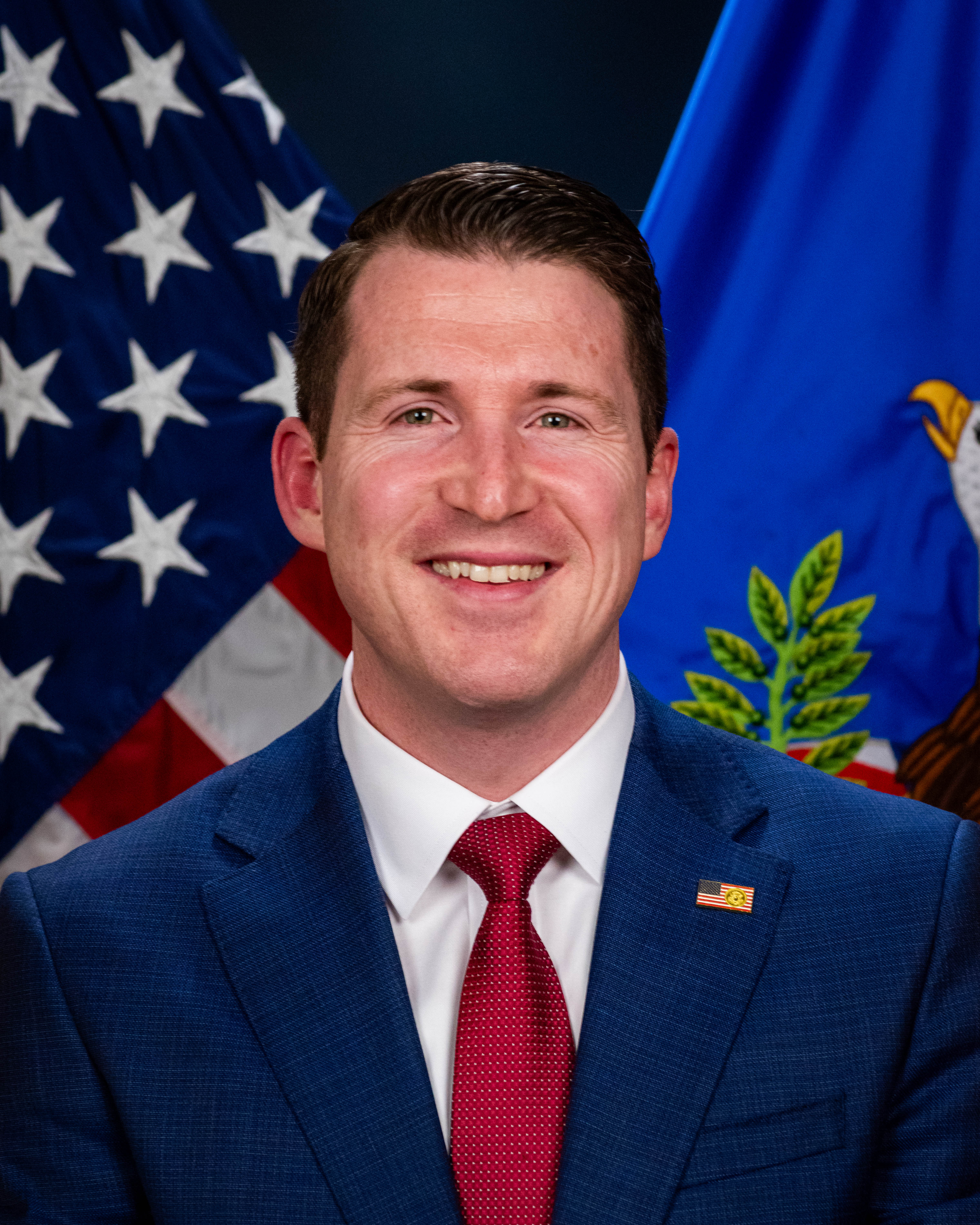
- Official portrait, 2026

United States Assistant Attorney General for the National Fraud Enforcement Division
- Incumbent
- Assumed office April 1, 2026
- President: Donald Trump
- Preceded by: Todd Kim (Note: As the assistant attorney general for the environment and natural resources division.)

Personal details
- Born: Colin Michael McDonald; February 13, 1988 (age 38) San Diego County, California, U.S.
- Spouse: Janessa McDonald
- Children: 5

Colin Michael McDonald (born February 13, 1988) is an American attorney and prosecutor who has served as the United States assistant attorney general for the national fraud enforcement division since 2026.

McDonald began working as an assistant United States attorney in the United States Attorney's Office for the Southern District of California in 2014. He prosecuted several individuals associated with the Honolulu Police Department, including its chief, Louis Kealoha, and his wife, Katherine. In January 2025, McDonald became an associate deputy attorney general working for deputy attorney general Todd Blanche. He served as the co-director of the Weaponization Working Group within the Department of Justice and coordinated with federal law enforcement agencies in seeking to prosecute protesters who opposed Operation Metro Surge.

In January 2026, president Donald Trump named McDonald as his nominee for assistant attorney general for the National Fraud Enforcement Division, a newly established position. McDonald appeared before the Senate Committee on the Judiciary the following month, in which he faced questions over political prosecutions. He was confirmed by the Senate in March.

== Early life and education ==
Colin Michael McDonald was born on February 13, 1988, in San Diego County, California. McDonald has a wife and five children.

== Career ==
=== Assistant U.S. attorney (2014–2024) ===
McDonald began working as an assistant United States attorney in the United States Attorney's Office for the Southern District of California in 2014. He prosecuted former Honolulu Police Department chief Louis Kealoha; his wife, Katherine; and two police officers.

=== Associate deputy attorney general (2025–present) ===
In January 2025, McDonald began working for deputy attorney general Todd Blanche as an associate deputy attorney general. As Minnesota officials and protesters conflicted with the Trump administration over Operation Metro Surge in January 2026, McDonald began coordinating with the Federal Bureau of Investigation and Homeland Security Investigations to quickly prosecute protesters. McDonald additionally worked with Aakash Singh in finding evidence to indict Minnesota governor Tim Walz, Minneapolis mayor Jacob Frey, and Minnesota attorney general Keith Ellison. By the following month, McDonald had been working with deputy homeland security advisor Anthony Salisbury on a working group to prosecute election fraud. McDonald had additionally served as the co-director of the Weaponization Working Group by February.

== U.S. Assistant Attorney General for Fraud Enforcement ==
In January 2026, vice president JD Vance announced that the Department of Justice would establish a division for fraud enforcement that would be operated by the White House Office. That month, CBS News reported that Donald Trump was considering appointing McDonald, believed to be an ally of Todd Blanche. On January 28, 2026, Trump announced that he would nominate McDonald as the assistant attorney general for national fraud enforcement, a newly established position. Despite Vance's statement, the administration later indicated that McDonald would report to Blanche and attorney general Pam Bondi while coordinating with Vance and Federal Trade Commission chair Andrew N. Ferguson; the move came after Trump sought to establish a task force to investigate fraud with Vance as its chair.

McDonald appeared before the Senate Committee on the Judiciary on February 25, 2026. He faced questions over the Trump administration's alleged direct influence on prosecutions, particularly in investigating fraud. McDonald presented himself as non-partisan, an assertion that was rebuked by Democrats on the committee, some of whom noted his work at the Weaponization Working Group. He did not answer a question on whether he would prosecute an individual on Trump's order and declined to give precise answers to the entirety of California senator Adam Schiff's questions. The Senate Committee on the Judiciary voted along party lines on March 19 to advance McDonald's nomination, and he was confirmed by the Senate on March 24.
