= Cincinnati shooting =

Cincinnati shooting may refer to:

- Cincinnati riots of 2001, a series of riots that occurred after the fatal shooting of Timothy Thomas, an African American man, by Cincinnati police
- Shooting of Samuel DuBose, the fatal shooting of an African American man by University of Cincinnati police in 2015
- 2018 Cincinnati shooting, a mass shooting at the Fifth Third Center that killed four people, including the gunman
- Cincinnati FBI field office attack, a failed terrorist attempt in which the gunman was fatally shot by police after a standoff in 2022
