= Lorenzo Collins =

Lorenzo Collins (May 22, 1971 – February 28, 1997) was an African-American man with a history of mental illness who was shot by Cincinnati police while threatening officers with a brick, subsequently dying from his injuries five days later at age twenty-five. During the previous three months of his life Collins had been in and out of the Hamilton County mental health system. Many experts involved in the case believed that Collins, who was a violent psychotic, should never have been released from treatment to begin with. This case predated the 2001 Cincinnati riots by more than four years. The public criticism of the event was very heated, with one local community leader, Reverend James W. Jones, stating, "They let us blow off steam and then it's back to business as usual. This time the black community should shut this town down. Hell, it's time we stopped playing games." The police were not prosecuted for their actions.

== See also ==
- Cincinnati riots of 2001
- Roger Owensby, Jr
