= Omar Pérez =

Omar Pérez may refer to:

- Omar Pérez (Uruguayan footballer) (born 1976), Uruguayan football midfielder
- Omar Pérez (Argentine footballer) (born 1981), Argentine football attacking midfielder
- Omar Santa-Perez, Puerto Rican Mass shooter
