= Colin MacDonald =

Colin MacDonald may refer to:

- Colin MacGilp MacDonald, British historian and author
- Colin MacDonald (writer), Scottish writer
- Colin MacDonald (musician) (born 1978), lead singer of The Trews
- Colin MacDonald (politician) (1890–1975), Australian politician
- Colin Macdonald, founder of FRED (disk magazine)

== See also ==
- Colin McDonald (disambiguation)
- Augustine Colin Macdonald (1837–1919), Canadian merchant and politician
