= Dominic Choi =

Former Interim Chief of the Los Angeles Police Department

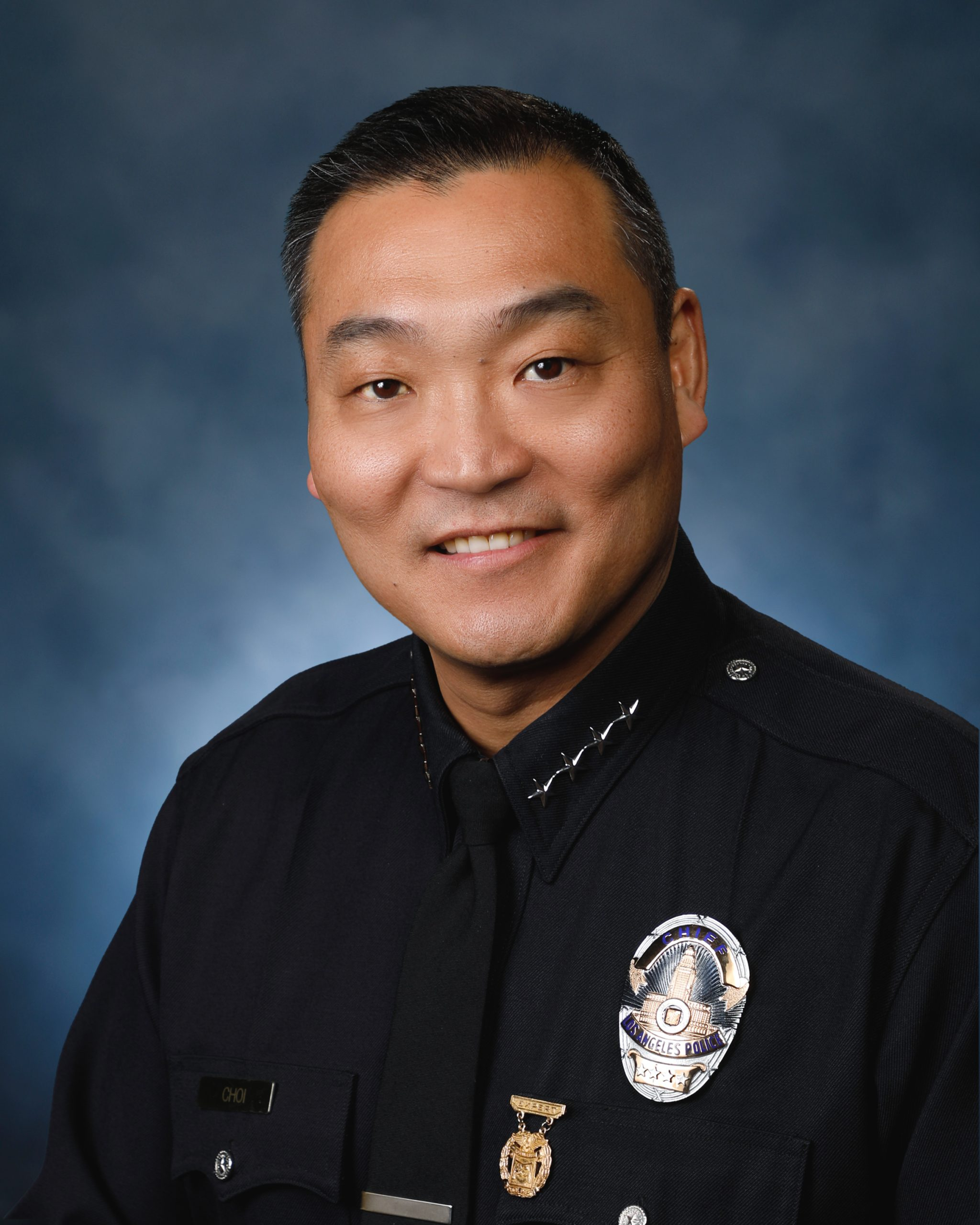
- Official portrait, 2024

Interim Chief of Police of Los Angeles
- In office March 1, 2024 – November 8, 2024
- Mayor: Karen Bass
- Preceded by: Michel Moore
- Succeeded by: Jim McDonnell

Personal details
- Born: Los Angeles, California, U.S.
- Education: University of Southern California
- Police career
- Department: Los Angeles Police Department
- Service years: 1995–present
- Rank: Chief of police – 2024; Sworn in as a Police Officer: 1995

Choi in 2024

Dominic H. Choi is an American law enforcement officer who served as the interim Chief of the Los Angeles Police Department from March 1, 2024, to November 8, 2024. Unanimously appointed by the Los Angeles Board of Police Commissioners, Choi is the first Asian American to have led the Los Angeles Police Department.

== Early life and education ==
Choi was born in Los Angeles to South Korean immigrant parents. He joined the LAPD in 1995, following graduation from the University of Southern California.

== Career ==
In 1999 Choi served in the LAPDs Pacific division. He was featured in the TV show The Real LAPD.

In 2024, Choi was appointed to lead the LAPD after the surprise retirement of Chief Michel Moore.

== See also ==
- Terry Hara, previous highest ranked Asian American in the LAPD (deputy chief, 2008)
- Fred Lau, first Asian American to head a major metropolitan police force in the continental US (SFPD, 1996).
- Harry Lee, first Asian American elected as a major metropolitan sheriff (Jefferson Parish, 1979).
- Dan Liu, first Asian American to head a major metropolitan police force in the US (HPD, 1948).

Police appointments
Preceded by Michel Moore	Interim Chief of Los Angeles Police Department; 2024	Succeeded by Jim McDonnell
