= Terry Hara =

Former Deputy Chief of the Los Angeles Police Department

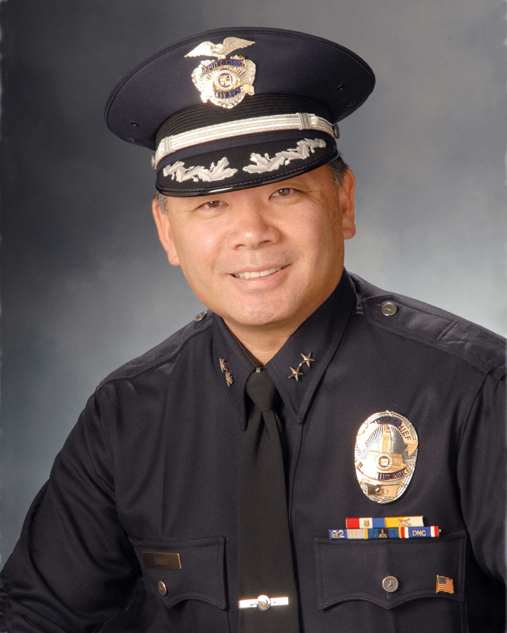
- Official portrait, 2008

Deputy Chief of the Los Angeles Police Department
- In office April 7, 2008 – January 31, 2015
- Chief: William Bratton

Personal details
- Born: Terry Saburo Hara; December 25, 1957 (age 68) Long Beach, California
- Police career
- Department: Los Angeles Police Department
- Service years: 1980–2015
- Rank: Deputy Chief
- Awards: Order of the Rising Sun

Terry Saburo Hara (born December 25, 1957) is an American law enforcement officer who served as the Los Angeles Police Department's first Asian-American deputy chief, and its first Japanese-American captain.

== Early life ==
Hara is a third generation Japanese American born in Long Beach, California to Toshio and Yoneko Hara. Toshio was a Terminal Island fisherman, uprooted from his community and incarcerated during World War II. Terry now serves as president of the Terminal Islanders Association in honor of his family's history.

Hara earned a bachelor of science in Criminal Justice from National University, and is a graduate of the Senior Management Institute for Police Program from Boston University.

== Career ==
Serving as a Police Explorer with the Long Beach Police Department as a youth, Hara credited his Explorer coordinator, Officer Robert Schroeder, for encouraging him to become a police officer.

During his 35 year long career, he served as an undercover narcotics and motor officer, in the Detective Support Division with the bomb squad, Asian Crime Investigation Section, Fugitive Warrant Section, Special Investigation Section, Criminal Conspiracy Section, FBI task force on violent crime, Audit Section, Criminal Investigation Section on counter-terrorism, and Career Criminal Apprehension Section. He commanded the Personnel and Training Bureau, Training Group and Training Division, Southeast and Wilshire Divisions, and served as the Deputy Chief and Commanding Officer of the West Bureau.

As the highest ranking former motor officer in LAPD's history, the LAPD built a custom Harley Davidson Electra Glide FLHTP painted with his name and two stars on the front fender in honor of the LAPD motor unit's 100th anniversary in 2009. Upon his retirement, it was taken out of service and donated to the LAPD Police Museum.

Hara's ribbon bar indicates participation in the 1984 Summer Olympics, the 1987 Papal visit by Pope John Paul II, the 1992 Civil Emergency, the 1994 Northridge earthquake, and the 2000 Democratic National Convention.

== Community service ==
In addition to his role as president of the Terminal Islanders Association, Hara served as chairman of the board for the Los Angeles Police Museum and the Japan America Society of Southern California. He is a past president of the Japanese American Optimist Club of Los Angeles and a two-time president of the Nisei Week Foundation. He is a board member for the Go For Broke National Education Center and the National Association of Asian American Law Enforcement Commanders, a member of the US-Japan Council, and advisor to Japan House Los Angeles.

Hara was a candidate in the 2013 Los Angeles City Council elections, losing out to Curren Price in the 9th council district.

In recognition of his service to the Japanese American community, Hara has been awarded the Japanese Order of the Rising Sun with Gold Rays and Rosette in 2015. Additionally, he has been awarded the 2007 SoCal Cherry Blossom Festival’s Senator Daniel Inouye Leadership Award, the KCET Local Heroes Award in 2010, and the Community Leadership Award by the Japan America Society of Southern California in 2011.

== See also ==
- Dominic Choi, first Asian American interim chief of the LAPD in 2024
- Heather Fong, first Asian American woman to head a major metropolitan police force in the US (SFPD, 2004).
- Fred Lau, first Asian American to head a major metropolitan police force in the continental US (SFPD, 1996).
- Harry Lee, first Asian American elected as a major metropolitan sheriff (Jefferson Parish, 1979).
- Dan Liu, first Asian American to head a major metropolitan police force in the US (HPD, 1948).
