= John Mack (civic leader) =

American civic leader (1937–2018)

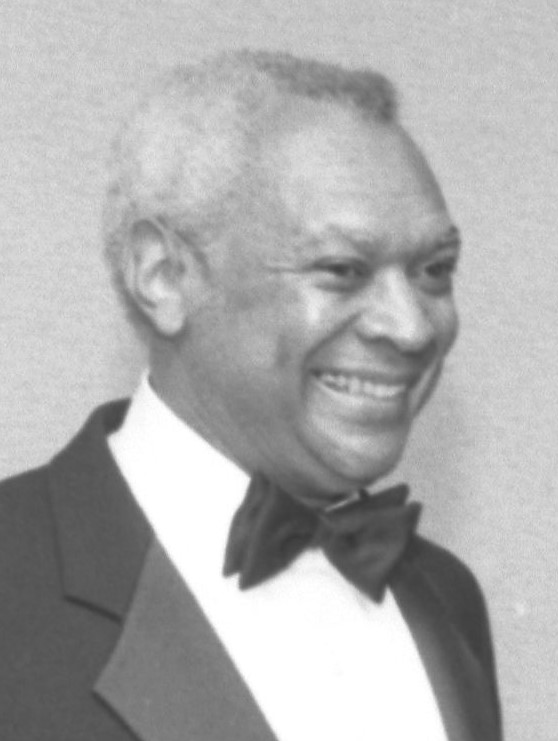
- Mack in 1986
- Born: John Wesley Mack; January 6, 1937; Kingstree, South Carolina, U.S.
- Died: June 21, 2018 (aged 81); Los Angeles, California, U.S.
- Education: North Carolina A&T State University; Clark Atlanta University
- Occupation: Civic leader
- Spouse: Harriett Johnson
- Children: 3

John Wesley Mack (January 6, 1937 – June 21, 2018) was an American activist in the civil rights movement. He was the executive director of the National Urban League chapter in Flint, Michigan, from 1964 to 1969. He served as the president of its Los Angeles chapter from 1969 to 2005, and as a member of the Los Angeles Board of Police Commissioners from 2005 to 2013. He was an advocate for equal opportunities in education, law enforcement and economic empowerment for blacks and other minorities.

== Early life ==
Mack was born on January 6, 1937, in Kingstree, South Carolina, to Abram Mack, a Methodist minister, and Ruth Wynita, a school teacher. Mack and his parents then moved to Darlington, South Carolina.

== Education ==
He attended North Carolina A&T State University, where he was the president of the NAACP chapter. He graduated with an applied sociology bachelor's degree in 1959. He subsequently earned a master's degree in social work from Clark Atlanta University, and an honorary doctorate of management degree from the Claremont Graduate University School of Education. Mack was a member of the black Greek-lettered college fraternity Alpha Phi Alpha.

== Career ==
Mack first moved to Oxnard, California, and he worked at the Camarillo State Mental Hospital where his occupation was a psychiatrist social worker for 4 years. From 1964 to 1969, he was the executive director of the Flint Urban League in Flint, Michigan, where he focused on "fair housing and voter registration issues."

Mack later returned to California, where he served as the president of the Los Angeles Urban League from 1969 to 2005. As a president and member of the organization he fought against school segregation and advocated for African American worker rights. He co-founded the Los Angeles Black Leadership Coalition on Education in 1977. During the 80s he "became vice president of the United Way Corporation of Council Executives". In the aftermath of the 1992 Los Angeles riots, Mack showed President George H. W. Bush around South Los Angeles. At the time, Mack and Mayor Tom Bradley were criticized by young activists for being too removed from the real life experiences of everyday African Americans; Mack rejected the criticism. Over the next few years, he helped rebuild the area by "renovat[ing] 63% of damaged businesses, created jobs," and especially rebuilt the Crenshaw Boulevard corridor. He became an advocate for neighborliness between blacks and Hispanics in the area. In 1995, however, after O. J. Simpson was tried and acquitted for the murders of his ex-wife Nicole Brown Simpson and her friend Ron Goldman despite circumstantial and physical evidence pointing to Simpson's guilt, Mack expressed his support for Simpson, and congratulated the predominantly-black jury for acquitting Simpson as a way of creating a "level racial playing field" in the country, leading to harsh criticism.

Mack was the president of the board of police commissioners of the Los Angeles Police Department from 2005 to 2007, and as a member through 2013. Under his leadership, the commission became the "driving force" behind several LAPD improvements, including video cameras in squad cars to increase accountability among patrol officers, and the department achieving full compliance with the federal consent decree that had been in place since 2001. He subsequently served on the Los Angeles City Planning Commission.

In 2018, Mack supported the nomination of Michel Moore as the new Chief of the Los Angeles Police Department. In particular, he stressed Moore's expertise in community policing and his dedication to "eradicat[ing] racism and brutality within the LAPD."

== Personal life, death, and legacy ==
With his wife Harriett Johnson, Mack had three children. She died in 2016 at the age of 79.

Mack was 81 when he died of cancer on June 21, 2018, at Kaiser Permanente in Los Angeles at Cedars-Sinai Medical Center.

For Los Angeles Mayor Eric Garcetti, Mack "made history with a fierce determination to pursue justice, an unshakable commitment to equality, and an unbreakable bond with the community he worked tirelessly to uplift every day of his remarkable life." The Los Angeles Times called him "one of the most powerful voices on Los Angeles police reform."

John W. Mack Elementary School, part of the Los Angeles Unified School District since its 2005 inception, is named in his honor.
