= Michel Moore =

Los Angeles police chief, 2018–2024

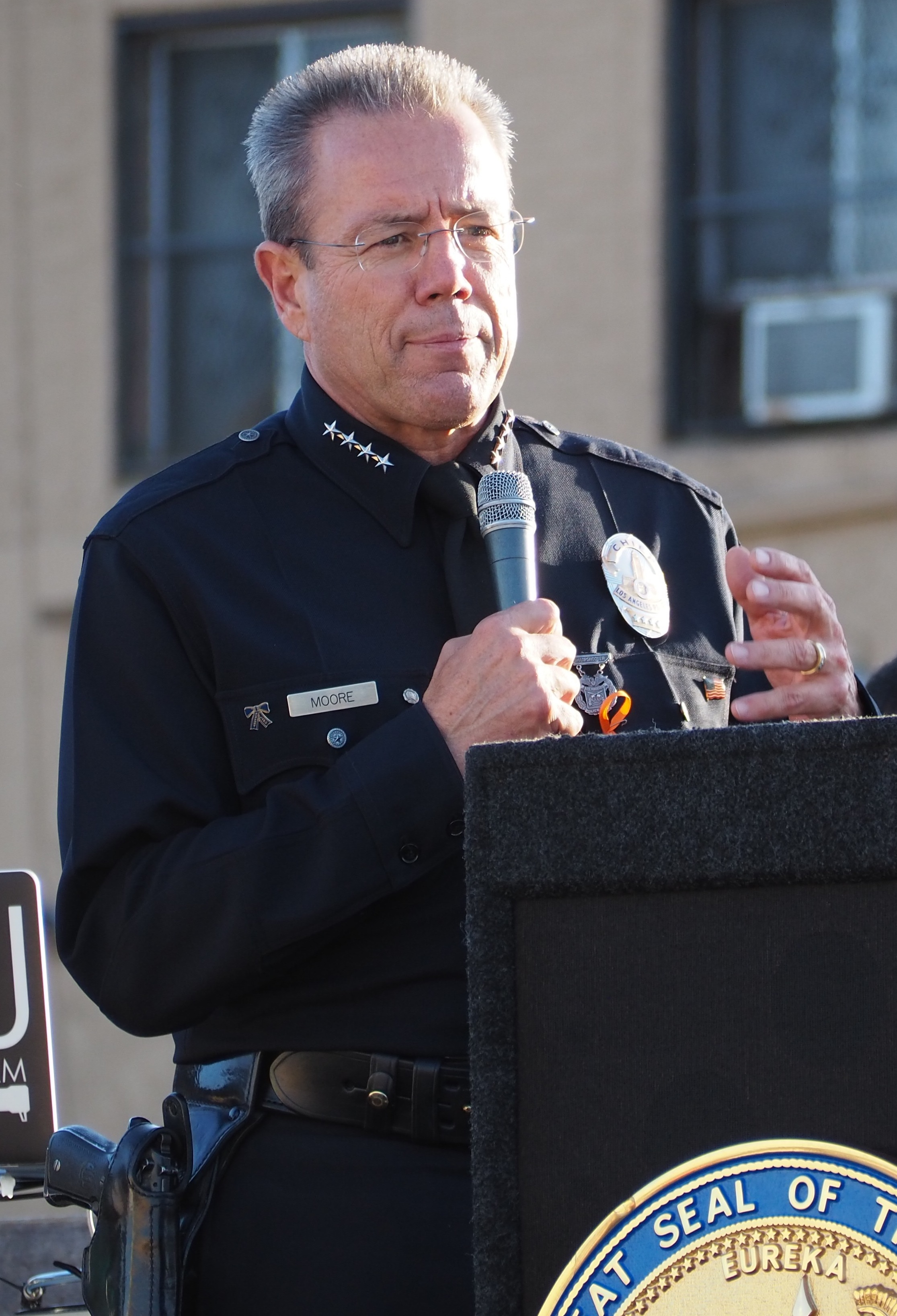

57th Chief of Police of Los Angeles
- In office June 27, 2018 – March 1, 2024
- Mayor: Eric Garcetti; Karen Bass
- Preceded by: Charlie Beck
- Succeeded by: Dominic Choi

Personal details
- Born: Michel Rey Sanchotena; July 2, 1960 (age 66) Porterville, California, U.S.
- Education: University of Redlands (BBA, MBA)
- Nickname: "Mike"
- Police career
- Department: Los Angeles Police Department
- Service years: 42
- Rank: Police officer – 1981; Captain – 1998; Commander – 2002; Deputy chief – 2004; Assistant chief – 2010; First assistant chief - 2016; Chief of police – 2018
- Awards: Los Angeles P.D. Medal of Valor; Los Angeles P.D. Police Medal for Heroism; Los Angeles P.D. Police Star; Los Angeles P.D. Police Meritorious Service Medal

Michel Rey Moore (né Sanchotena; born July 2, 1960) is an American retired law enforcement officer who served as the chief of the Los Angeles Police Department (LAPD) from 2018 until 2024.

On June 4, 2018, Eric Garcetti, mayor of Los Angeles, appointed Moore to the post of chief of the LAPD, and the appointment was ratified by the Los Angeles City Council on June 27, 2018. Moore succeeded Charlie Beck as the Chief of Police after Beck's retirement on June 27. He has worked for the LAPD since 1981. He stepped down at the end of February 2024 to spend more time with his family.

== Early life and education ==
Moore is the son of a Spanish father, and his original last name is Sanchotena. "Michel" is the Basque and French form of "Michael", and Moore pronounces his first name as "Michael". He took his stepfather's last name after encountering prejudice in the South. The second of five children, Moore graduated from high school in Arkansas. He holds bachelor's and master's degrees in business administration from the University of Redlands.

== Career ==
Moore was appointed to the Los Angeles Police Department in 1981. He climbed through the ranks at the LAPD, gaining a promotion to Captain in 1998 and an assignment as the Commanding Officer of the LAPD Rampart Division following the arrest of Rafael Perez. Moore was promoted to Commander in 2002 (following that promotion he was initially assigned as the Assistant Commanding Officer of Operations-Valley Bureau, followed by a term as the Assistant to the Director, Office of Operations), Deputy Chief in 2004 (assigned as the Commanding Officer of Operations-West Bureau, later transferring to Operations-Valley Bureau), and Assistant Chief in 2010. As a recently promoted Assistant Chief, Moore was assigned as the Director – Office of Special Operations (overseeing the department's Detective Bureau and Counter-Terrorism and Special Operations Bureau), and in 2015, Moore transferred to be the Director – Office of Administrative Services (overseeing the department's fiscal, personnel, training, and various support operations). In 2016, Moore was assigned as the First Assistant Chief and transferred to be the Director – Office of Operations, responsible for overseeing the department's geographic bureaus and patrol divisions which provide uniformed and investigative services to the city.

During his career in the LAPD, Moore has received numerous commendations and awards for his police service including the department's Medal of Valor, the Police Medal, the Police Star, and the Police Meritorious Service Medal.

In 2016, Moore was a finalist to be selected as Chief of the Dallas Police Department, which the position was eventually awarded to U. Renee Hall. Moore's nomination was supported by black civic leader John Mack, who stressed Moore's expertise in community policing and his dedication to "eradicat[ing] racism and brutality within the LAPD."

On October 16, 2018, Moore held a news conference in which he provided an update on his first 100 Days in Office. During the news conference, he discussed various topics, including his pledge that the Department would police with purpose, compassion and partnerships and build upon the legacy established by Chief Charlie Beck.

Following the George Floyd protests in Los Angeles, he said "We didn't have people mourning the death of this man, George Floyd — we had people capitalizing. His death is on their hands as much as it is those officers." This led to citizens reaction at the Police Commission meeting where Moore sat for nine hours in silence while citizens asked for his resignation.

In May 2021, Moore announced that an internal personnel investigation into the sharing of a Valentine-style meme of George Floyd had resulted in an officer being ordered to a Board of Rights, with Moore recommending termination. Moore stated it was the "most aggressive act" he could take, and hoped it would send a clear message that the LAPD does not tolerate such behavior because of "how corrosive it is to the public trust".

Police appointments
Preceded by Charlie Beck	Chief of Los Angeles Police Department; 2018-2024	Succeeded by Dominic Choi
