= Chief of the Honolulu Police Department =

Head of the Honolulu Police Department

Chief of The Honolulu Police Department
- Incumbent; David Lazar since July 2, 2026
- Honolulu Police Department
- Reports to: Honolulu Police Commission
- Seat: City and County of Honolulu, Hawaii, U.S.
- Appointer: Honolulu Police Commission, with consent of city council.
- Formation: 1846 (Kingdom of Hawaii); 1932 (under current structure)
- First holder: Charles F. Weeber (1932)
- Salary: $205,800
- Website: www.honolulupd.org

The Chief of the Honolulu Police Department is the head and senior-most officer to serve in the Honolulu Police Department (HPD).

Chief David Lazar was sworn in on 2 July, 2026, accepting command from Deputy Chief Rade K. Vanic, who served as interim chief following Chief Joe Logan’s retirement. Lazar previously served as assistant chief with the San Francisco Police Department and became Honolulu's 13th sworn chief.

The chief of police is appointed by the Honolulu Police Commission and reports to the Honolulu City Council.

== List of police chiefs ==
Chief	Term began	Term ended	Notes
Charles F. Weeber	January 27, 1932	August 9, 1932	
William A. Gabrielson	August 9, 1932	June 1, 1946	
William Hoopai	June 1, 1946	October 1, 1948	First Native Hawaiian chief
Dan Liu	October 1, 1948	June 30, 1969	First Asian-American Chief; HPD's longest serving chief
Francis Keala	December 24, 1969	April 1, 1983	
Douglas Gibb	June 20, 1983	December 21, 1989	
Michael S. Nakamura	August 1, 1990	December 30, 1997	
Lee D. Donohue	April 13, 1998	July 1, 2004	
Boisse P. Correa	August 27, 2004	August 27, 2009	
Louis M. Kealoha	November 25, 2009	February 28, 2017	Convicted and removed for corruption.
Susan Ballard	November 1, 2017	May 31, 2021	First female chief
Arthur "Joe" Logan	June 14, 2022	July 31, 2025	
David Lazar	July 2, 2026	incumbent	

== See also ==
- Chief constable
- Chief police officer
- Police commissioner
- Sheriffs in Hawaii
