= Cincinnati Police Department =

Law enforcement agency in Ohio, U.S.

City of Cincinnati Police Department
- Patch of the Cincinnati Police Department

- Flag of the City of Cincinnati
- Common name: Cincinnati Police Department
- Abbreviation: CPD

Agency overview
- Formed: 1859

Jurisdictional structure
- Operations jurisdiction: Cincinnati, Ohio, United States
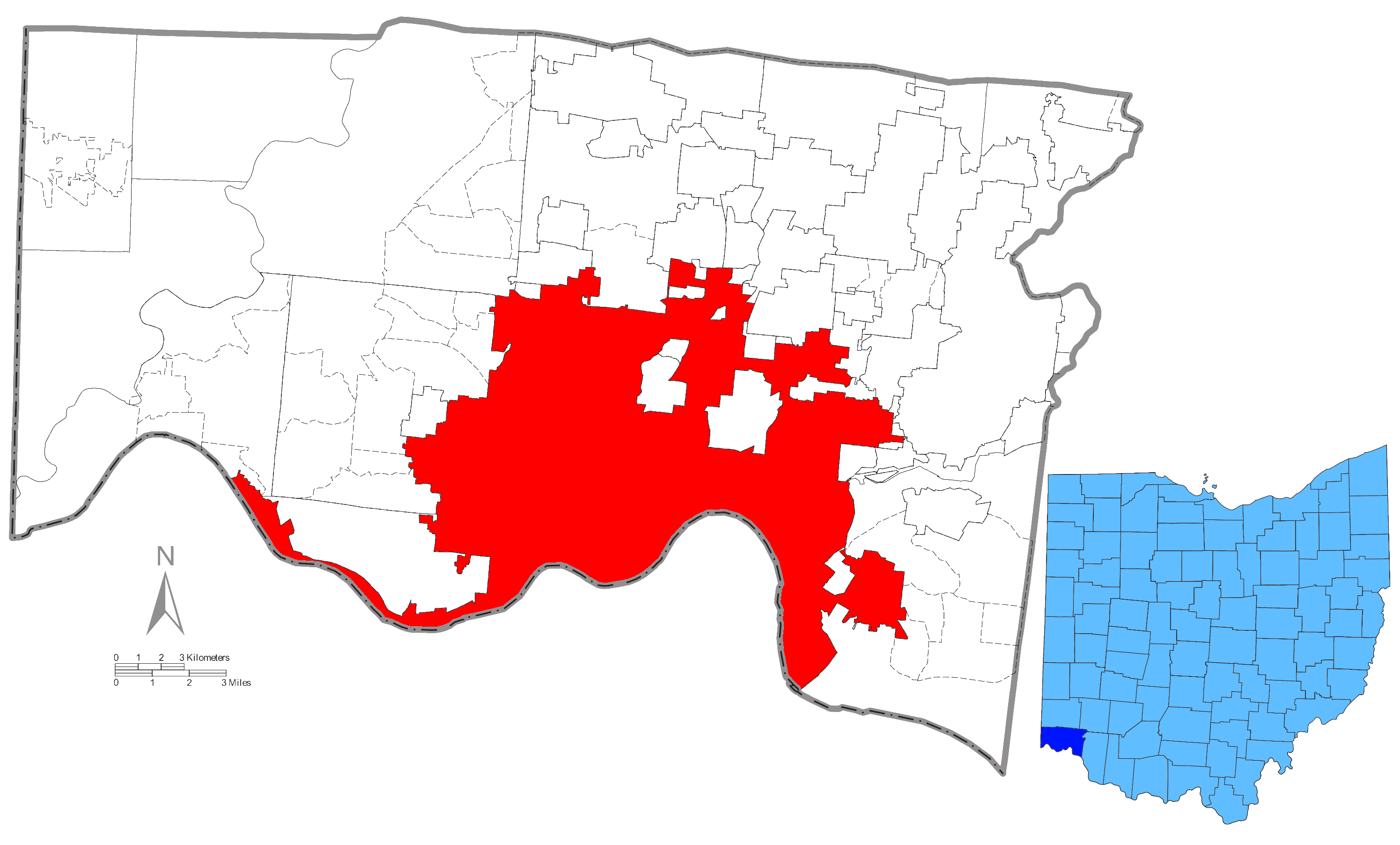
- Map of City of Cincinnati Police Department's jurisdiction
- Area: 79.54 sq mi (206.0 km^{2})
- Population: 309,513
- Legal jurisdiction: Cincinnati, Ohio, U.S.
- General nature: Local civilian police

Operational structure
- Headquarters: Cincinnati, Ohio
- Police officers: ▼944 of 1,091 (2025)
- Unsworn members: 125
- Agency executive: Adam Hennie, Interim Chief of Police

Website
- www.cincinnati-oh.gov/police

The Cincinnati Police Department is the primary law enforcement agency of Cincinnati, Ohio. The department has 1,053 sworn officers and 119 non-sworn employees.

== History ==
When Cincinnati incorporated as a village in 1802, a ‘night watch’ was established, primarily to guard against fire, but also to ensure the peace. The organization of a police force, similar to those in larger cities, came in 1859 with the appointment of the first police commissioner.

Cincinnati also has a museum dedicated to their police force, known as The Greater Cincinnati Police Historical Society Museum.

The department adopted the Smith & Wesson Model 5906 9mm handgun based on a recommendation made in 1987, following a request to the director of public safety by the Fraternal Order of Police President. In late 1988, it was determined that the Smith & Wesson Model 5906 9mm handgun would be chosen by CPD. The Model 5906 pistol would remain in service until it was replaced by the current sidearm, the Smith & Wesson M&P (also chambered in 9mm) in 2006.

In 2012, after 154 years, the Cincinnati Police Department finally replaced their white shirts with blue shirts. White hats were removed temporarily, but white hats on patrol were reinstated in 2013.

Former Chief Jeffery Blackwell was fired by the City of Cincinnati as police chief on September 9, 2015. Eliot Isacc was sworn in as the CPD's Police Chief on December 10, 2015.

=== 2001 Cincinnati riots ===
The 2001 Cincinnati riots were a reaction to the fatal shooting in Cincinnati of Timothy Thomas, a 19-year-old black male, by Steven Roach, a white police officer, during an on-foot pursuit by several officers. Businesses were looted, storefronts damaged, and small fires were set. Since the riots, Cincinnati has set city records for murders and other violent crime, though the relationship between such crime and the riots is not clear. In 2006, 89 people were murdered in Cincinnati, setting a record for most murders since city records were kept.

=== Racial profiling ===
A local independent magazine, City Beat, published research that an "analysis of 141,000 traffic citations written by Cincinnati Police in a 22-month period found black drivers twice as likely as whites to be cited for driving without a license, twice as likely to be cited for not wearing a seat belt and four times as likely to be cited for driving without proof of insurance."

In December 2007, the RAND Corporation published a review of traffic stops found no evidence of a department-wide pattern of racial bias in the decision to stop. When looking at what happens after the stop, black residents in Cincinnati are searched at a higher rate than non-blacks in Cincinnati, and they are stopped for longer periods of time. However, much of these differences can be attributed to factors such as the location and time of the stop, the reason for the stop, and whether the driver in the traffic stop had a valid driver's license. When RAND accounted for these factors and matched stops of black drivers with stops of similarly situated non-black drivers, RAND found that officers searched black and "matched" non-black drivers at nearly the same rates in situations where officers have discretion whether or not to search.

=== Owensby, Irons & Tyehimba ===
A black businessman, Bomani Tyehimba, filed a lawsuit in 1999 against the city of Cincinnati. He claimed that police illegally ordered him out of his car, handcuffed him and held a gun to his head during a routine traffic stop. Unlike previous cases, there was a shift to introduce a policy and procedure change in CPD behavior.

The case was escalated in relevance when two further incidents occurred. Roger Owensby Jr. died November 7, 2000, while struggling with police. The Hamilton County Coroner's Office found that he died due to manual asphyxiation from a chokehold either while the chokehold was being applied or afterwards from his injuries and the way he was positioned in the back of the cruiser. Early in the morning hours, after Owensby's death, Jeffery Irons, another black male, was killed after taking a sergeant's gun and shooting another officer.

=== False arrest ===
In August 2010, Detective Julian Steele was convicted of falsely arresting a teenage boy. The chain of events led to the detective receiving oral sex from the boy's mother. Steele told investigators he arrested the youngster "to get access to his mom." The jury did not convict the detective of rape. After exhausting all appeals, Steele was sent to jail for four years in 2014.

=== Shooting of David Hebert ===
On April 18, 2011, musician David Hebert was shot by police sergeant Andrew Mitchell following a report of an aggravated burglary with a sword. The report proved unfounded. The department's Firearms Discharge Review Board as well as The Cincinnati Enquirer found that the officers had violated procedure and training by failing to communicate or plan when they came dangerously close to Hebert. Hebert was complying with another officer's orders to stand, step towards him, and produce a knife when he was fatally shot by Mitchell, who admitted he was not listening to those commands, and so saw compliance as a threat.

Controversy in the ongoing legal case later surrounded Mitchell when it was revealed that he had previously been involved with a lawsuit involving the use of a taser on a teenage boy in 2008, and a drunk driving coverup scandal while a federal civil rights lawsuit was still pending against him in the Hebert case.

In 2015, the City of Cincinnati, Mitchell and other involved officers settled a civil rights lawsuit, apologizing for the death and admitting officers' responsibility in the tragedy. At the conclusion of the lawsuit, the City of Cincinnati acknowledged in a statement that Hebert had not been carrying a sword as reported, and agreed that there was no conclusive evidence to show that he had intended to attack officers with a knife found at the scene. The city viewed both Hebert's and the officers' actions as contributing to the fatal shooting.

=== Bribery for promotions ===
In June 2019, Captain Michael Savard, a thirty-year veteran with the department was arrested on federal corruption charges. The local US Attorney charged Savard took money to ensure certain police officers were promoted.

=== 2020 protest arrests ===
One notable debacle occurred with the arrest of Spring Grove residents Hannah and Lexi Wilkins, the latter of whom is diabetic. At 6 pm, they were protesting for Black Lives Matter, when they heard about the curfew. They tried to get back to their car, but had forgotten where they parked, so a fellow protester offered to give them a ride. However, the car was stopped by the police, and all its passengers were taken outside. Lexi started to have a diabetic attack, and asked a police officer if she could get insulin from her bag, which she left in the car. The police repeatedly denied her requests and mocked her intelligence. The attack worsened until she was hyperventilating and losing consciousness, during which the police handcuffed her arms behind her back and forced her to stand. The police officer lied to her that there would be a medic where they would be bused.

=== Killings of Ryan Hinton and Larry Henderson ===
On May 1, 2025, officers with the Cincinnati Police shot and killed an 18-year-old man named Ryan Hinton. CPD officers in the East Price Hill neighborhood approached a vehicle containing four teenagers, including Hinton, that was reported stolen from northern Kentucky. After the vehicle stopped in an apartment parking lot, an officer perused a fleeing Ryan Hinton, shooting him as he ran towards said officer from between two dumpsters. Body camera footage showed Hinton holding a gun, though an analysis from The Cincinnati Enquirer said it was difficult to tell where it was pointed when the officer shot him. The officer fired five shots, striking Hinton twice. Hamilton county prosecutor Connie Pillich cleared the officer of wrongdoing claiming that he used justified and legal force. Connie Pillich would become involved again shortly afterwards, serving as the prosecution against Rodney Hinton Jr.

The following day, May 2, CPD showed the body camera footage to Ryan Hinton's father, Rodney Hinton Jr., who was reportedly "very distraught" and could not finish watching the video, according to an attorney. Later that day, a recently retired Hamilton County Sheriff's deputy, Larry Henderson, was struck by a car and killed while directing traffic. Rodney Hinton was arrested and charged with aggravated murder for killing Henderson. He was ordered held without bond.

On May 8, Hamilton County prosecutors upgraded the charges against Rodney Hinton, adding a second count of aggravated murder, one count of murder and two counts of felonious assault. Prosecutor Connie Pillich announced that she was seeking the death penalty. On May 8, Cincinnati Police chief Teresa Theetge cited Marsy's Law, a state law to protect the rights of crime victims, as the reason the police have not identified the officer who shot Ryan Hinton.

On October 23, 2026 after 4 days of deliberation, the jury reached had reached a verdict finding that Rodney Hinton was guilty of murder, felonious assault, and reckless homicide. Defense attorney Clyde Bennett would later vow to appeal the verdict.

== Organization ==
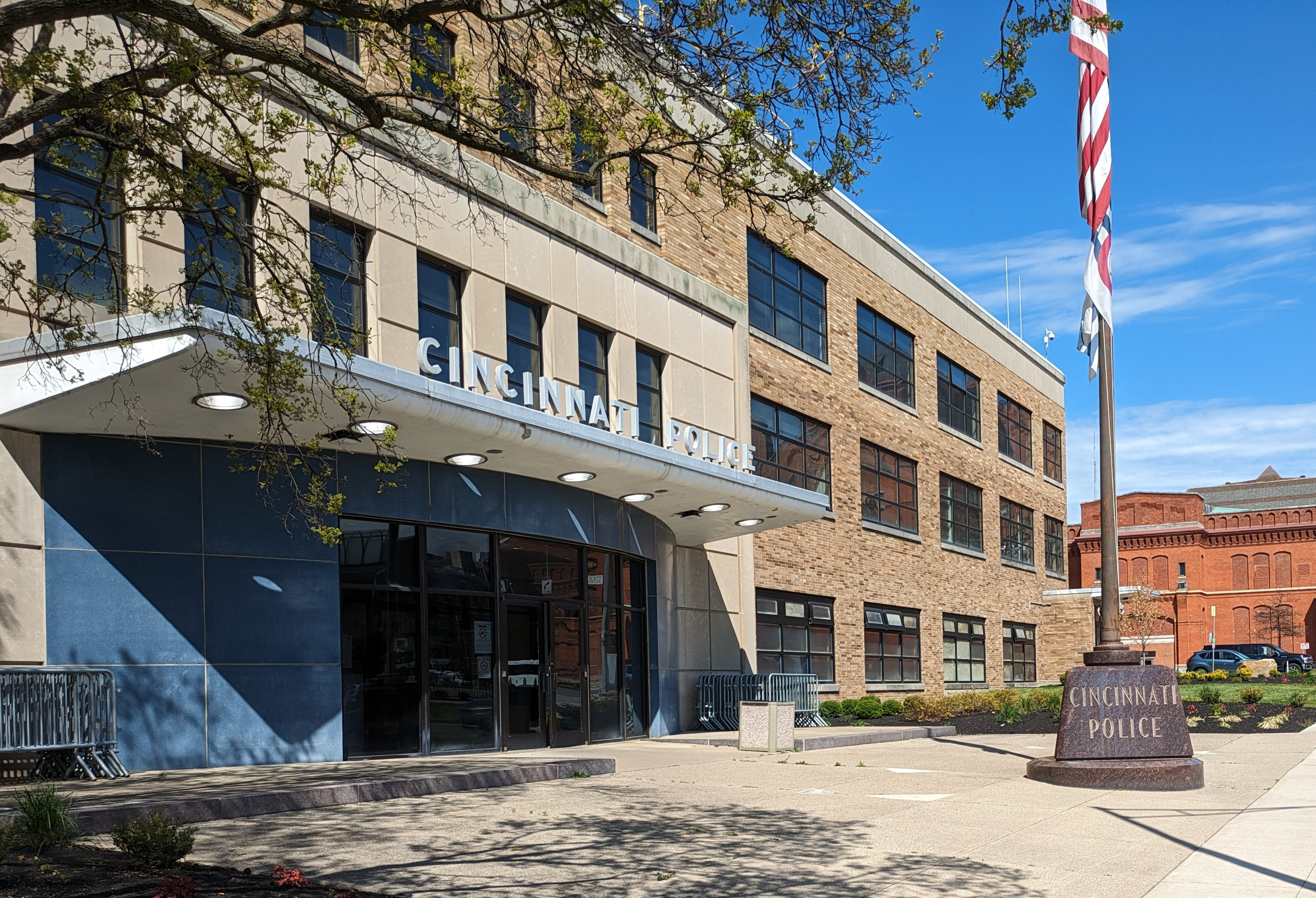
Cincinnati Police Department District 1 headquarters main entrance at 310 Ezzard Charles Drive. Cincinnati Music Hall is at far right.

Under the command of the police chief, the police department's responsibilities are divided among four bureaus: Administration, Patrol, Investigations, and Support.

=== Investigations ===
The Investigations section consists of the Special Investigations Section and the Criminal Investigation Section. This bureau handles investigations and gathers intelligence involving vice activity, homicides, sex crimes, crimes against children and property crimes.

=== Patrol ===
The Patrol section performs all primary police functions. Bureau personnel respond to citizen requests for police assistance, enforce criminal and traffic laws, investigate criminal activity, take offense reports and regulate non-criminal conduct. It consists of the five police districts, a Night Chief, Patrol Administration, Community Oriented Policing, Special Services Section and SWAT.

=== Rank structure and insignia ===
The Cincinnati Police Department uses the following ranks:

Title	Insignia	Description
Chief of Police (Colonel)		Chief of Department
Executive Assistant Chief (Lieutenant Colonel)		Administration Bureau Commander
Assistant Chief (Lieutenant Colonel)		Departmental Bureau Commander
Captain		District or Section Commander
Lieutenant		Shift or Unit Commander
Sergeant		Squad Commander. Manage relief officers and specialized units
Police Specialist		Rank abolished. Remaining specialists will hold the rank until promotion or retirement
Police Officer		Sworn officer assigned to patrol or investigative duties
Police Recruit		Personnel in the police academy

The rank of major was used in the early 1900s until approximately 1951.

The rank of detective was used in the late 1800s until 1984. In 1965, it was decided that the detective rank would be abolished through attrition. The remaining detectives held the rank until promotion or retirement. The last officer holding the rank of detective retired in 1984. The title of detective is still used for police officers and police specialists assigned to investigative positions.

The rank of police specialist was formally established in 1965. The first promotions to police specialist were in 1966. On May 6, 2011, it was decided that the rank of police specialist would be abolished through attrition. The remaining police specialists will hold the rank until promotion or retirement.

== See also ==
- Crime in Cincinnati
- Police Women of Cincinnati – 2011 TLC documentary series featuring four CPD female officers

State:

- List of law enforcement agencies in Ohio
