= Crime in Cincinnati =

Cincinnati, Ohio
- Crime rates* (2024)

Violent crimes
- Homicide: 21,8
- Rape: 92.31^{***}
- Robbery: 397.47
- Aggravated assault: 547.73
- Total violent crime: 1155.62

Property crimes
- Burglary: 976.53
- Larceny-theft: 3425.59
- Motor vehicle theft: 474.38
- Arson
- Total property crime: 4782.5
- Notes *Number of reported crimes per 100,000 population. ** For Arson: the FBI determined that the agency's data were underreported. Consequently, those data are not included in this table: Revised definition; Source: FBI 2019 UCR data

Crime in Cincinnati, Ohio has been a concern of residents since the 18th century.

== Earliest years ==
The first recorded crime in Cincinnati's history was a petty theft in 1789. Under the judgement of William McMillan, informally appointed justice of the peace, one Patrick Grimes was sentenced to twenty-nine lashes after being caught stealing cucumbers. That occurred during the first year of the settlement, then still named "Losantiville", when food and other resources were extremely scarce.

Controversies over law enforcement quickly followed the establishment of government in the community: the military commander at Fort Washington deemed the region to be under his government, rejecting any authority set up by the settlers. When a second crime was reported to Judge McMillan, the accused fled to the fort for refuge, and the commander ordered Losantiville's court to renounce its jurisdiction. The judge replied with a message suggesting that the commander mind his own business, and blows ensued when a detachment of soldiers was sent to arrest the judge.

However, permanent civilian law enforcement was established soon after the incident. In August 1788, the Northwest Territory legislature, meeting in Marietta, had enacted an enabling act creating a Court of Quarter Sessions for the region, and local residents quickly took advantage of the law's provisions; William McMillan was named one of the court's first judges.

== Crime over time ==
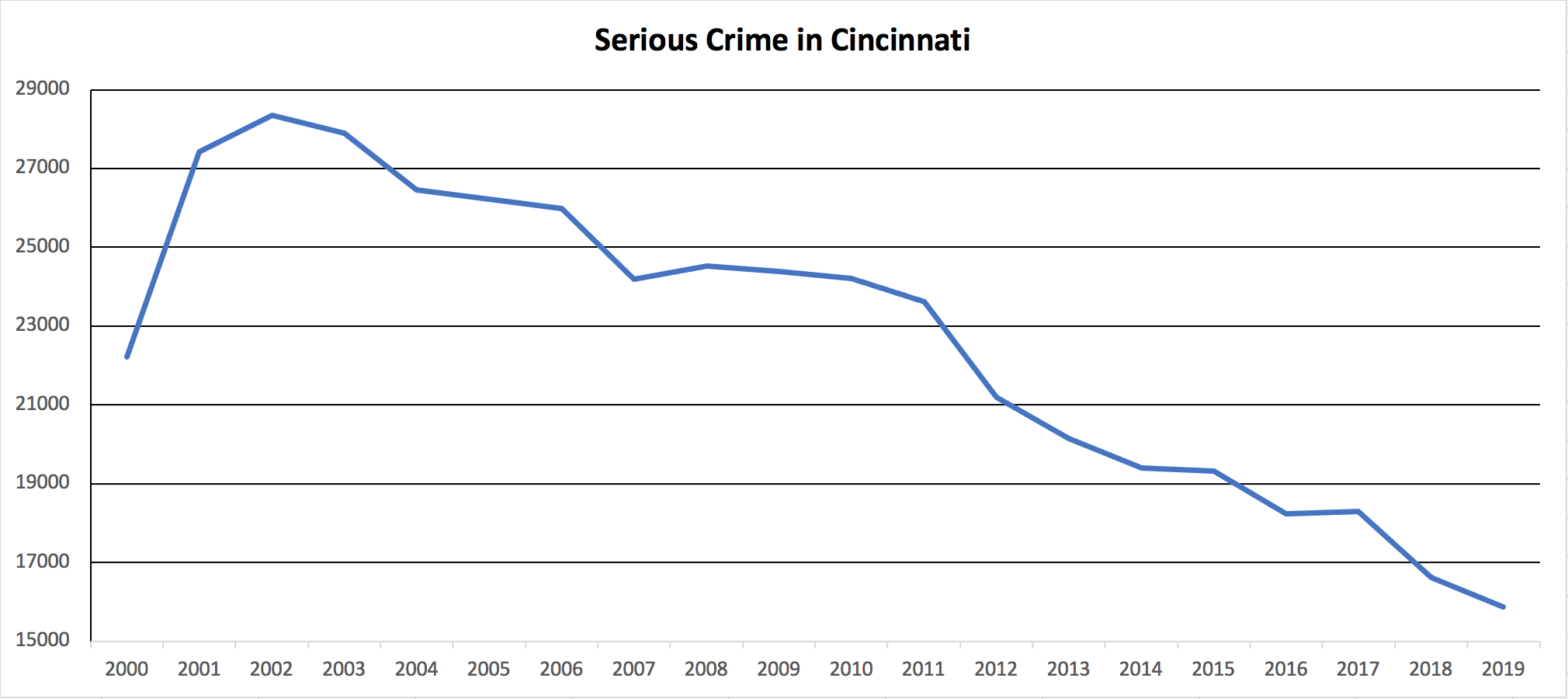
This is a graph of part one crimes that were reported from 2000 to 2019. Part one crimes consist of homicide, rape, robbery, aggravated assault, arson, burglary, larceny, and motor vehicle theft.

Overall violent crime reached an all-time low in 2022; rape and robbery went up that year, while homicides and aggravated assaults decreased. Property crimes went up in 2022, primarily driven by an increase in auto thefts.

Using FBI data for 2023-2024, Cincinnati ranks 14th in the 100 most populous cities in the U.S. for overall crime rate (includes both violent and property crime).

Homicides reached a record high 96 in 2020, and the record was matched in 2021. There were 87 homicides in 2022; of those, 78 involved a firearm.

The City of Cincinnati publishes several public safety dashboards online:

- Fire & Rescue
- Emergency Medical Services
- Police Calls for Service
- 911 Call Performance
- Alternative Response to Crisis
- Reported Crime
- Reported Shootings
- Traffic Crashes
- Police Firearm Discharge
- Use of Force
- Assaults on Officers
- Traffic Stops
- Pedestrian Stops
- Closed Citizen Complaints

Year	Homicides
2010	72
2011	67
2012	53
2013	74
2014	63
2015	71
2016	62
2017	71
2018	61
2019	73
2020	94
2021	94
2022	87
