= Roger Owensby Jr. =

Roger Owensby Jr. (March 27, 1971 – November 7, 2000) was an African American man who died November 7, 2000, after a foot chase and scuffle with the Cincinnati Police Department in the Roselawn neighborhood of Cincinnati, Ohio.

== Biography ==
Owensby was a United States Army sergeant in the Persian Gulf War, serving eight years. He had been an army cook and also served in Bosnia. He left behind a 9-year-old daughter at the time of his death and was survived by his parents and other siblings. He had no previous police record. On 21 May 2004, US District Court Judge Spieghel held that the Cincinnati's City Council had failed to protect the prisoner's health. On a second count he also held that the police were negligent in failing to follow procedure and Owensby died. On 14 June 2004, the family sued the Council for damages of US $4.5 million, citing police brutality as cause of death. In a landmark case decision, the court eventually decided after almost two years deliberations on 16 March 2006 to reach a settlement for US $6.5 million with the Owensby family.

== Death ==
At 8 pm on election day November 7, 2000, in his home town, Owensby was leaving the Sunoco Mini-Mart in Bond Hill when two police officers stopped and searched him for approximately 15 minutes. He then fled and they gave chase. After the ensuing struggle Owensby was tackled by several officers, forced to the ground and handcuffed. He was put into the police car, where he subsequently died. The two main officers involved were Officer Robert 'Blaine' Jorg and Officer Patrick Caton. Several details came out during the investigation through independent media inquiries and contrary citizen testimony about what happened during the event. No officers who was involved in the incident was convicted of any criminal wrongdoing, but all were disciplined for various levels of dereliction of duty or violation of police procedures. The Hamilton County Cononer's Office found that Owensby died, "... either from a chokehold or from officers piling on top of him."

Roger Owensby Sr. (father of Roger Jr.) wrote to Cincinnati Mayor Charlie Luken advising that he had been contacted by witnesses who claimed to have been harassed and intimidated by police and investigators. The Hamilton County Prosecutor stated that he was unaware of the letter but that he had met with the Owensby family to keep them updated,

The individual civil (local) cases against the police officers Jorg and Caton began concurrently October 22, 2001. Both cases ended in November 2001, with Caton being acquitted and Jorg's case ending in a mistrial. On November 6, 2001, the Owensby family filed a federal lawsuit stating the police had violated Roger's civil rights, claiming he was "assaulted, tortured and killed" by police.

The Owensby incident was a pivotal moment that fueled the racial tension becoming one of the causative factors of the 2001 Cincinnati Riots. Owensby was the twelfth black male who died in custody or confrontations with police since 1995. While the criminal trial was proceeding, an unarmed 19-year-old black man, Timothy Thomas, was shot by Cincinnati Police Department Officer Steven Roach during an on-foot pursuit. The combination of the rising tensions from the high-profile Owensby case and Thomas' death led to the 2001 Cincinnati Riots.

== Civil trial ==
=== Indictments ===
The charges of manslaughter and misdemeanor assault were filed against the officers Jorg and Caton on January 3, 2001, for Owensby's death. A point of contention was which officer, Jorg or Caton, may have caused Owensby's death through improper use of force. Jorg and Caton had individual trials often sharing the same evidence and witnesses, but neither officer was found to have caused his death.

=== Testimony ===
In the trials of both Jorg and Caton there was a lack of consistent corroborating testimony by witnesses. A witness in the trial of Officer Jorg testified that he had used a choke hold on Owensby while Jorg testified that he only held the head to protect him.

The Coroner testified that Owensby died from mechanical asphyxiation (suffocation) but could not confirm that the body showed bruises from punches as stated by witnesses.

There was also conflicting evidence from police witnesses. The deputy coroner testified that forensic evidence showed that Owensby was dead when placed in the police cruiser, but officers stated that Owensby staggered as they led him to the car. Officer David Hunter stated that he saw Officer Caton punch Owensby as he lay on the ground handcuffed and swing at him in the cruiser but he was not supported by other officers testimony.

=== Verdict and mistrial ===
Caton was found not guilty. Jorg's case ended in a mistrial with the jury deadlocked 10-2 for acquittal. The prosecutor decided not to retry Jorg. There had been 10 white and two black jurors which incited black activists and reinforced the views of the community, " ... "In the black neighborhoods we knew what was going to happen because nobody else has been convicted," she said, referring to the September acquittal of Officer Stephen Roach in the death of Timothy Thomas."

In 2005 the Hamilton County Prosecutor was asked to reopen the case by a Cincinnati Council Member but he refused saying there was no new evidence.

=== Post trial ===
An article in Cincinnati CityBeat after the trial suggested that material which could have been presented at the trial was not presented. This included two witnesses seen in the video tape from the Suncorp Mini Mart who were not called to testify, discrepancies in testimony by two officers Hasse and Sellers regarding why they were present (Sellers has admitted that he lied under oath).

In 2004 a lawsuit brought by the Owensby family was set to be heard on June 14. The city appealed to the U.S. District Court which granted a summary judgment in favor of the Owensbys allowing the trial to proceed.

Judge Seigel wrote in his decision, "A reasonable jury, hearing all of the evidence, could only determine that (the officers) ... failed to satisfy their respective constitutional obligations to ensure Owensby was provided with the necessary medical care."

On March 17, 2006, the city and Owensby family reached a $6.5 million settlement after a federal judge awarded a summary judgment, finding police had violated Owensby's civil rights by failing to provide medical care.

The US Department of Justice continued to investigate whether any of the officers should face criminal charges under federal civil rights laws, although two local justice investigations reached no consensus on whether officers had acted improperly.

=== Combined complaint alleging racial profiling ===
A group combined individual civil claims against Cincinnati, the police force, and individual police as private citizens, into the Federal lawsuit brought by Tyehimba, filed March 14, 2001, on behalf of the Black men and their surviving family that had died since 1995. They alleged racial profiling but made sure to emphasize a demand for behavioral change by the Cincinnati Police Department beyond or instead of punitive and restitution damages.

A settlement approved by a federal judge was reached on 7 August 2002. It included a five-year effort to bring about reforms within the police department and residents were to be responsible for reducing crime in their neighbourhoods. It also brought to an end the racial-profiling lawsuit filed by the American Civil Liberties Union and the Cincinnati Black United Front, which alleged that police harassed and targeted African-Americans for decades.

=== Status of main officers involved ===
Internal hearings by Cincinnati police began into whether seven officers involved in the Owensby death should be disciplined. The officers were accused of, "... improper use of force, failure of good behavior and neglect of duty."

Caton later won his arbitration case against the decision to have him fired for "failure of good behavior" and was eligible to work for the police force again. He was promoted to lieutenant in early 2016.

Jorg resigned from Cincinnati police force just prior to questioning in a local investigation and started working for another nearby police force in Pierce Township until mid-2003. He later moved from Cincinnati and is currently a Lutheran Church–Missouri Synod pastor in Pennsylvania.

Jorg wrote 13 Minutes, a book describing what happened from his own point of view.

== Documentary ==
In 2014 a documentary Cincinnati Goddamn directed by Paul Hill, April Martin was released. The documentary "is about police brutality, institutional racism, and the power of grassroots activism in Cincinnati, Ohio."

== See also ==
- List of unarmed African Americans killed by law enforcement officers in the United States
