= 2018 Cincinnati shooting =

Mass shooting in Ohio, U.S.

- Location: 39.1019°N 84.511828°W; Fifth Third Center, Cincinnati, Ohio, United States
- Date: September 6, 2018; 9:06 – 9:10 a.m.
- Attack type: Mass shooting, triple-murder
- Weapon: Taurus PT-809E 9mm pistol
- Deaths: 4 (including the perpetrator)
- Injuries: 2
- Perpetrator: Omar Enrique Santa-Perez

On September 6, 2018, a mass shooting occurred in Cincinnati, Ohio, United States. At 9:06 am EDT, Omar Santa-Perez opened fire with a Taurus PT-809E 9mm pistol equipped with standard and hollow-point ammunition, in the lobby of the Fifth Third Center in Cincinnati, Ohio, killing three people. He was then shot and killed by responding police officers.

== Perpetrator ==
Omar Enrique Santa-Perez, 29, was a U.S. citizen born in San Juan, Puerto Rico. Leading up to the incident, Santa-Perez had a history of employment and mental health problems, twice being sent by a judge to be evaluated by mental health professionals. It is unclear whether he attended these evaluations voluntarily. Neighbors described Santa-Perez as "increasingly bitter" in the weeks leading up to the shooting after struggling to hold down a job. Three months prior to the shooting, federal magistrate Karen Litkovitz threw out a lawsuit Santa-Perez had filed against CNBC Universal Media LLC and TD Ameritrade Holding Corp in December 2017 quoting it to be "rambling, difficult to decipher and borders on delusional". In the lawsuit, Santa-Perez alleged that CNBC and TD Ameritrade, through tapping of his personal electronic devices, had uncovered his identity and published it online. There is no evidence of any mention or allusion of him by CNBC prior to the shooting. As part of this lawsuit, Santa-Perez initially demanded more than $5 million in damages, though he later reduced his demand to $3.3 million in federal court. Santa-Perez was also required to disclose his financial holdings as part of the lawsuit, which when asked if he had "any cash on hand or money in savings, checking or other account," he checked "No". He also claimed he had about $700 in stocks and owed about $800 to T-Mobile and University of Cincinnati Health.

== Incident ==
Prior to the attack, Santa-Perez had ordered a drink from a Panera Bread restaurant. He wandered around Fountain Square before entering the Potbelly Sandwich Shop that was attached to the Fifth Third Center. In the sandwich shop, Santa-Perez paced around before sitting down at a table briefly. He left his drink on the table before approaching the door leading to the lobby of the Fifth Third Center. A timeline of the attack was released by the CCA (Citizen Complaint Authority):

Time	Event
9:06:09 a.m.	Omar Santa-Perez shoots two men as he walks down the stairs leading from the Potbelly Sandwich Shop to the Fifth Third Center lobby, killing one and injuring the other. The two men were standing near the stairs leading to the sandwich shop at the lobby before Santa-Perez shot them. They both ran down the stairs leading to the basement after being shot.
9:06:30 a.m.	Santa-Perez moves south towards the revolving door at the lobby of the Fifth Third Center.
9:06:36 a.m.	Santa-Perez shoots a man, who was entering the Fifth Third Center through the revolving door, to death.
9:06:40 a.m.	Santa-Perez moves toward the security desk while taking off his shoulder bag. He places the shoulder bag on the desk and reloads his handgun.
9:07:03 a.m.	Santa-Perez moves back to the revolving door and shoots the downed man several more times.
9:07:10 a.m.	Santa-Perez returns to the security desk and reloads his gun.
9:07:49 a.m.	Santa-Perez observes the elevators on the south and middle sections of the lobby.
9:08:00 a.m.	Santa-Perez fire shots at the middle bank of elevators.
9:08:03 a.m.	Santa-Perez fires a single shot through the lobby window towards Fountain Square.
9:08:05 a.m.	Santa-Perez returns to the security desk and reloads his gun.
9:08:50 a.m.	Santa-Perez moves toward the middle bank of elevators and fire shots.
9:08:54 a.m.	Santa-Perez returns to the security desk and reloads his gun.
9:09:29 a.m.	Santa-Perez moves toward the revolving door and shoots a woman, who was entering the building through the revolving door, several times. She would survive the incident after playing dead.
9:09:34 a.m.	Santa-Perez returns to the security desk and reloads his gun.
9:10:05 a.m.	Santa-Perez moves toward the middle bank of elevators.
9:10:10 a.m.	Santa-Perez returns to the security desk
9:10:25 a.m.	Santa-Perez shoots at two men at the north part of the lobby. The two men had just left an elevator and were walking with their backs toward the lobby. Santa-Perez rush towards them from behind and shoots at them, only hitting one of the men. The man who was shot was killed.
9:10:30 a.m.	Four CPD officers arrive outside the lobby windows, with one of the officers moving towards the lobby door. Santa-Perez aims his handgun at one of the officers while running back towards the security desk.
9:10:33 a.m.	Two officers fire seven rounds at Santa-Perez through the window (1 from rifle and 6 from 9mm handgun).
9:10:37 a.m.	The officer who is at the door fires a shot from his pistol at Santa-Perez. Santa-Perez runs back to the north area of the lobby towards the stairs leading to the sandwich shop.
9:10:39 a.m.	The officer at the door fires a second shot from his pistol while the fourth officer fires once from his shotgun. The shot from the shotgun struck Santa-Perez and caused him to fall.
9:10:41 a.m.	The officer with the shotgun fires a second shot at Santa-Perez.
9:11:28 a.m.	The officers enter the lobby and secured the scene.

Those killed in the attack were identified as bank employees Richard Newcomer, 64, and Prudhvi Kandepi, 25, and contractor Luis Calderon, 48. Two other victims were injured in the attack. Santa-Perez's gun reportedly jammed at least once during his shooting spree. This gave officers enough time to approach the center's main lobby, where they encountered an active shooter situation, with Santa-Perez firing into the lobby. Four of the responding officers engaged the shooter with their weapons, striking Santa-Perez multiple times. Body camera footage of the shooting released by the Cincinnati Police Department showed Santa-Perez indiscriminately shooting at any person he saw, and the gunman was later shot dead through a glass pane by police. The Hamilton County Coroner told reporters "The aggressor had one weapon, but a whole lot of rounds of ammunition. And he didn't hesitate to pull the trigger, empty his magazine, release and do it over and over again." Police have determined Santa-Perez fired between 33-35 rounds during the shooting.

=== Victims ===
One of the victims was reported deceased by first responders at the scene, while two others were declared deceased after arriving at the University of Cincinnati Medical Center. Two other victims were also transported, with one listed in critical condition and the other in fair.

The three fatal victims were shot once, four times, and seven times, respectively, and one of the wounded victims had been shot twelve times.

== Investigation ==
Speaking at a press conference, Cincinnati mayor John Cranley stated that initial reports appeared to show that the victims were shot at random and that, "it didn't appear to be a dispute between people."

During the initial investigation, it was discovered by police that the shooter was carrying hundreds of rounds of ammunition and "...could've killed over 100 people." Body camera footage was released by law enforcement on September 8, which documented the officers' actions when they encountered the gunman.
