= Katherine Kealoha =

Deputy prosecutor of Honolulu

Katherine Puana Kealoha is a former deputy prosecutor with the City and County of Honolulu. She resigned from the position of deputy prosecutor in September 2017 after she and her husband Louis Kealoha were indicted on eight counts of bank fraud. Her husband is a former chief of police.

== Education ==
Kealoha grew up in Kahalu‘u, on the windward side of Oahu. She attended high school at the Mid-Pacific Institute. She obtained a bachelor's degree in political science and a master's degree in criminal justice administration at Chaminade University. Kealoha attended the William S. Richardson School of Law at the University of Hawaii at Manoa and received a Juris Doctor.

== Career ==
Kealoha worked at the Law Offices of Katherine Kealoha and Associates between 2000 and 2006. Kealoha was appointed as the director of the state Office of Environmental Quality Control in 2009 by then-governor of Hawaii, Linda Lingle.

== Legal issues ==
=== Civil case ===
In 2011, Kealoha was accused of stealing hundreds of thousands of dollars from her grandmother, Florence Puana. Kealoha's grandmother and uncle, Gerard Puana filed a civil suit against Kealoha based on the accusations. Kealoha won the civil suit against her grandmother and uncle.

=== Mailbox theft incident ===
On June 22, 2013, Kealoha reported to the Honolulu Police that her mailbox was stolen from her home in Kahala. Kealoha alleged that her uncle Gerard could be seen stealing the mailbox on video taken via her home surveillance system. After having the case transferred from Honolulu Police, the U.S. Postal Inspection Service determined that the man in the video was not Gerard Puana. On July 1, 2013, Gerard Puana was charged by federal prosecutors with destroying a mailbox. Puana's trial began on December 4, 2014. While testifying against Puana, Kealoha's husband, Louis Kealoha caused a mistrial by informing the jury about Puana's former criminal conviction. In December 2013, Niall Silva, a retired policeman from the Honolulu Police Department, pleaded guilty to conspiring with Katherine Kealoha to frame Gerard Puana.

On June 27, 2019, Kealoha was convicted of federal conspiracy and obstruction of justice charges.

In January 2020, Kealoha was scheduled for trial on allegations of bank fraud and identity theft. In October 2019, Kealoha pled guilty to bank fraud, aggravated identity theft and drug charges as part of a plea arrangement.

On November 30, 2020, she was sentenced to 13 years in federal prison. She is currently incarcerated at Federal Correctional Institute, Victorville.
