= Colin McDonald (New Zealand cricketer) =

New Zealand cricketer (1948–2005)

Jim McDonald
Personal information
- Full name: Colin John McDonald
- Born: 8 February 1948; Dunedin, Otago, New Zealand
- Died: 3 October 2005 (aged 57); Invercargill, Southland, New Zealand
- Batting: Right-handed
- Bowling: Right-arm fast-medium
- Role: Bowler

Domestic team information
- Years: Team
- 1968/69: Otago
- Source: ESPNcricinfo, 15 May 2016

Colin John McDonald (8 February 1948 – 3 October 2005) was a New Zealand cricketer and journalist. He played two first-class matches for Otago during the 1968–69 season.

Jim McDonald was born at Dunedin in 1948 and educated at King's High School in the city. He played age-group cricket for Otago from the 1965–66 season and appeared for a New Zealand under-23 side in February 1968 before making his representative debut for Otago in December of the same year. A bowler, he took two wickets on debut against Canterbury and three in Otago's following match against Wellington but did not retain his place in the side.

McDonald worked as journalist. He died at Invercargill in 2005 aged 57. An obituary was published in the following year's New Zealand Cricket Almanack.
