= Louis Kealoha =

Honolulu police chief

- Occupation: Former chief of the Honolulu Police Department
- Known for: Conviction for conspiracy and obstruction of justice

Louis Kealoha is a former chief of the Honolulu Police Department. He joined the department in 1983 and was promoted to Chief on November 25, 2009. Following his appointment, he and his wife Katherine Kealoha threw a lavish party, spending $26,000 that had been stolen from Katherine's grandmother.

In December 2014, the FBI launched an investigation into Louis and Katherine following the arrest and prosecution of her uncle who was framed by the couple for stealing their mailbox. In December 2016, Kealoha was placed on leave after federal charges were filed. In January 2017, the Honolulu Police Commission authorized a payout to Kealoha of $250,000 without the authorization of the Honolulu City Council.

Louis Kealoha was convicted of conspiracy and obstruction of justice, along with his wife Katherine and three other police officers in June 2019. The former police chief began serving a seven-year prison sentence in Oregon which was delayed by the COVID-19 pandemic until June 2021.
