= Honolulu Police Department =

Police Department in Honolulu, Hawaii

- Patch of the Honolulu Police Department

- Badge of the Honolulu Police Department
- Abbreviation: HPD

Agency overview
- Formed: 1846; 180 years ago(First formation)1932; 94 years ago(second formation)
- Employees: 2,700
- Annual budget: $275,482,399.

Jurisdictional structure
- Operations jurisdiction: Honolulu, Hawaii, United States
- Area: 600 square miles (1,600 km^{2})
- Population: 953,207
- Governing body: City and County of Honolulu
- General nature: Local civilian police

Operational structure
- Headquarters: Honolulu, Hawaii
- Sworn members: 2,043
- Unsworn members: 657
- Agency executive: David Lazar, Chief of Police

Website
- www.honolulupd.org www.joinhonolulupd.org

Seal of the City and County of Honolulu

The Honolulu Police Department (HPD) is the principal law enforcement agency of the City and County of Honolulu, Hawaii, headquartered in the Alapa'i Police Headquarters in Honolulu CDP.

Officially recognized as a part of the government of the Kingdom of Hawaii in 1846, the police department serves the entire island of O'ahu (which is coextensive with the City and County of Honolulu), covering over 600 square miles (1,600 km^{2}) of territory, with just over 900,000 residents (not including military members) and over four million annual visitors. The island is divided into 8 patrol districts which are then subdivided into sectors and beats. As of March 2025, HPD has more than 2,500 employees, 1,722 of which are full-time sworn officers with a deficit of 475 sworn officers. A 2003 Department of Justice report listed HPD as the 20th largest police department in the nation.

Unlike the other 49 states, Hawaii does not have a state police agency per se or individual city agencies; law enforcement is the jurisdiction of the individual county governments. HPD is nationally accredited by the Commission on Accreditation for Law Enforcement Agencies and received the CALEA TRI-ARC Excellence Award from them in 2006.

== History ==
=== Predecessors ===
In 1840, the Supreme Court of Kamehameha III established the first constitution for the Kingdom of Hawaii. The constitution paved the way for the Act to Organize the Executive Departments of the Government signed on April 27, 1846. The law created the office of marshal of the kingdom, the highest ranking police officer in the Hawaiian nation. He nominated, instructed, supervised and controlled the sheriffs of the kingdom of which there were four, one for each administrative region of Kaua'i, O'ahu, Mau'i and Hawaii. Each sheriff administered a corps of constables officially appointed by the four royal governors. Constables wore a distinct police insignia that consisted of a scarlet crown with the initials KIII in honor of Kamehameha III. The insignia was worn on the arm and on a red band on their police hats.

In 1893, the Kingdom of Hawaii was overthrown by the Provisional Government of Hawaii which quickly deposed the marshal of the kingdom and dissolved the constabulary. In 1894, the newly proclaimed Republic of Hawaii formed its own police system.

After a few years under the governance of the Territory of Hawaii, four county governments were established out of the original administrative regions of the monarchy. John Thomas Kelly (1868–1927) was the first Sheriff of Honolulu under this system, and had served as an engineer in the 2nd Regiment during the Spanish-American War. His diary is on display in the Hawaiian National Archives. In 1905, each county established a police department led by an appointed sheriff. Police officers wore an octagon-shaped police badge similar in appearance to those of other police departments of the period. In the 1920s the badge was redesigned with an eagle on top.

In Hawaii, the Office of Sheriff falls under the Sheriff Division of the Hawaii Department of Law Enforcement (DLE). It is the functional equivalent of a state police department and has the distinction of making Hawaii the only U.S. state without an officially named state police department and one of two with a statewide Sheriff's Department (the other being Rhode Island). Although the Sheriff Division's jurisdiction covers the entire state, its primary functions are judicial and executive protection, security at the Hawaii State Capitol, law-enforcement at Hawaii's airports, narcotics enforcement, prisoner transportation, the processing and service of court orders and warrants, and patrol of certain roads and waterways in conjunction with other state agencies.

Additional statewide law enforcement is provided by the Department of Land and Natural Resources (DLNR) which patrols State lands, State Parks, historic sites, forest reserves, aquatic life and wildlife areas, coastal zones, Conservation districts, State beaches, as well as county ordinances involving county parks. The division also enforces laws relating to firearms, ammunition, and dangerous weapons. DLNR officers have full police powers.

=== Establishment ===
In response to a crime wave in the late 1920s and early 1930s as a combined result of increased racial tensions between whites and local ethnics and the outcome of the Massie case involving too much political influence on the Police, Territorial Governor Lawrence M. Judd appointed a Governor's Advisory Committee on Crime. The committee recommended that a police commission be appointed by the mayor of Honolulu whose duty would be to appoint a chief of police and to supervise the operating of the police department. The committee also advised that the office of sheriff should be retained and charged with the duty of serving civil process, of maintaining the Honolulu prison system and to act as coroner. On January 22, 1932, a special session of the territorial legislature passed Act 1, establishing the Honolulu Police Commission and creating the office of chief of police. Thus was born the modern Honolulu Police Department as it exists today.

=== Martial law ===
After the attack on Pearl Harbor on December 7, 1941, Territorial Governor Joseph B. Poindexter declared martial law and Hawaii fell under military governance under the Judge Advocate General's Corps. The Honolulu Police Department became a deputized military force. The word "Emergency" was etched above the "Honolulu" on the seven-point star badges of police officers. For the duration of World War II, the Honolulu Police Department was forced to impose restrictions on civil liberties and hand people over for trial by a military judge. Martial law ended after the end of the war in 1945.

The San José State Spartans football team served with the Honolulu Police Department for the duration of World War II; the team had played a game against the University of Hawaiʻi at Mānoa Warriors, but were stranded in Hawaii after the Pearl Harbor attack.

=== Modernization ===
The first instance of modernization came in 1952 with the introduction of the Honolulu Police Department's current badge. It was designed by Detective Alfred Karratti and embodies Hawaiian tradition and culture in its motifs. One feature that Detective Karratti kept was the use of the Pūloʻuloʻu or kapu staffs. They are symbols of law and order from ancient Hawaii.

In 1976 Sister Roberta Julie Derby became the first female police chaplain in the U.S. and would later go on to win the medal of valor for defusing a hostage situation.

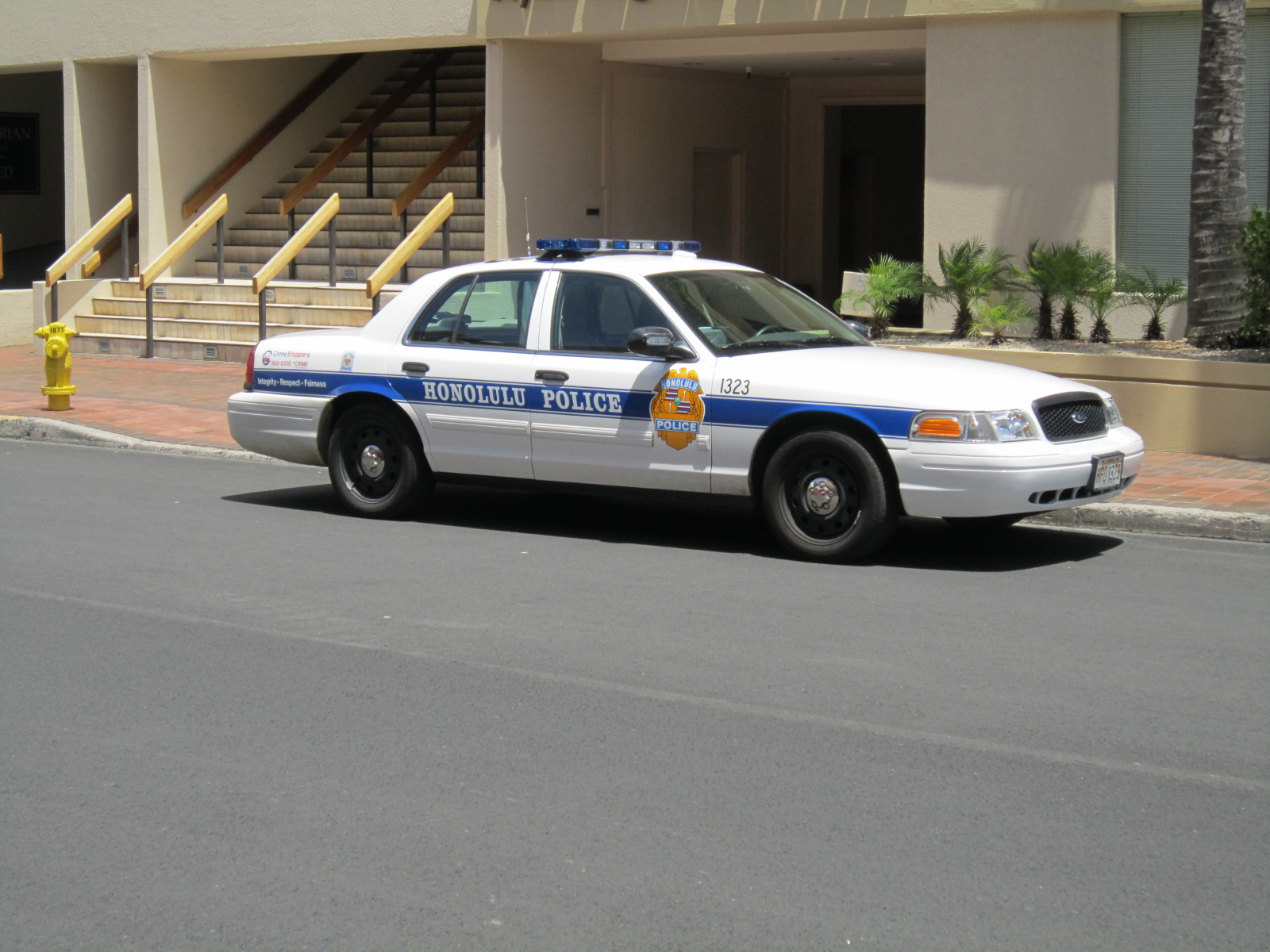
A Honolulu Police Department Crown Victoria

The most aggressive programs of modernization for the Honolulu Police Department came in the 1990s. It was furnished with a fleet of new Ford Crown Victoria police cars equipped with on-board computers and a fleet of BMW police motorcycles. Officers also have the choice of using their own private vehicle for law enforcement duties as part of a subsidized program. The vehicle has sirens installed and removable blue police light which is put on the roof of the officers' car. On October 16, 1992, the Honolulu Police Department opened its multimillion-dollar state-of-the-art police headquarters in downtown Honolulu. The building was called Hale Maka'i and featured the latest technical advances of its time including a DNA crime lab unit, one of the first of its kind in the nation.

=== Corruption and misconduct ===
In October 2015, a former HPD officer was sentenced to 30 months in federal prison for an "unprovoked attack" on two men in a game room.

In 2016, a retired police officer pleaded guilty to lying under oath as part of a conspiracy to frame a man for stealing a mailbox from the home of Police Chief Louis Kealoha.

In 2017, Chief Louis Kealoha retired from the police department amid an FBI investigation into corruption and conspiracy. In June 2019, a jury in federal court convicted Kealoha (along with his wife Katherine and two Honolulu police officers) of using their law enforcement positions in an attempt "to frame Katherine Kealoha's uncle for stealing the couple's mailbox in 2013" and subsequently lying to federal investigators. The Kealohas pleaded guilty in October 2019 to financial crimes arising from the mailbox theft (specifically bank fraud and identity theft); two others were convicted in connection to the same case. In November 2020, Louis Kealoha was sentenced to serve 8 years in federal prison. Due to precautions related to the concurrent COVID-19 pandemic, Louis Kealoha was allowed to start his sentence in April 2021. His wife, Katherine, received a sentence of 13 years.

In 2018, Lieutenant Eric Yiu, a veteran detective who investigated financial crimes, was indicted on six felony counts of making false statements on his state tax returns. He pleaded guilty in March 2019, as part of a plea agreement, to filing fraudulent tax returns for three years, and May 2019, he was ordered to pay $11,654 for tax evasion, but avoided jail.

== Patrol vehicles ==
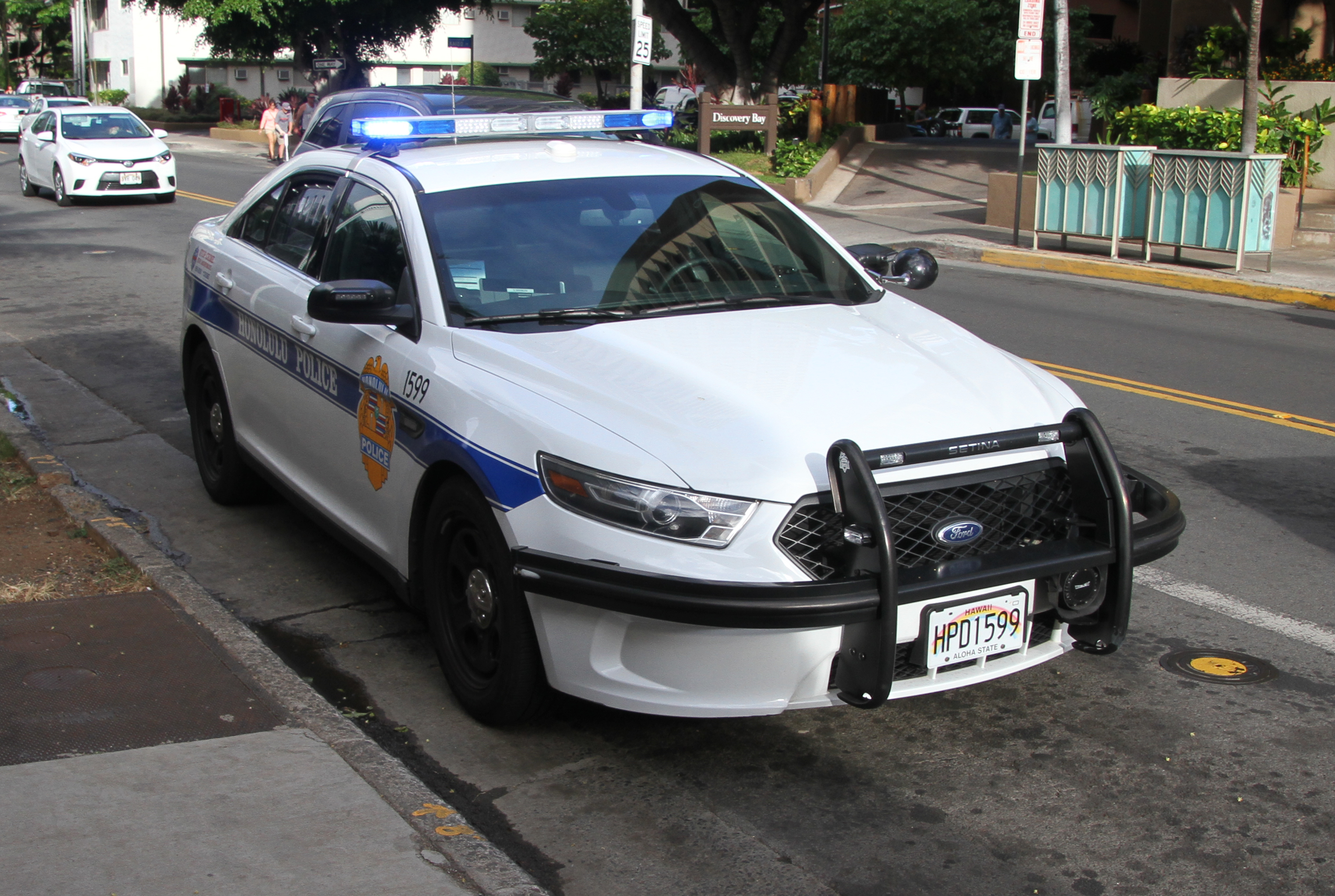
A marked Honolulu Police Department squad car

The Honolulu Police Department has several new vehicles, such as the Ford Taurus Police Interceptor, Ford Explorer Police Interceptor, non-traditional police vehicle such as the Ford Fusion and Toyota Camry, and a few Ford Crown Victoria's are still in use, despite no longer being produced. HPD marked vehicles are white and blue.

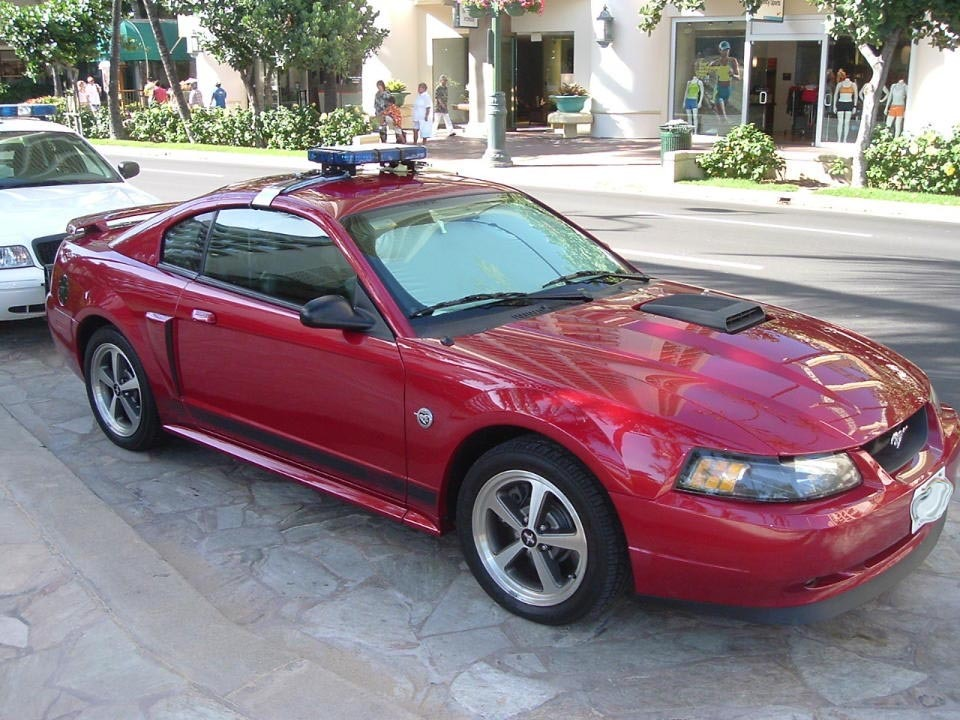
An unmarked Honolulu Police car

The Honolulu Police Department is one of the four police departments in the state of Hawaii, being Hawaii County Police on "the big island," Kauai Police Department, and Maui Police Department. Officers are permitted to purchase a vehicle for police patrol and for personal usage of any make and model, however it must be approved by the chief and must meet certain police department guidelines. These "subsidized" vehicles are unmarked and the officers receive payment for taking care of the vehicle including fuel payment. Although they are unmarked they can be easily identified by a small blue LED light on the roof of the vehicles. They are also equipped with sirens to be used for on duty only. Hawaii is one of a handful of US states in which police officers are permitted to use personal vehicles for official police businesses.

== Rank structure and insignia ==
The Honolulu Police Department follows a paramilitary-like ranking structure. The ranks are identified as follows:

Rank	Insignia	Badge Color
Chief of Police		Gold. Rank inscribed on badge. Badge number is #1
Deputy Chief		Gold. Rank inscribed on badge
Assistant Chief		Gold. Rank inscribed on badge
Major	3 kukui nuts on each shoulder	Gold. Rank inscribed on badge
Captain	2 kukui nuts on each shoulder	Gold. Rank inscribed on badge
Lieutenant	1 kukui nut on each shoulder	Gold. Rank inscribed on badge
Sergeant/Detective		Gold. Rank inscribed on badge
Corporal		Silver. Rank inscribed on badge
Officer	No Insignia	Silver. Rank inscribed on badge

Officers may have stars located on the right-side chest area of their uniform above their name tag. These do not indicate rank: each star represents five years of service with the Honolulu Police Department. All uniformed emergency response personnel in the State of Hawaii generally follow this practice, although it does not carry on from one agency to the next.

== Districts ==
The Honolulu Police Department has 5 stations, 5 substations and Police Headquarters located in central Honolulu Alapai Police HQ.

- District 1 covers central and downtown Honolulu along with Chinatown, Nuuanu, Makiki, Ala Moana, Kakaako
- District 2 covers Wahiawa - Mililani, Schofield Barracks/Wheeler, Waialua and Waimea
- District 3 covers Pearl City - Aloha Stadium, Pearl Harbor, Aiea, Pearl City, Royal Kunia, Waipi'o, Waikele and Waipahu
- District 4 covers Kaneohe/Kailua/Kahuku, Waimanalo, Kaneohe MCBH, Waiahole/Waikane, Kahaluu, Hauula.
- District 5 covers Kalihi - Iwilei, Kapalama, Alewa, Nuuanu, Fort Shafter, Moanalua, Salt Lake, Daniel K. Inouye International Airport and Hickam
- District 6 covers Waikiki (includes Kapiolani Park).
- District 7 covers East Honolulu, Moiliili, University of Hawaii at Manoa, Kaimuki, Kahala, Hawaii Kai
- District 8 covers Kapolei, Ewa Beach, Waianae, East Kapolei, Kalaeloa, Makakilo, Nanakuli, Makaha, Ko Olina.

== Honolulu Police Specialized Services Division ==
The Honolulu Police Specialized Services Division is a special tactical and task force. HPD SSD members have several roles such as responding to high risk calls as SWAT, hostage rescues, dealing with fugitive or dangerous criminals, and barricaded subjects. They are also tasked with protection of head of states and work alongside other law enforcement local, state and federal to apprehend any criminals surrounding the island of Oahu.

The Bomb Squad is tasked with responding to any calls related to IED and properly disposing, defuse the device. They are trained in detecting and proper handling of explosive materials from fireworks, commercial and IEDs including military grade explosives. They train with federal agencies and the US Military.

The Canine Unit receives training along with dogs are called upon to search for missing people, dangerous criminals and prisoner escapees. Each dog is designated a badge and is an official police officer.

The Helicopter Section- Officers in this section are trained as police officers and FAA pilot mechanic certified. They are tasked in assisting HPD ground units by providing aerial observation for missing people, wanted fugitives, criminals and any other police related matter.

== Reserves ==
Since 1941, the police department has maintained a police reserve program. Reserve officers are unpaid volunteers who work part-time (at least five hours per week) for the department in various roles.

== Line of duty deaths ==
As of August 2022, 49 Honolulu Police Department officers have been killed in the line of duty. The department webpage lists all of them on a "Roll of Honor".

Cause	Incidents
Car accident	6
Electrocution	1
Gunfire	18
Heart attack	1
Helicopter accident	4
Motorcycle accident	13
Stabbing	1
Struck by vehicle	5

== Duty weapons ==
The standard issue firearm for Honolulu Police officers is the Glock 17. Prior to 2014, officers were issued the Smith & Wesson Model 5906 but have since been phased out due to the age of the pistol and limited availability of parts. Officers carry their issued sidearm, the Glock 17 and can check out AR-15 rifles and less lethal shotguns from the armory while on their tour of duty. Officers assigned to the SSD use the Glock Model 21 Gen 4 .45 ACP handgun, with the exception of SSD personnel assigned to parks. Officers can purchase supplemental weapons from an approved list and utilize them (as backup weapons or off-duty carry), AR-15 rifles, and shotguns. Officers must qualify with these supplemental weapons to carry or use them.

Approved long guns are the Colt AR-15 rifle, Remington 870 or Benelli M1 (Super 90) shotgun. Although most Officers carry their own personal long guns while on duty, respective stations throughout the island have a small arsenal of AR-15 rifles and less than lethal shotguns in the event they are needed.

== In popular culture ==
The Honolulu Police Department has been the backdrop of several famous works of fiction, in literature, television and in motion pictures.

=== Charlie Chan ===
One of the most famous fictional literary detectives attached to the Honolulu Police Department was Charlie Chan. Chan, inspired in part by the career of HPD vice detective Chang Apana, was created in the 1920s by Earl Derr Biggers and became one of the most important figures in American mystery fiction. In addition to being the hero of six novels, Chan was the subject of some forty films between the 1930s and 1950s. He, along with his family, was also made the subject of a short-lived ABC/Hanna-Barbera cartoon series in the mid-1970s, The Amazing Chan and the Chan Clan. His career spanned from 1898 to 1932.

=== Hawaiian Eye ===
From October 1959 to September 1963, Hawaiian Eye was a crime drama aired on the ABC television network. Actors Robert Conrad and Anthony Eisley played private detectives fighting crime in Honolulu. Connie Stevens played Cricket, a singer at the Hawaiian Village Hotel bar which the guys frequented at least once a show. Mel Prestidge played Lt. Danny Quon, a Honolulu Police Lieutenant.

=== Hawaii Five-O ===
The most famous Hawaii based crime drama was Hawaii Five-O which aired on the CBS television network from September 1968 to April 1980. Until Law & Order, Hawaii Five-O was the longest running crime series on American television. Jack Lord starred as Steve McGarrett, head of the elite state law enforcement office which worked alongside the chief of the Honolulu Police Department. James MacArthur starred as Danny Williams, McGarrett's right-hand man. McGarrett and "Danno" were straight-laced men with extreme dedication to law and justice fighting the forces of evil around the islands, especially in seedy downtown dives. Kam Fong Chun (who played Det. Chin Ho Kelly) was, in real life, a former HPD officer during World War Two. In several episodes of the show's first season, McGarrett mentions "Chief Dan" helping the Five-O unit with things like extra manpower or investigative resources; this referred to the real life Honolulu Police Chief Dan Liu (1908–1986), HPD's longest serving chief (1948–1969). (Chief Dan Liu also appeared as himself in the 1952 film Big Jim McLain.)

A modern-day remake of the series aired on the same television network from September 2010 to April 2020. Like its predecessor, the remake prominently featured the HPD, usually uniform officers assisting the Five-0 task force in apprehending suspects, collecting evidence and securing crime scenes. The main characters, as of season 6, were all either former HPD officers or have some connection to the HPD: Steve McGarrett's father John was a former HPD sergeant, Chin Ho Kelly was John McGarrett's protege and reached the rank of Lieutenant, Danny Williams transferred to HPD from Newark PD in New Jersey, Kono Kalakaua was a fresh graduate from the HPD Academy and Lou Grover was the commander of the HPD SWAT Team. Kam Fong Chun's son Dennis Chun had a recurring role as HPD Sgt. Duke Lukela.

=== Magnum, P.I. ===
From December 1980 to September 1988, Magnum, P.I. aired on the same network as Hawaii Five-O (in fact, some of the shooting was done on the same sound stage). Starring Tom Selleck as former U.S. Naval Intelligence and SEAL officer (and Detroit native) Thomas Magnum, Magnum, P.I. is about a private investigator working closely with Honolulu Police Department officers Nolan Page and Yoshi Tanaka - and verbally referenced McGarrett and 'Five-O' on occasion - while trying to enjoy the "easy life" at the estate of a very reclusive mystery writer named "Robin Masters" and his "butler" Jonathan Higgins (played by Texas-born veteran actor John Hillerman). The series was widely applauded for being the first to recognize the difficulty Vietnam War veterans faced in making the readjustment to civilian life. Many episodes touched upon the impact that serving in Vietnam had on Magnum and his friends, as well as echoes to events of World War II.

A reboot of Magnum P.I was released between 2018 and 2024. Similar to Five-0, the show prominently featured HPD assisting Magnum and his partner Juliet Higgins in apprehending suspects, raids, or providing information from the department. The show featured a rebooted Detective Yoshi Tanaka for its first 3 episodes before being promoted with Detective Gordon Katsumoto being the main "liaison" between the PIs and HPD for the majority of the show. Other detectives appeared as well, including Detective Childs and Detective Thomas, who was Magnum's girlfriend in Season 4. Along with this, certain HPD officers who were in Hawaii Five-0 made their way onto Magnum PI as well.

=== Hawaiian Heat ===
Hawaiian Heat was a short-lived series (September–December 1984) that was heavily hyped by ABC during its 1984 Olympics coverage. It starred Robert Ginty and Jeff McCracken as two Chicago cops who bag their boring jobs in the frozen Windy City to become detectives in paradise; their boss was played by veteran actor Mako Iwamatsu. Many of the episodes were directed by reclusive African-American actor/director Ivan Dixon.

=== Jake and the Fatman ===
From September 1987 to March 1992, CBS Television (in conjunction with Dean Hargrove Productions and the former Viacom Television) aired a spin-off for a Matlock character. The show was called Jake and the Fatman about Los Angeles County District Attorney Jason Lochinvar McCade (played by veteran radio/TV actor William Conrad) and his Chief Investigator, Jake Styles (played by Joe Penny). In the second season, CBS executives decided to film in Hawaii instead (having McCabe quit as DA for Los Angeles to become the Prosecuting Attorney in Honolulu), so the entire cast (including the show's mascot, a bulldog named Max) was sent to Honolulu. After two seasons in Hawaii, the series returned to L.A.

=== Hawaii ===
In August 2004, NBC introduced the police series Hawaii. The show featured an elite Honolulu Police Department detective squad charged with fighting the most notorious of Hawaiʻi mob criminals. Starring in the show were Michael Biehn from The Terminator as Sean Harrison, Sharif Atkins from ER as John Declan, Ivan Sergei from Crossing Jordan as Danny Edwards, Eric Balfour from Six Feet Under as Christopher Gains, and newcomers Aya Sumika as Linh Tamiya and Cary-Hiroyuki Tagawa as Captain Terry Harada. Jeff Eastin was the creator and executive producer. Daniel Sackheim from the defunct series The Lyon's Den directed. The series was canceled after eight episodes, partly due to strong competition from another show produced in Hawaii, ABC's Lost.

NCIS Hawai'i

In 2021, a year after the reboot of Hawaii Five-0's cancellation, CBS announced the release of NCIS Hawai'i, a spin-off of the military-police drama NCIS. Although the show focused on naval crimes, HPD officers can be prominently seen securing evidence in crime scenes, along with assisting with raids every so often. Similar to the reboot of Magnum P.I., certain HPD officers who appeared in Hawaii Five-0 appeared in NCIS Hawai'i as well. The most prominent character in NCIS Hawai'i from HPD was Detective Dalia Reed, who served on the Narcotics Task Force.

== See also ==
- Hawaii Department of Public Safety

== See also ==
- State of Hawaii Organization of Police Officers
- Honolulu Police Commission
