= Colin MacGilp MacDonald =

British historian and author (1882–1964)

- Born: Colin MacGilp MacDonald; 1882; Glasgow, Scotland
- Died: 1964 (aged 81–82); Dunoon, Scotland
- Occupations: Historian, author, professor
- Known for: The History of Argyll Up to the Beginning of the Sixteenth Century, The County of Argyll,

Academic background
- Education: University of St Andrews

Academic work
- Discipline: International history, Scottish history, Greek, Latin, classics, philosophy

Colin MacGilp MacDonald was a British historian and author. Trained in Classics at the University of St Andrews, he is a historian of early and medieval Britain. He specialized in the history of Scotland and published several extensive monographs about the history, culture, and language of the Scottish Highlands and Islands.

MacDonald published several major historical works and is best known for his comprehensive The History of Argyll Up to the Beginning of the Sixteenth Century which was first published in 1950 to great acclaim in London and Glasgow by W. & R. Holmes Publishers. His books and monographs represent important imprints of Scottish history and include original research and first-hand accounts of Scottish and British culture.

== Early life and education ==
Colin MacGilp MacDonald was born in Glasgow in 1882. After graduating from school, MacDonald went up to study Classics at the University of St Andrews. On 11 July 1914 he was awarded a D.Litt. from the University of St Andrews in addition to his M.A. degree. As a scholar of the day, MacDonald was classically trained to read and speak Latin. Over the course of his education and upbringing he also developed the ability to speak and write in Gaelic. He would later go on to publish several works in Gaelic and English.

== Teaching ==
Later in life he took up teaching Latin and history to students in Scotland and the United Kingdom. Before the end of his life, MacDonald dedicated himself to teaching Latin, history, and philosophy to many students in schools around Dunoon and Glasgow in Scotland.

== Major works ==
MacDonald published books and historical monographs on the history of early and medieval Britain, and in particular Scotland and the Gaelic speaking peoples. MacDonald's writing was authoritative and provided thoroughly-researched histories of Britain and Scotland. Many of his books remain in print today and are still used in universities around the world.

- The History of Argyll Up to the Beginning of the Sixteenth Century (1950: W. & R. Holmes; London/Glasgow)
- The County of Argyll and Western Isles (1961: Mearns Publishers; Aberdeen)

== Legacy ==
The works of MacDonald represent an important turning point in Scottish history and provide some of the most comprehensive research on the life, culture, and languages of the Highlands and Islands of Scotland. His work is buttressed by thorough use of original sources and first-hand accounts from elder highlanders who were unable to write in English. MacDonald's work combines these accounts with the history of the region and presents a fascinating, if controversial, understanding of Scottish and British history. MacDonald's writing was concise and provided thoroughly-researched histories of Britain and Scotland. Many of his books remain in print today and are still used in universities around the world.

Towards the end of his life, MacDonald dedicated himself to teaching Latin, history, and philosophy to the next generation of students in Dunoon and Glasgow in Scotland.
