= Cincinnati riots of 2001 =

Urban riot in response to Ohio police shooting

2001 Cincinnati riots
- Date: April 9–13, 2001 (5 days); 25 years ago
- Location: Cincinnati, Ohio, U.S.
- Caused by: Shooting of Timothy Thomas
- Methods: Protests and acts of civil unrest, vandalism and looting in Over-the-Rhine, downtown, Walnut Hills, Bond Hill, and Avondale.
- Result: An estimated $3.6 million in damage; an estimated loss of $10 million due to the subsequent boycott; reform of police procedures concerning racial profiling

Parties
Cincinnati P.D.; Ohio Highway Patrol; Hamilton County Sheriff's Office	Participants

Casualties
- Injuries: Dozens
- Arrested: 158 in civil disobedience, 800 for curfew violations.
- Damage: $15.6 million

The 2001 Cincinnati riots were a series of civil disorders which took place in and around the Over-the-Rhine neighborhood of downtown Cincinnati, Ohio from April 9 to 13, 2001. They began with a peaceful protest in the heart of the city on Fountain Square over the inadequate police response to the police shooting of unarmed African American 19-year-old Timothy Thomas. The peaceful protest soon turned into a riot that went in the direction of the victim's home neighborhood of Over-the-Rhine.

The period of unrest was sparked after 19-year-old Timothy Thomas, an unarmed African American man, was shot and killed by Cincinnati Police Department Patrolman Stephen Roach during an attempt to arrest him for non-violent misdemeanors, most of which were traffic citations. Tensions were already high in the city following a series of other incidents involving apparent police brutality and alleged racial profiling. Protests erupted into four nights of unrest, with instances of recorded property destruction in Cincinnati, objects thrown at police officers by demonstrators, and vandalism and looting of businesses before a city-imposed curfew eventually ended the unrest.

It was ultimately determined that the period of unrest caused $3.6 million in damage to businesses and another $1.5 to $2 million to the city. A subsequent community boycott of downtown businesses had an estimated adverse impact of $10 million on the area. Incidents of violent crime rose in the downtown area for several years thereafter. The city worked with the community and police to improve training and policies to prevent incidents like that in which Thomas was killed.

== Background ==
The initial incident and much of the subsequent unrest began on Fountain Square in Downtown Cincinnati. Much of the subsequent unrest took place in Over-the-Rhine, the neighborhood of the victim immediately north of Cincinnati's central business district. A 2000 demographic profile of the neighborhood showed a resident population of 7,368, of whom 5,974 were African American. The profile also showed significant poverty, unemployment, and a lack of development in the area for several decades. Some 1,667 of 3,594 housing units, or more than one third, in the neighborhood were vacant. About 96 percent of the occupied houses were renter-occupied. The neighborhood had a concentration of African Americans, who otherwise made up 40 percent overall of the 331,000 residents of the city. At the time of the protests and growing unrest, the median income in Over-the-Rhine was $8,600 compared to $26,774 for the city overall. Author David Waddington attributed the poverty of the area to high unemployment resulting from a loss of manufacturing jobs in the city, as well as cuts in youth programs in the city. The neighborhood had a high rate of crimes, in particular drug-related offenses.

The array of poverty-associated problems resulted in heightened tensions between African-American residents in the neighborhood and the Cincinnati Police Department. Between 1995 and April 2001, fifteen black males suspected of crimes had been killed by Cincinnati police during confrontation or while in custody, including four since November 2000, while no white suspects were killed in that period.

In particular, two recent deaths had sparked tensions: Roger Owensby, Jr. died November 7, 2000, allegedly of asphyxiation from a chokehold from a police officer, and Jeffrey Irons died the next day in a scuffle with police. One of the officers was acquitted, while the other case ended in a mistrial and the officer was not re-tried.

This string of deaths led to claims by the community that the police were acting discriminatorily. Three weeks before the protests and growing unrest, the American Civil Liberties Union (ACLU) and a group of local organizations filed a civil lawsuit against the police department and city, alleging 30 years of racial profiling. A number of other civil suits were initiated against the department, including one African-American man who alleged he was handcuffed and beaten during a traffic stop. Bomani Tyehimba filed a lawsuit in 1999 against the city of Cincinnati. He claimed that during a routine traffic stop, police illegally ordered him out of his car, handcuffed him and held a gun to his head.

A local independent newspaper, CityBeat, published research that an "analysis of 141,000 traffic citations written by Cincinnati Police in a 22-month period found black drivers twice as likely as whites to be cited for driving without a license, twice as likely to be cited for not wearing a seat belt and four times as likely to be cited for driving without proof of insurance." The NAACP argued that such statistics were the result of police targeting "driving while black," rather than actual differences in the rate of offenses committed by different groups.

== Incident ==
Killing of Timothy Thomas
- Location: 39°06′33.08″N 84°30′55.68″W; Cincinnati, Ohio
- Date: April 7, 2001; 25 years ago
- Target: Timothy Thomas
- Attack type: Police Brutality, Murder
- Victim: Timothy Thomas
- Perpetrator: Stephen Roach
- Charges: Negligent homicide
- Verdict: Not guilty

In the early morning hours of April 7, 2001, Cincinnati police in Over-the-Rhine attempted to arrest the 19-year-old, who was wanted on 14 nonviolent misdemeanor counts, of which 12 were traffic citations. Thomas was pursued for 10 minutes by nine officers, who were later joined by Patrolman Stephen Roach. The pursuit culminated at 2:20 a.m. when Thomas rounded a corner in a dark alley and surprised Roach, who shot him in the chest at close range. Roach said he believed Thomas was reaching for a gun in his waistband, but investigation later determined Thomas was trying to pull up his saggy pants. Roach also said that he was not aware that charges against Thomas were non-violent, and that Thomas ignored an order to stop. Thomas was rushed to a hospital, but died of his wounds.

In little more than two months preceding this incident, Timothy Thomas had received numerous traffic citations: he "was pulled over 11 times by six different white officers and four black officers. They cited Thomas for 21 violations, almost all of them for exactly the same things – not wearing a seat belt or driving without a license."

== Disturbance ==
The shooting of Thomas sparked widespread outrage in the city, especially in Over-the-Rhine. On April 9, a group of 200 protesters brandishing signs, including Thomas' mother, Angela Leisure, gathered outside Cincinnati City Hall while the city council was in session, to demand public explanation for Thomas' shooting. The protesters also demanded to know the results of the police investigation of the shooting, but were told the department was not ready and was still investigating. The council members stayed inside city hall for three hours and did not respond to the crowd's demands.

Later that evening, several hundred residents gathered outside the Cincinnati Police District 1 headquarters in Over-the-Rhine and confronted a line of police officers on horseback and in police cruisers. For about an hour, the crowd threw stones and bottles at police, smashed the station's front door, pulled the station flag from its mast and re-hung it upside down. Police dispersed the crowd with tear gas, bean bags and rubber bullets. Ten arrests were made during the incident.

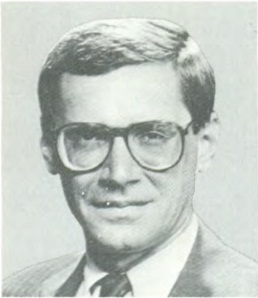
Cincinnati Mayor Charlie Luken issued a citywide curfew that largely ended the period of unrest.

On the afternoon of April 10, the unrest resumed after a static protest on Fountain Square. Approximately 20 to 30 African-Americans moved through city streets towards Over the Rhine, soon followed by police officers. At two road intersections, the crowd began throwing bottles and garbage at police, who retreated both times. Parts of the crowd headed back downtown, where they began to overturn garbage cans, vendor carts, and newspaper boxes. The crowd began smashing windows of businesses and looting stores. Police moved in on horseback or with linked arms and dispersed the crowd with bean bags, tear gas and rubber bullets. They made sixty-six arrests of protesters over the course of the day. The city called in deputies from the Hamilton County Sheriff's Office to help when looting and vandalism broke out in other poorer neighborhoods in Cincinnati, including Walnut Hills and Avondale, where vandals broke windows and set small fires. Several gunshots were fired during the night, and there were a number of injuries reported in the incidents. Participants in the period of unrest dispersed in the early morning hours.

Many of the damaged downtown businesses resumed normal operations the next day. But, at nightfall on April 11, another interval of unrest broke out downtown as nothing had yet been done in retribution for the killing of Timothy Thomas, and more businesses were damaged and looted. Sporadic incidents continued the next evening, and a police crackdown resulted in another 82 arrests. By April 12, many downtown businesses did not open, and workers for many others refused to go downtown. A third night of unrest continued that evening, causing further damage.

The morning of April 13, Cincinnati Mayor Charlie Luken announced a citywide curfew from 8 p.m. to 6 a.m. for all but work travelers. He also declared a state of emergency and brought in 125 Ohio Highway Patrol troopers to assist with policing. In all, 800 people were arrested for violating curfew conditions. This curfew did not extend to the city's suburbs, prompting some criticism from Cincinnati residents of uneven enforcement of the curfew.

April 14 was the day of Timothy Thomas' funeral. Police kept a helicopter airborne and stationed police two blocks from the service. About 2,000 protesters began a peaceful march downtown following the service. A procession of 30 from the funeral marched to the intersection of Elm and Liberty streets. A group of seven law enforcement personnel arrived in patrol cruisers and fired bean bag ammunition into a crowd of 20, injuring four, including two children. Police contended they were acting under orders to disperse a large crowd blocking the intersection, while witnesses claimed the police did not provide warning and singled out black members of the group.

== Aftermath ==
The total damage sustained from the period of protest and unrest amounted to $3.6 million. In all, the city said 120 businesses experienced damage due to the civil unrest. It cost the city another $1.5 million to $2 million for emergency responders and equipment damage. The four days of protest and unrest are considered the largest urban disturbance in the United States since the 1992 Los Angeles period of unrest. There has been extensive discussion within the local community about the effects of suburbanization and urban decay in the city, as well as the redevelopment of Over-the-Rhine, a historic neighborhood. The incidents again strained the relationship between the police and residents of the city's minority communities. In 2002, the city signed an agreement for initiatives to improve police service to minority communities, revise use-of-force guidelines and form a committee for community policing initiatives.

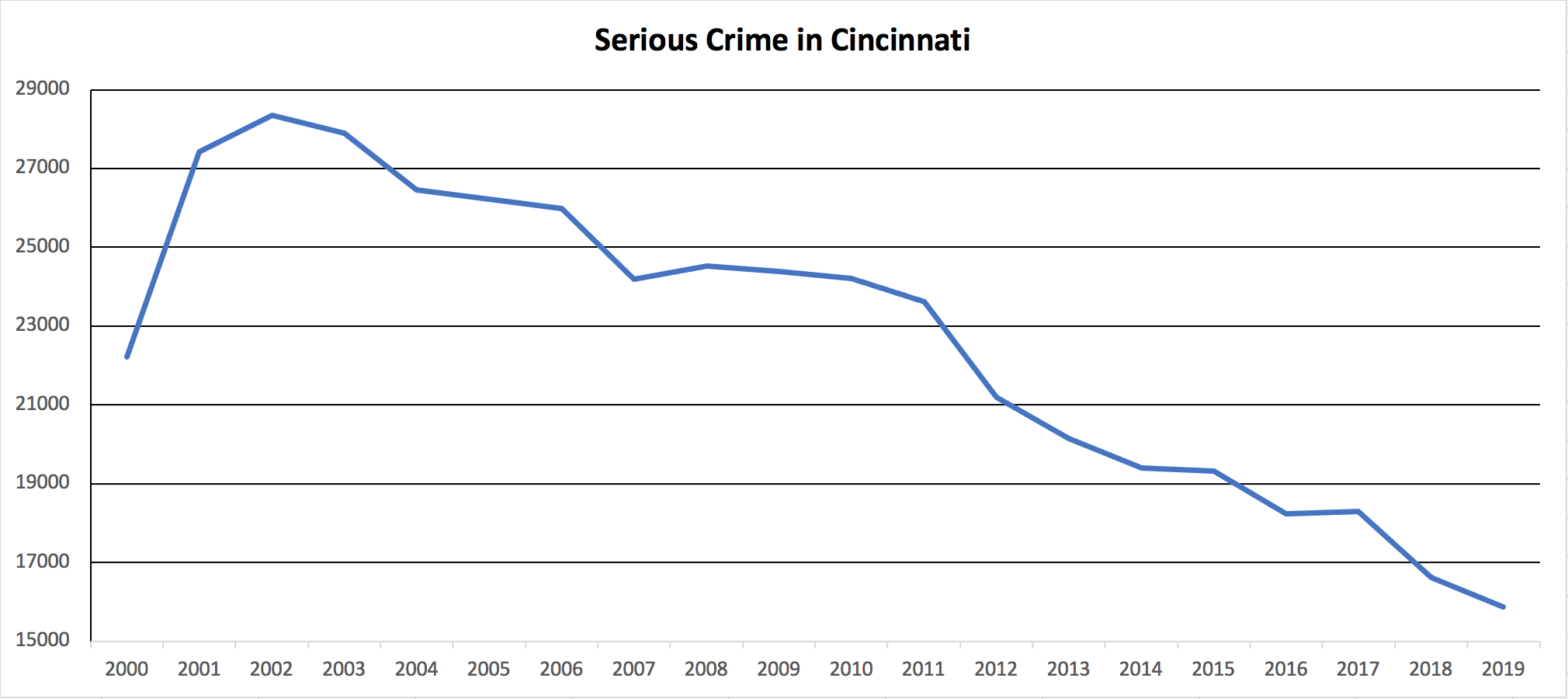
Graph showing the decline of crime in the city since the riots

CPD officers began an unofficial work slowdown, which coincided with a rise in violent crime in the downtown area. In 2001 and 2002, violent crime and property crime rates rose in the city, with property crime rates peaking in 2003 before declining through 2010. The city has a crime rate higher than the national average but similar to other major cities. Initiatives were subsequently begun by community groups to reduce violence.

Sixty-three participants of the protest involved with property destruction and/or violence were indicted on felony charges.

Roach was tried for negligent homicide in September 2001. Cincinnati police attempted to waive the trial in favor of a bench ruling. Roach, who left the force to join a suburban police department, was later acquitted of the charges. Several isolated incidents of civil unrest occurred after his verdict was announced. An internal police investigation found Roach had lied in his incident report, had not followed department firearm procedures, and had not given Thomas sufficient time to respond to his order.

Angered by police reaction, particularly the April 14 incident, several community groups organized a boycott of downtown businesses. Several prominent African-American entertainers scheduled to perform in the city, including Bill Cosby, Whoopi Goldberg, and Smokey Robinson cancelled their performances there. After a year, the community boycott was estimated to have caused a $10 million negative economic impact on the city.

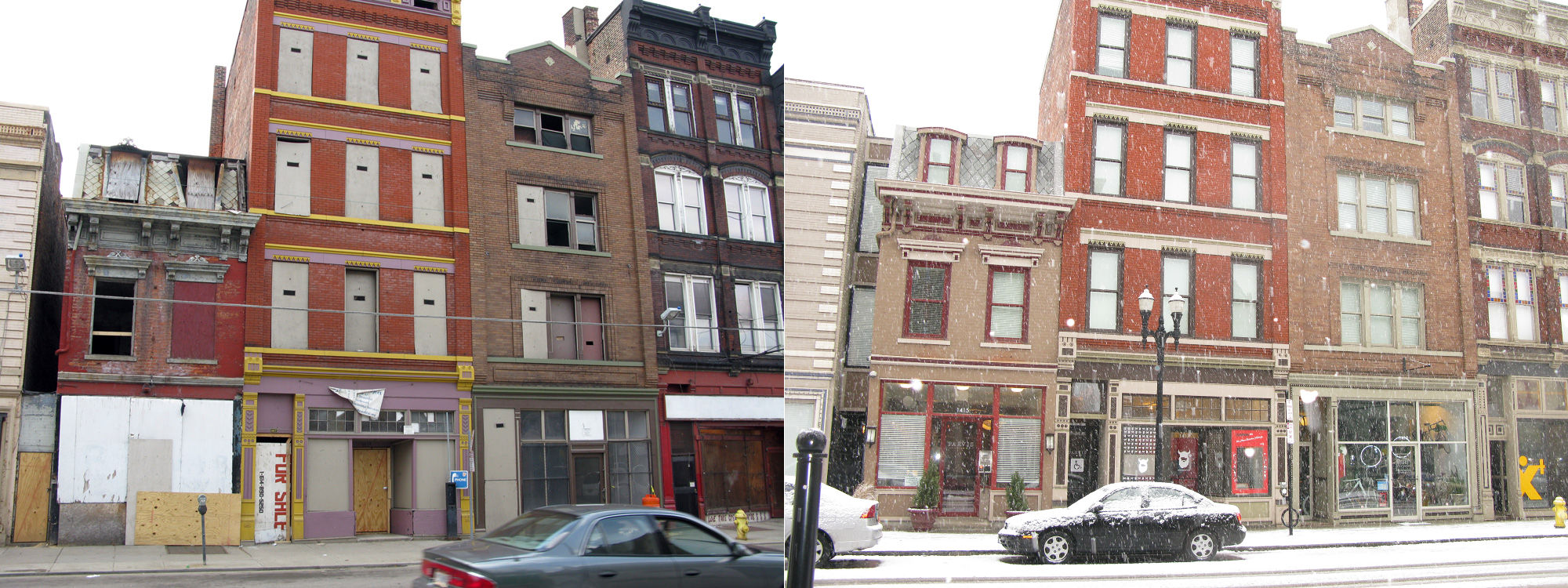
A comparison of a section of Vine Street from 2009 and 2013, showing redevelopment

Significant gentrification of the Over the Rhine community began just before and continued after the period of civil unrest, as developers found property values low enough to allow acquisition and redevelopment. A number of tech companies and nightlife spots have opened in the neighborhood. By 2007, several new community events had been organized. Several large Cincinnati companies, including Fifth Third Bank, Procter & Gamble and Kroger, announced support for reforms in the city, such as investment in schools and minority-hiring programs.

Police behavior and protocols were investigated, and changes were made to improve training and interaction with the community. On the ten-year anniversary of the protests and civil unrest, Cincinnati Enquirer reported that "[t]he riots neither initiated the racial tension nor the police reforms, but accelerated both." Among the reforms were the following:

- Training officers to deal with "low-light situations" (such as the alley where Timothy Thomas was fatally shot).
- Training officers how to recognize suspects' potential mental health issues and how to interact with mentally ill people.
- Cincinnati patrol cars were equipped with computers to give police officers access to complete and detailed criminal records.
- Changes in the department's "foot pursuit policy," requiring officers to "assess whether a pursuit is appropriate, taking into consideration the seriousness of the offense, whether the suspect is armed and their ability to apprehend at a later date."
- Requiring officers to complete "contact cards" after traffic stops, noting details about the car's driver and passengers, including race. This change arose from complaints of racial profiling in traffic stops.
- The Citizens Complaint Authority was created in 2002 to independently review all "serious uses of force" by police officers.
- In late 2003 the city 'updated Tasers for all officers after the death of Nathaniel Jones, an African-American man with drugs in his system." Jones died after officers "hit him repeatedly with their batons."

== See also ==
- List of incidents of civil unrest in the United States
