= Honolulu Police Commission =

The Honolulu Police Commission consists of seven Police Commissioners (members). They do not receive compensation for their five-year terms. Their terms are staggered, and each member serves until their replacements are appointed by the Mayor and confirmed by the City Council. They elect a chair and vice-chair from within their ranks each year.

In January 2017, the Honolulu Police Commission approved a $250,000 payout deal for controversial Police Chief Louis Kealoha without authorization from the Honolulu City Council. On December 15, 2020, he was ordered to pay back the money because he was convicted of felony conspiracy and obstruction of justice following a federal investigation.

On January 12, 2022, former Honolulu Police Commissioner Max Sword was arrested for conspiracy in connection with the payout to Kealoha, along with former city Managing Director Roy Amemiya and former Corporation Counsel for Honolulu Donna Leong.
