= Socialite =

Famous person known for socialising in upper-class society

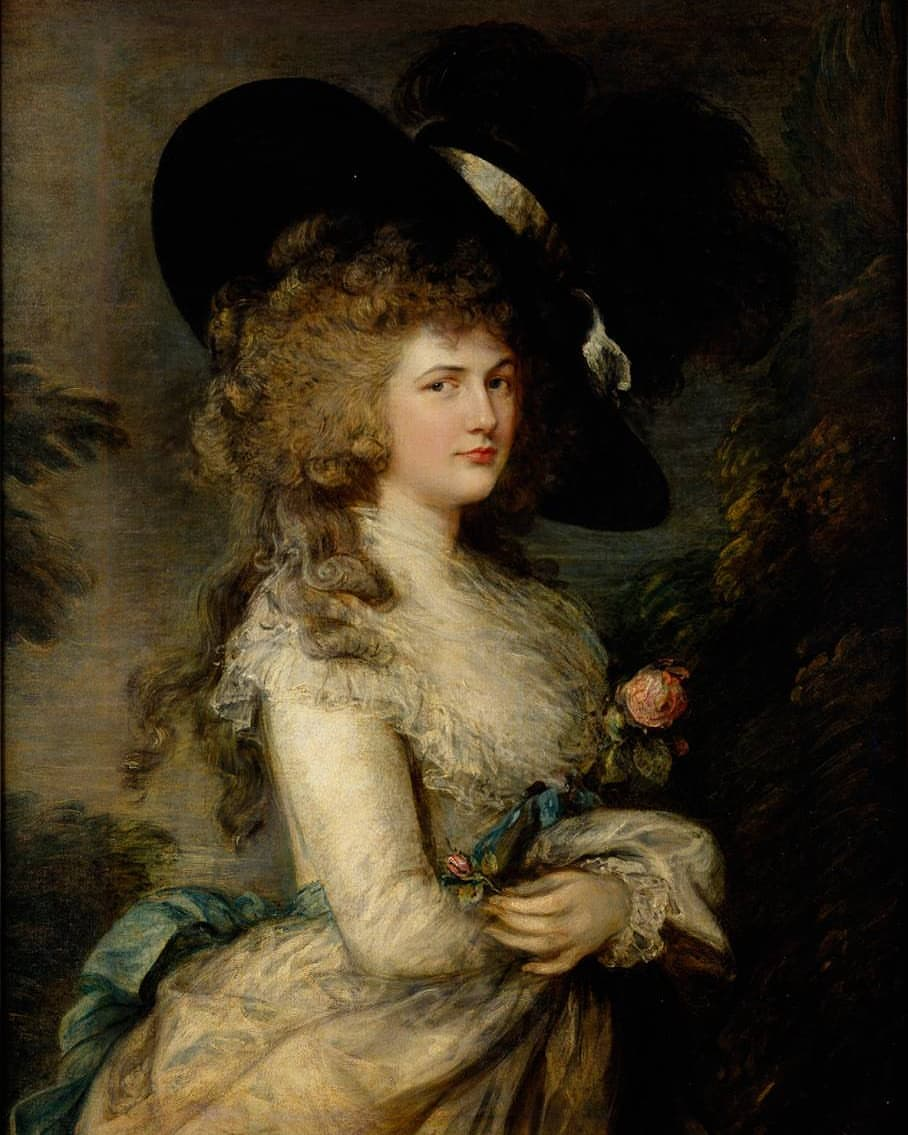
Portrait of Georgiana, Duchess of Devonshire by Thomas Gainsborough. Lady Georgiana Cavendish, (1757–1806), an English socialite from the late 18th century

A socialite is a person, typically a woman from a wealthy or aristocratic background, who is prominent in high society. A socialite generally spends a significant amount of time attending various fashionable social gatherings, instead of having traditional employment.

== Word history ==
The word socialite is first attested in 1909 in a Tennessee newspaper. It became popular by use in Time magazine in the 1920s.

== United Kingdom ==
Historically, most socialites in the United Kingdom were from the families of the aristocracy and landed gentry. Many socialites also had close familial or personal relationships to the British royal family.

Notable examples of British socialites are Beau Brummell, Lord Alvanley, the Marchioness of Londonderry, Daisy, Princess of Pless, Lady Diana Cooper, Mary Constance Wyndham, Lady Ursula d'Abo, Margaret Greville, Annabelle Neilson and the Mitford sisters. Since the 1960s, socialites have been drawn from a wider section of society, closer to the American model, with many socialites coming from families in business or from the world of celebrity. Despite this, the notion of the Sloane Ranger still emphasises many socialites' connections to Britain's ruling class. The Royal Borough of Kensington and Chelsea is widely regarded as the home of socialite activity in the UK. The television show Made in Chelsea has explored the lives of young socialites living in London in the 21st century.

== United States ==
American members of the Establishment, or an American "society" based on birth, breeding, education, and economic standing, were originally listed in the Social Register, a directory of the names and addresses of the "preferred social contacts" of the prominent families in the 19th century. In 1886, Louis Keller started to consolidate these lists and package them for sale.

=== 18th and 19th centuries ===
With the increase of wealth in the US in the 19th century, being a socialite developed into a role that brought power and influence. Women's lineage-based volunteering organizations, such as the Colonial Dames of America and the Daughters of the American Revolution, became popular among socialites during this time period.

=== 21st century ===
In the 21st century, the term "socialite" is still attached to being wealthy and socially recognized. The lines between being a socialite and a celebrity with an exuberant partying lifestyle have since become blurred due to the influence of both popular culture and the media, particularly when the status of being a celebrity is largely due to that lifestyle. Celebrity Paris Hilton is an example of a 21st-century socialite due to her ability to attract media attention and fame based only on her connections and associations. Hilton is the great-granddaughter of Conrad Hilton, the founder of Hilton Hotels & Resorts, and heiress to the Hilton Hotel fortune. Due to her outrageous lifestyle, Hilton was hailed by the media as "New York's leading It Girl" in 2001.

Gossip Girl, an American television series airing between September 2007 and December 2012, focuses on the lives of New York City socialites who live on Manhattan's Upper East Side. The show is a strong influence on how socialites are regarded in the 21st century because of the presence of scandal, wealth, and fashion in each episode. Pop culture gives the impression that by simply being wealthy and fashionable, an individual has the opportunity to become famous. Consequently, it is an individual's ability to climb the social ladder due to their wealth and recognition that makes them a socialite.

According to The New York Times, socialites spend between $98,000 and $455,000 per year (young and old, respectively) to maintain their roles as successful socialites. Just the evening wardrobe of an individual regularly attending society functions can cost $100,000 annually. Examples of modern-day American socialites include the Kardashian-Jenner family, Jill Kelley, Tinsley Mortimer, Olivia Palermo, Lauren Santo Domingo, Paris Hilton, Anna Delvey, Derek Blasberg, and Jean Shafiroff.

== Gender ==
The term has been called sexist. BuzzFeed advises its writers to "not use this sexist term ... and consider how you would describe a man in a similar circumstance."

== Gallery of notable socialites ==
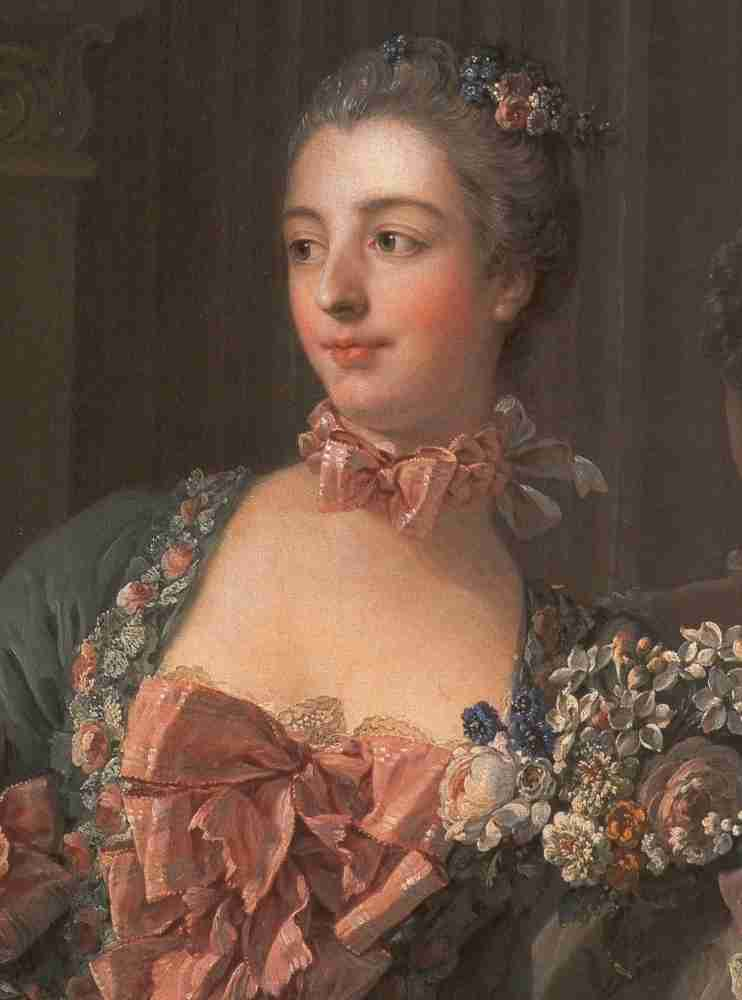
Madame de Pompadour (1721–1764)

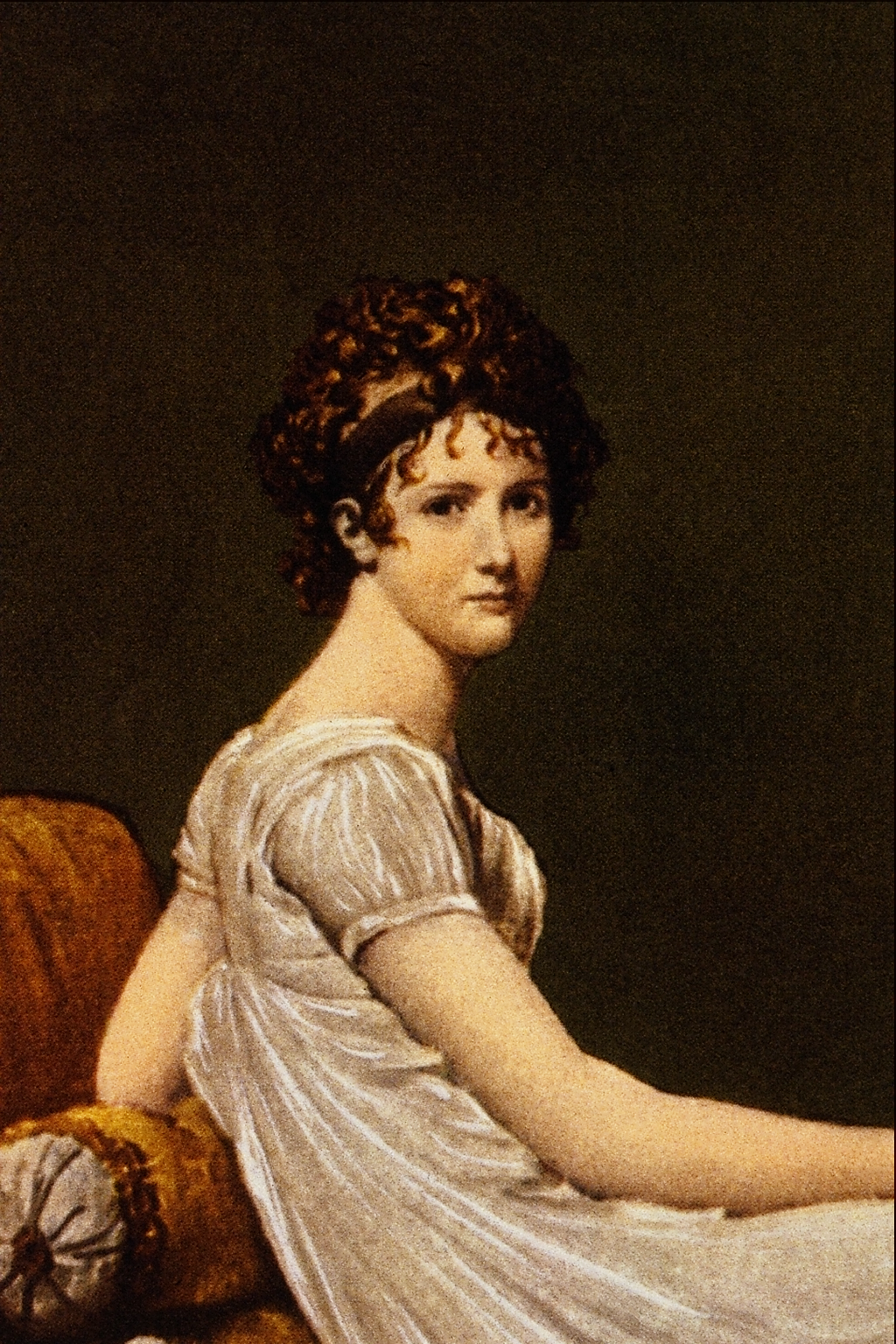
Madame Récamier (1777–1849)

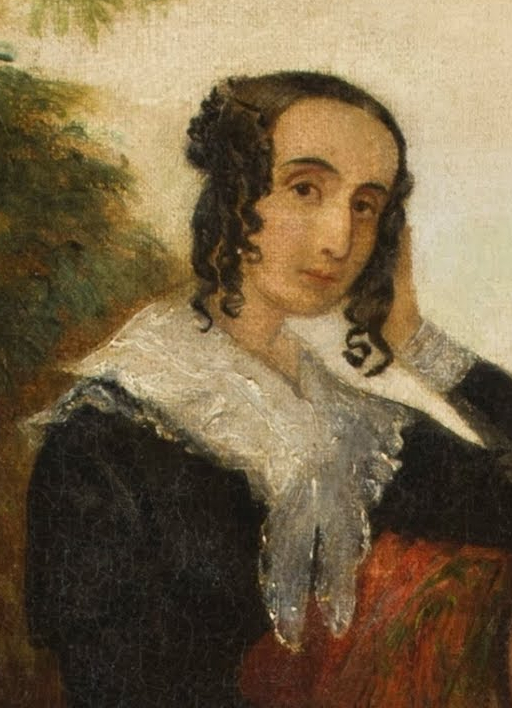
Mariquita Sánchez (1786–1868)

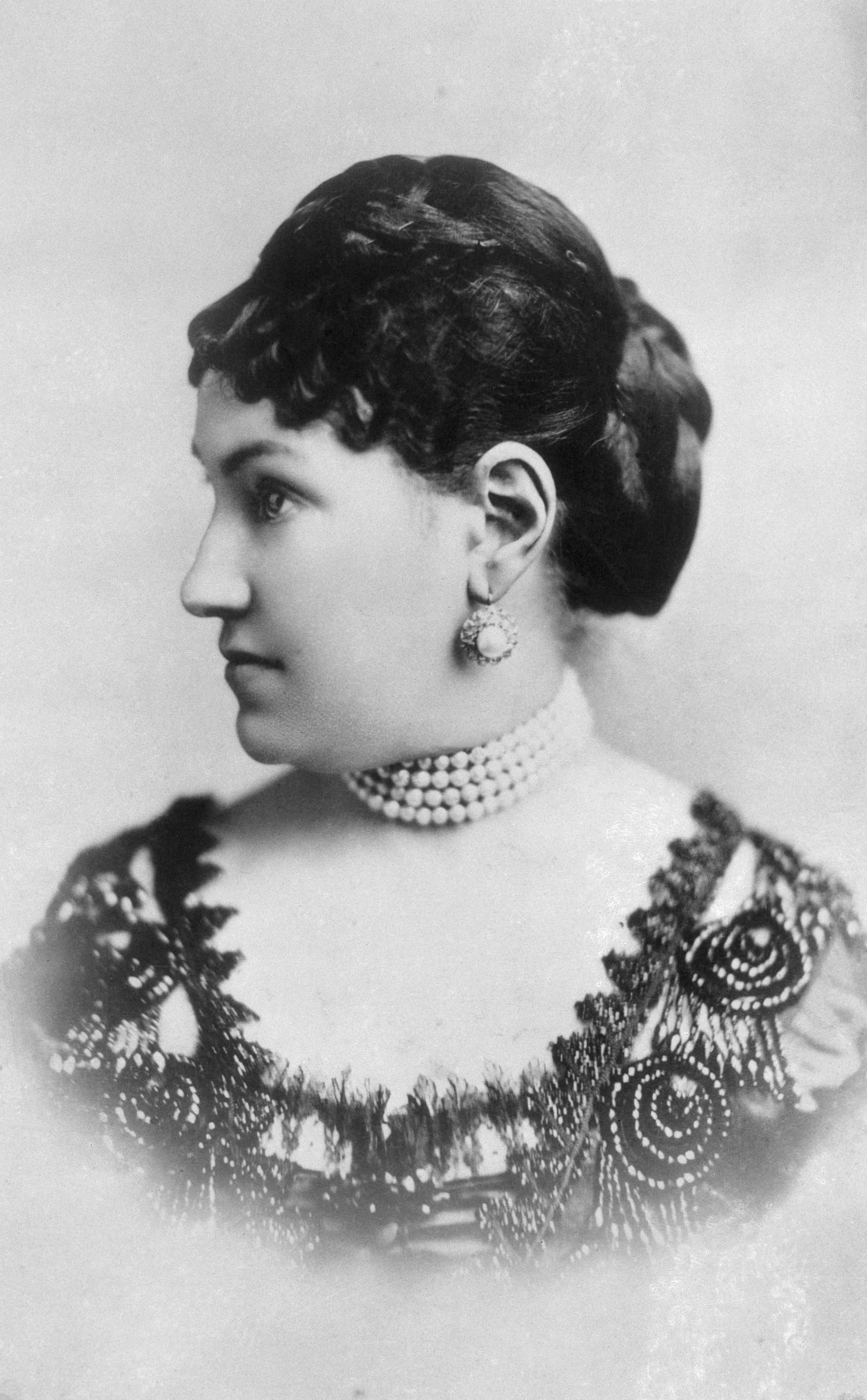
Caroline Astor (1830–1908)

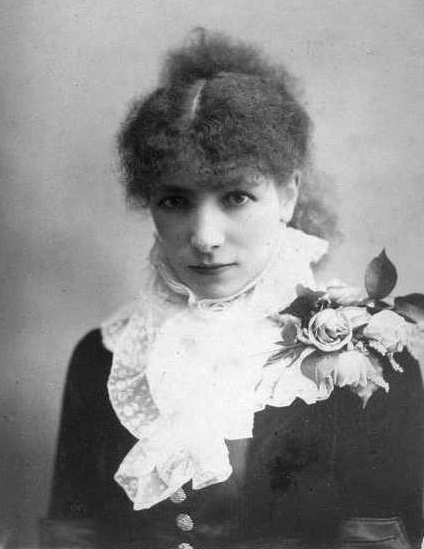
Sarah Bernhardt (1844–1923)

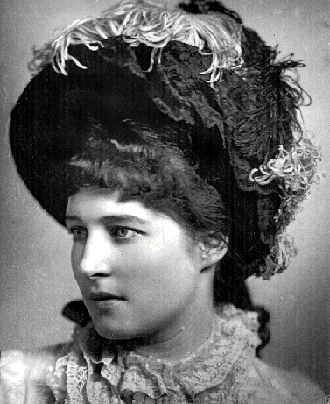
Lillie Langtry (1853–1929)

Margot Asquith (1864–1945)

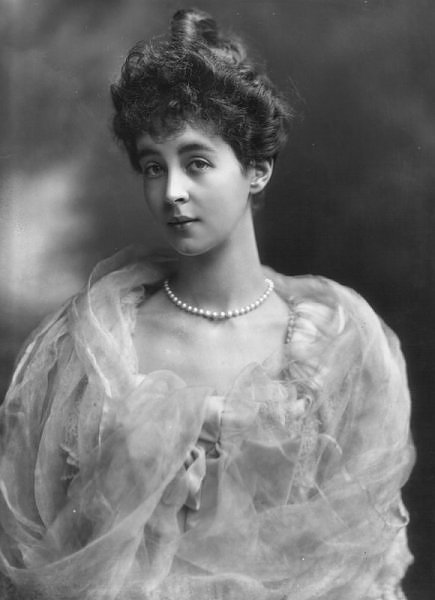
Consuelo Vanderbilt (1877–1964)

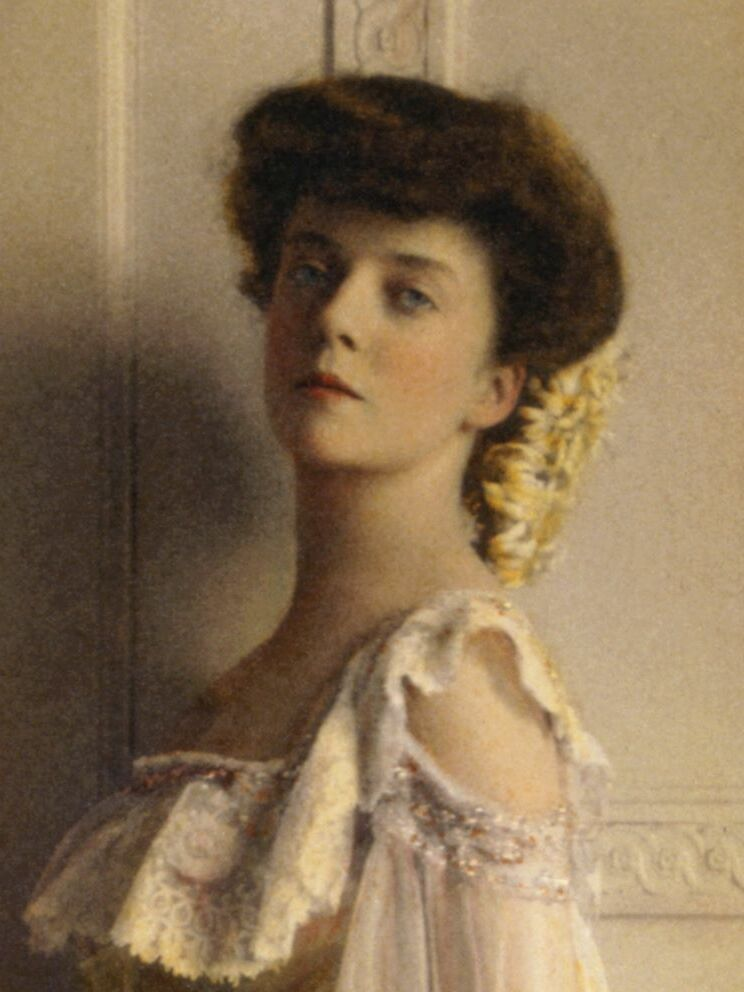
Alice Roosevelt (1884–1980)

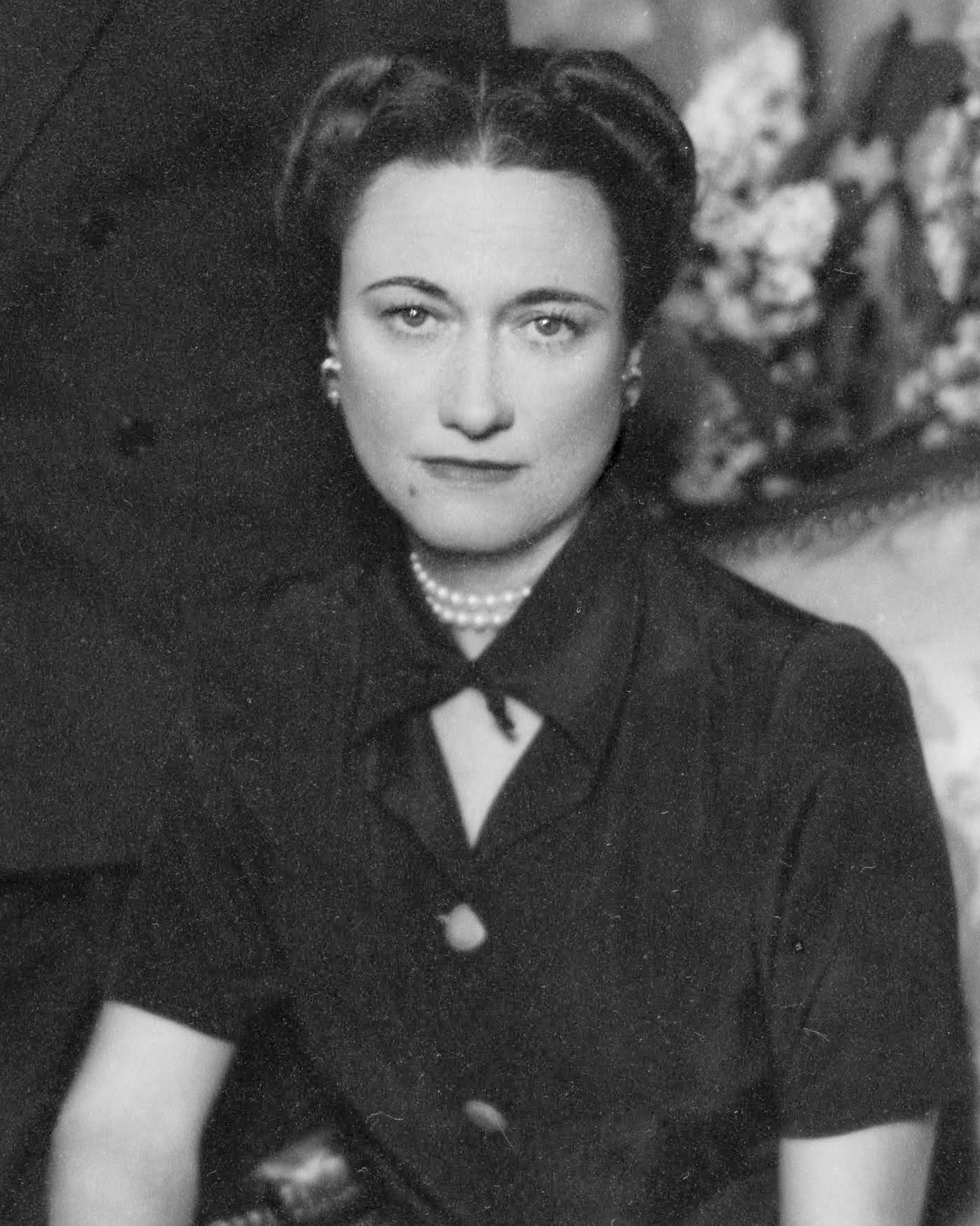
Wallis Simpson (1896–1986)

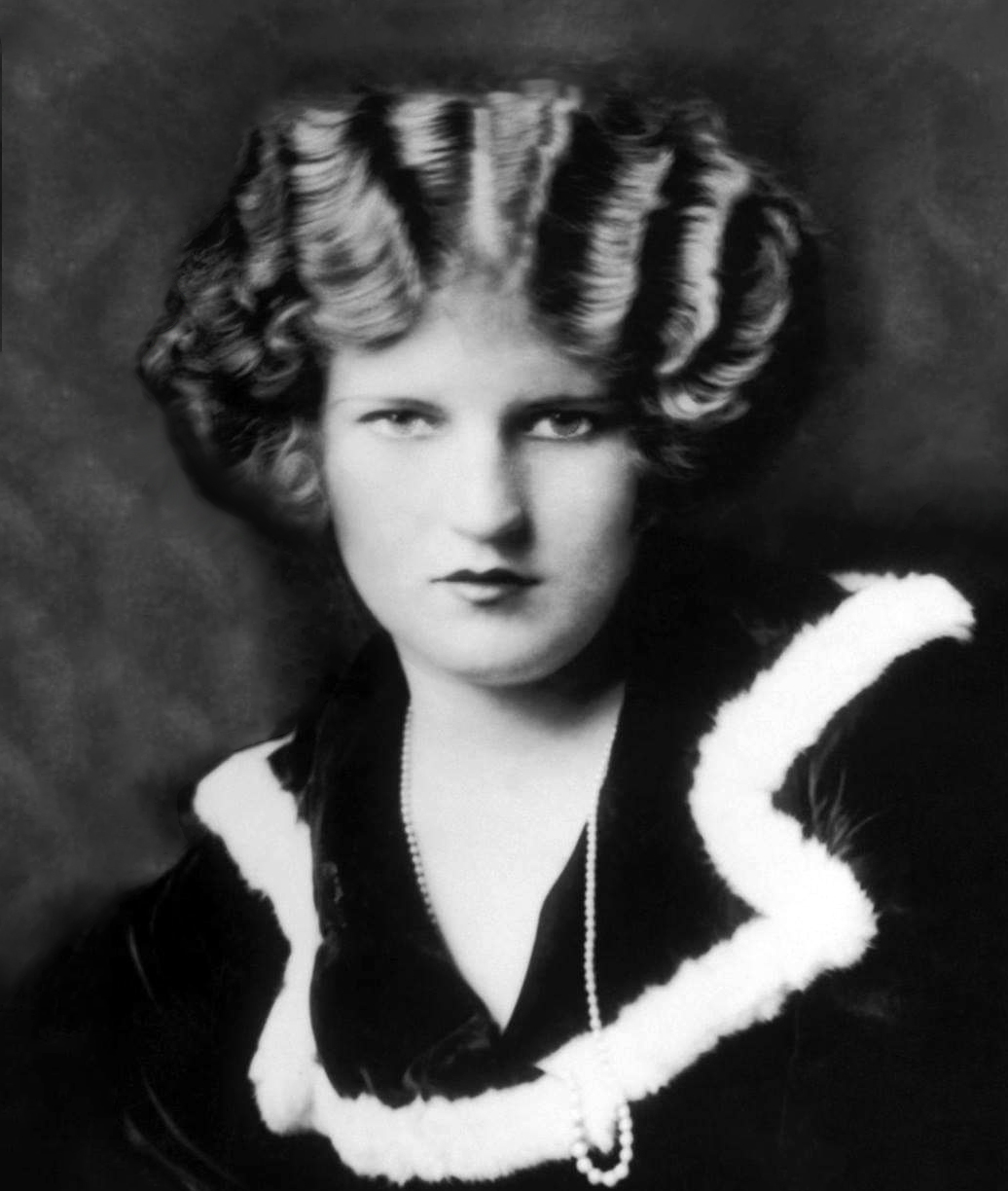
Zelda Fitzgerald (1900–1948)

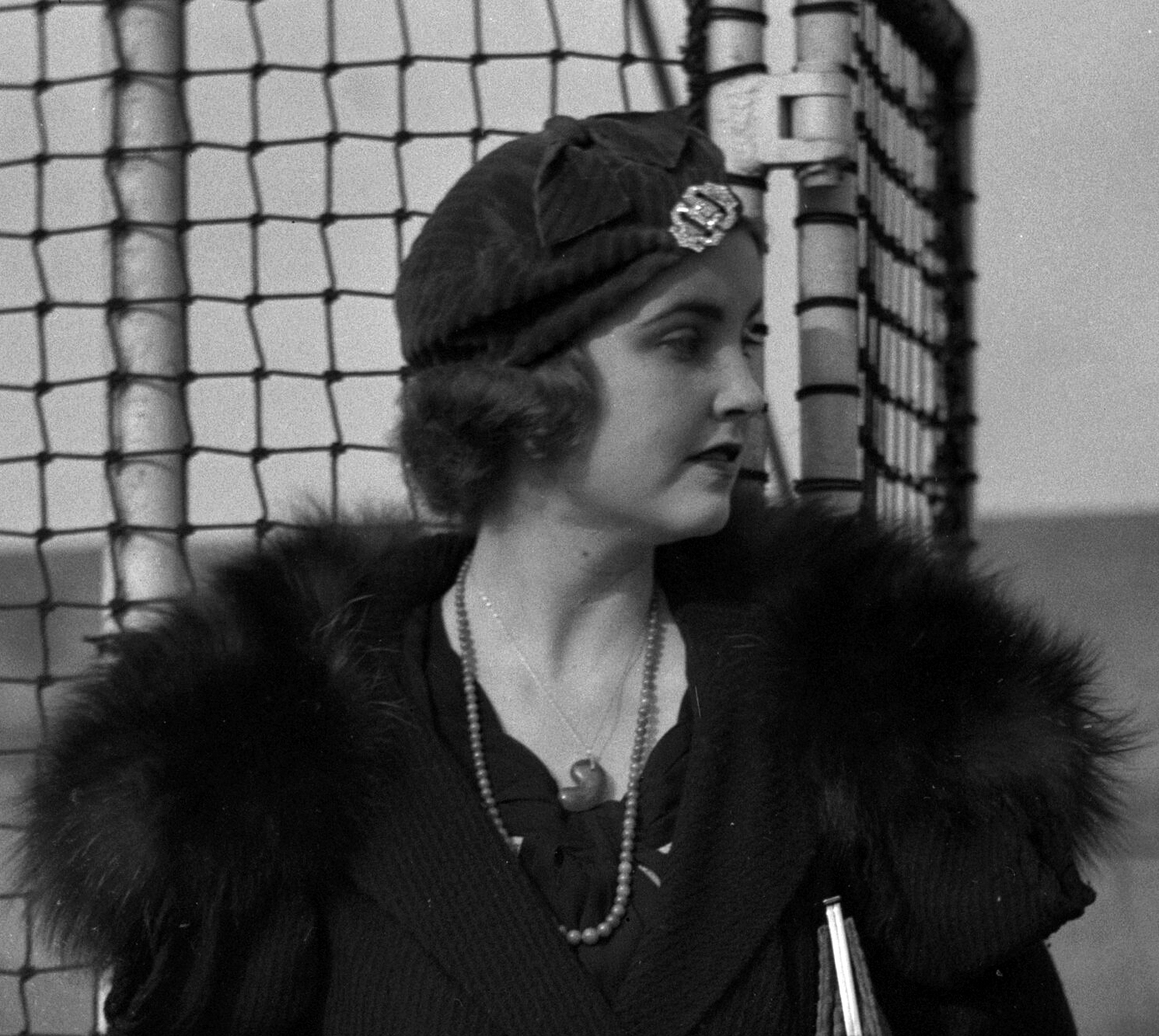
Barbara Hutton (1912–1979)

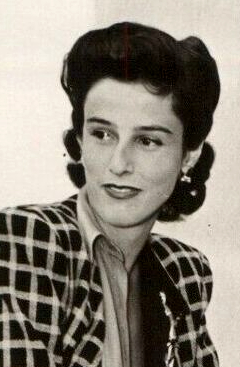
Babe Paley (1915–1978)

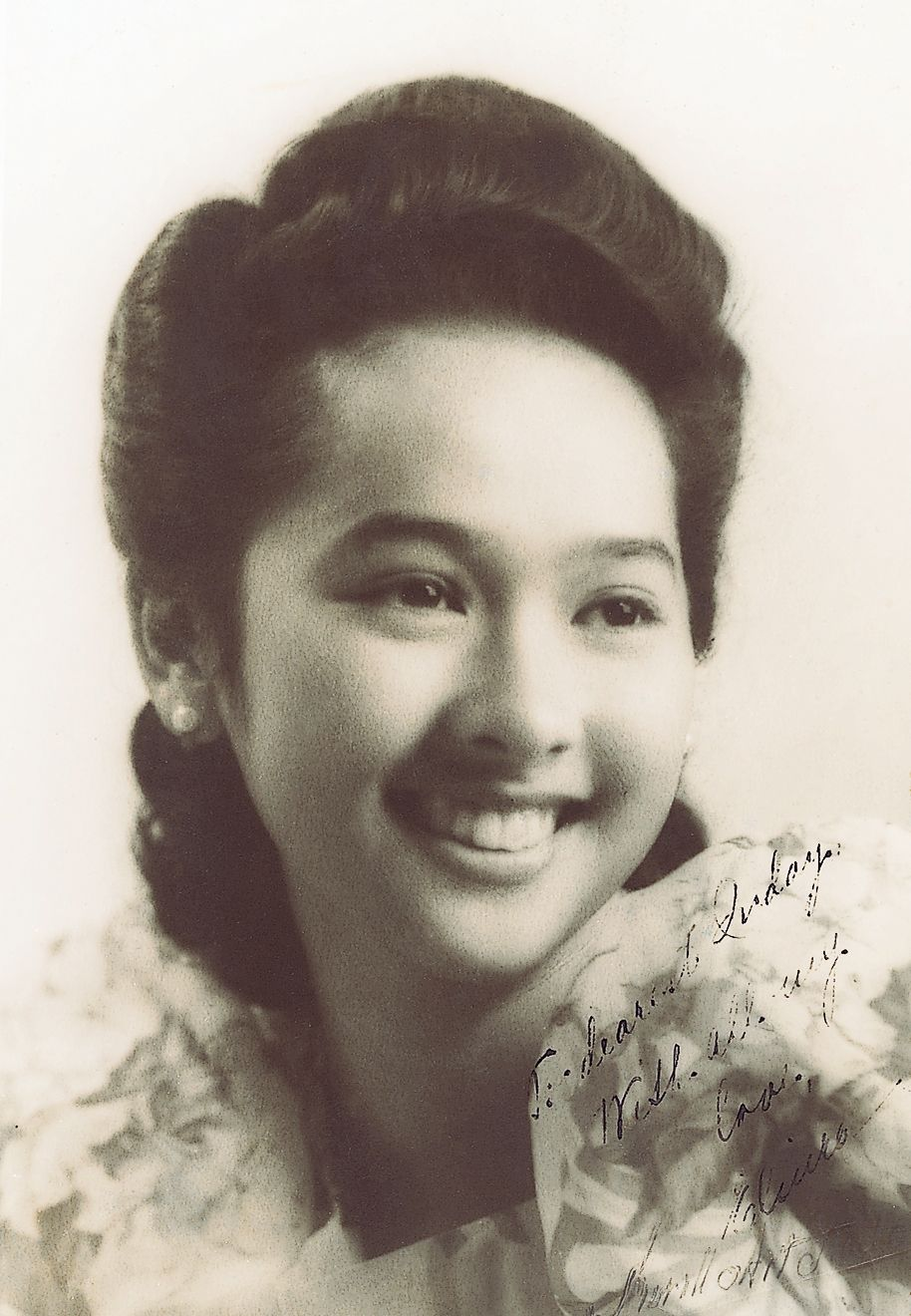
Elvira Manahan (1927–1986)

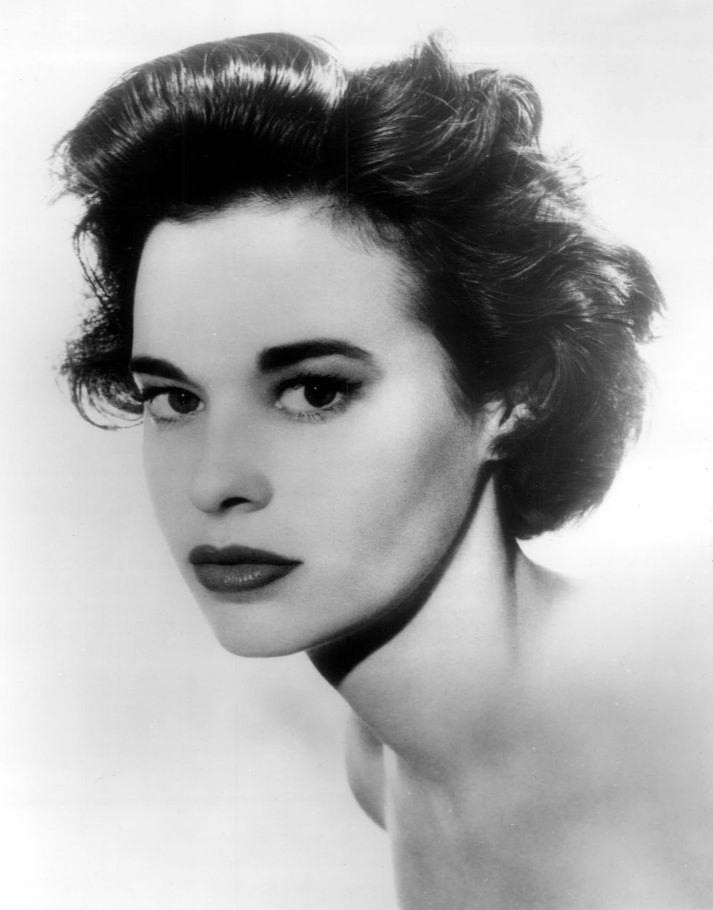
Gloria Vanderbilt (1924–2019)

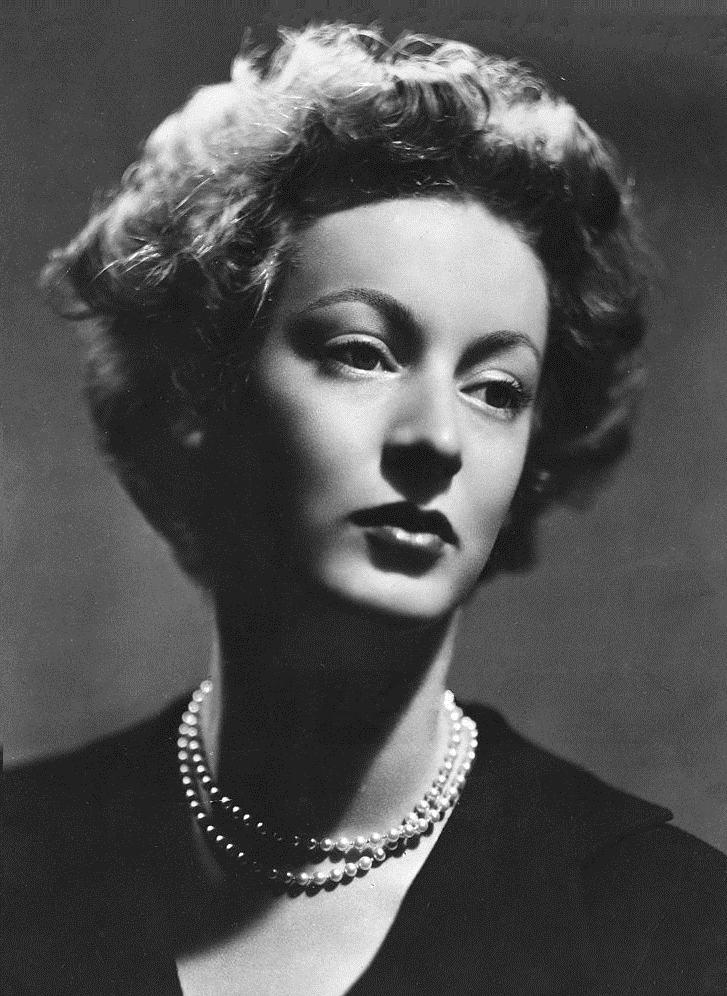
Marella Agnelli (1927–2019)

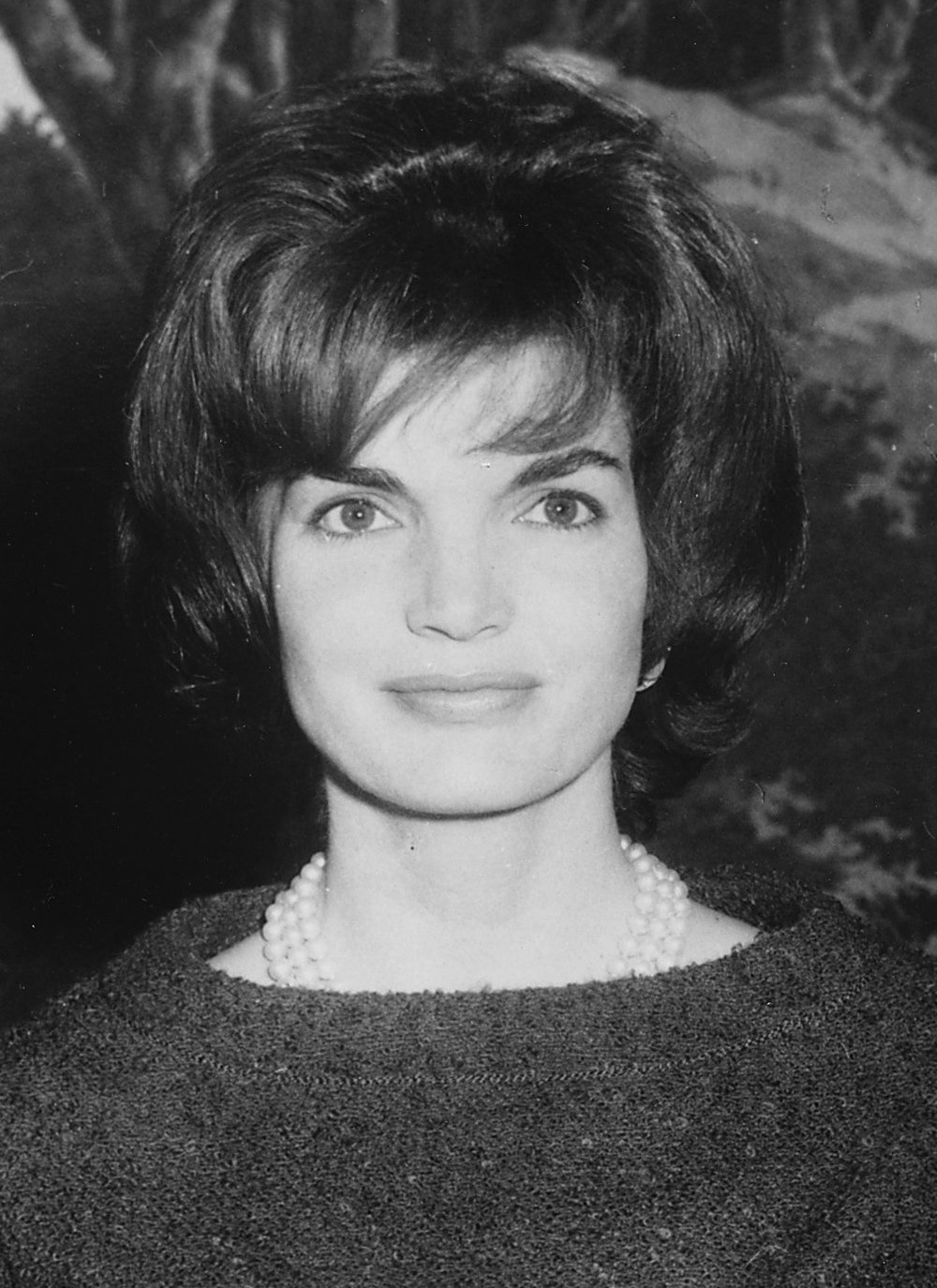
Jacqueline Kennedy Onassis (1929–1994)

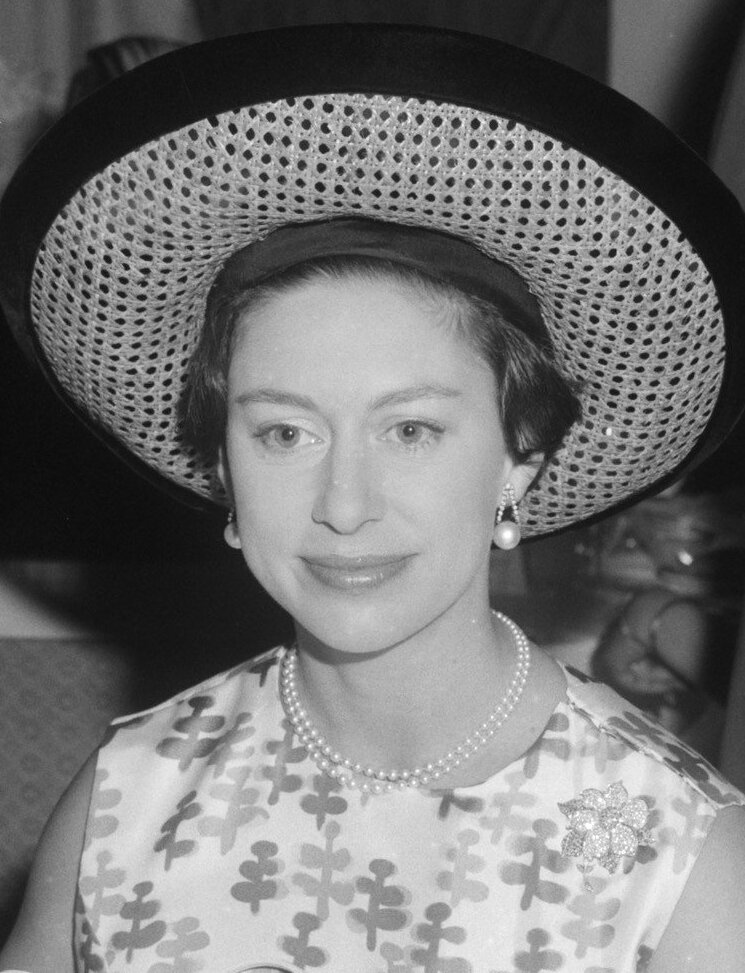
Princess Margaret (1930–2002)

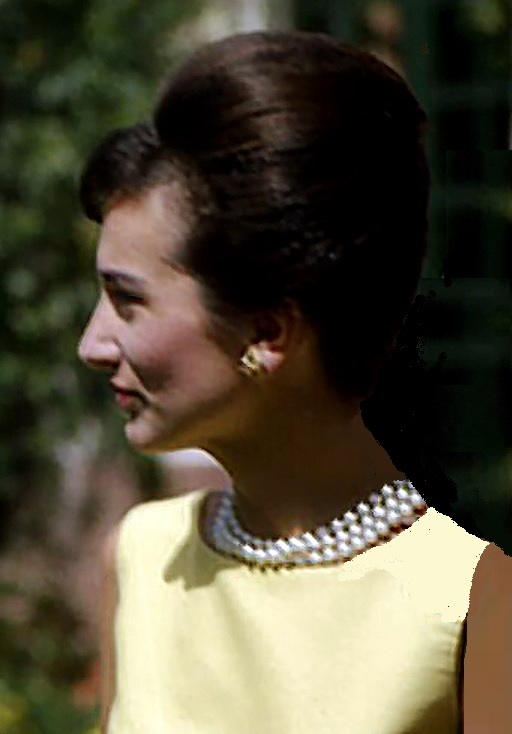
Lee Radziwill (1933–2019)

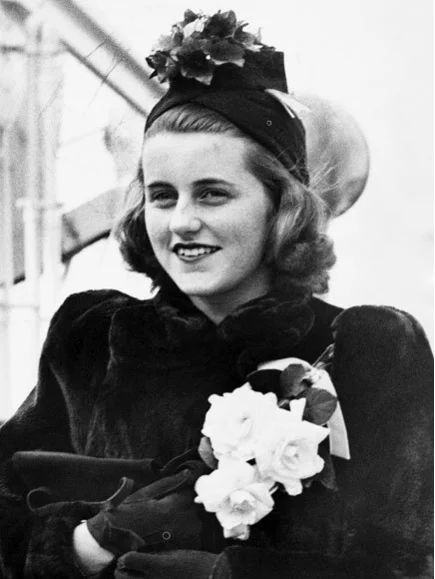
Kathleen Cavendish, Marchioness of Hartington (1920–1948)

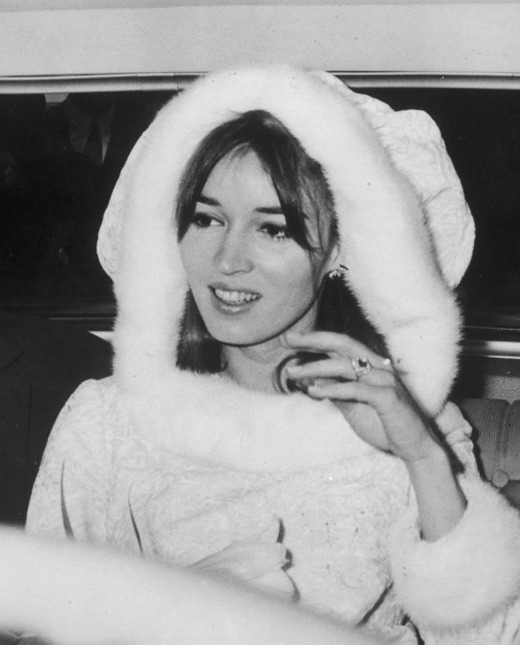
Talitha Getty (1940–1971)

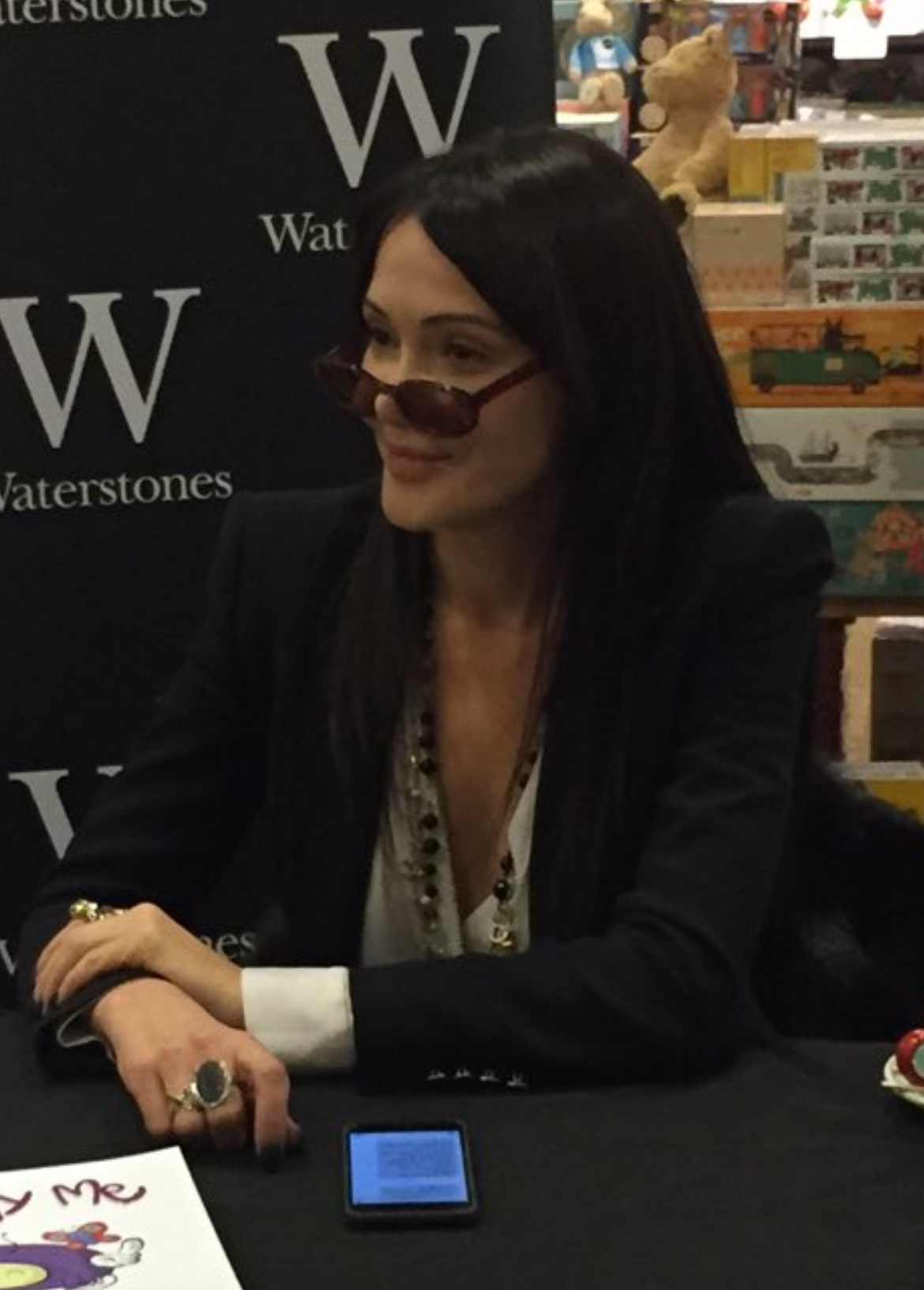
Annabelle Neilson (1969–2018)

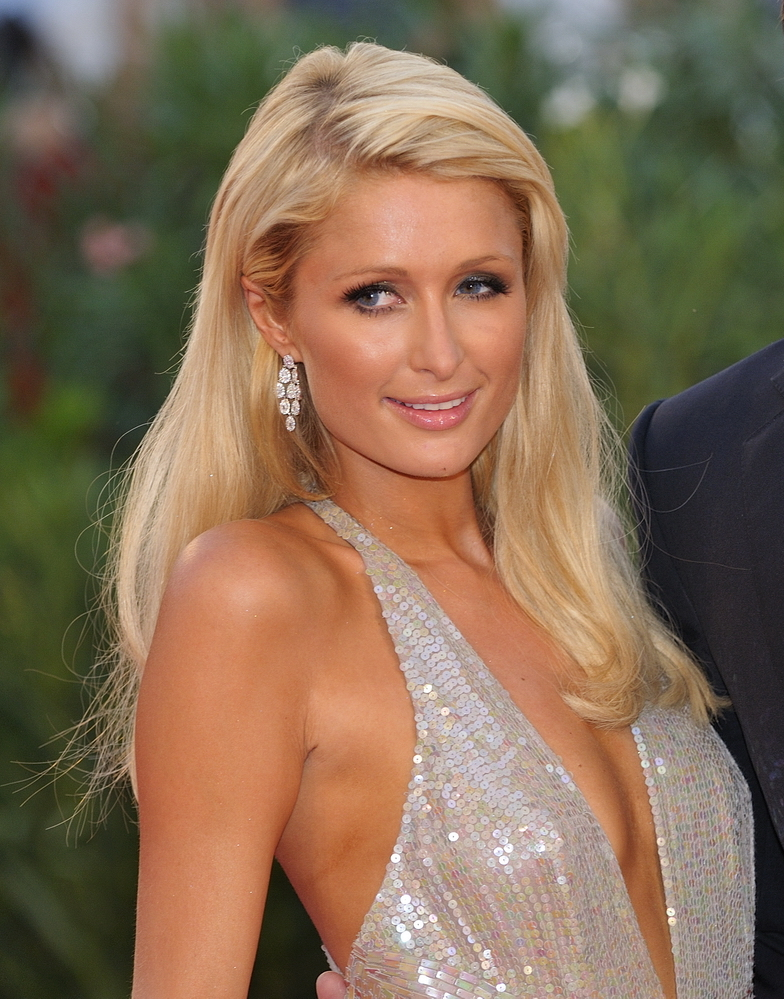
Paris Hilton (born 1981)

== See also ==
- Conspicuous leisure
- Debutante
- Elitism
- Famous for being famous
- In-groups and out-groups
- International Debutante Ball
- It girl
- Jet set
- List of American heiresses
- Sloane Ranger
- Social environment
- Social identity theory
- Southern belle
- Upper class
- White Anglo-Saxon Protestant
- Yuppie
