= Mid-Pacific Institute =

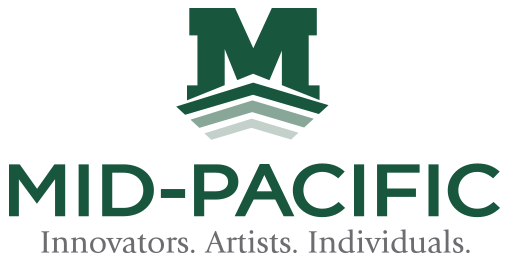
- Mid-Pacific Institute seal

Location
- 2445 Kaala Street; Honolulu, Hawaii 96822; United States; 21.303269°N 157.816933°W

Information
- Type: Private, Day, College-prep
- Religious affiliation: Christian
- Established: 1908
- President: Paul Turnbull
- Grades: Pre-K–12
- Enrollment: 1,400
- Campus size: 43 acres (0.17 km^{2})
- Campus type: Urban
- Colors: Green and white
- Athletics: Mid-Pacific Owls
- Athletics conference: Interscholastic League of Honolulu
- Mascot: Pueo (Hawaiian short-eared owl)
- Newspaper: Na Pueo
- Website: www.midpac.edu

Mid-Pacific Institute is a private, co-educational college preparatory school for grades preschool through twelve in Honolulu, Hawaii with an approximate enrollment of 1,400 students, the majority of whom are from Hawaii (although many also come from other states and other countries, such as Japan, South Korea, China, Canada, Australia, Marshall Islands and countries in Europe and Africa). The school offers programs of study in the International Baccalaureate Diploma Programme and the Mid-Pacific School of the Arts (MPSA). Mid-Pacific Institute is located on 43 acres (170,000 m^{2}) in Manoa, near the University of Hawaii, close to downtown Honolulu.

== History ==
The high school was established through the 1908 merger of Kawaiahaʻo Seminary for Girls, founded in 1864, Mills Institute for Boys, founded in 1892, the Okumura Japanese Boarding School, and the Korean Methodist School for Boys and Girls. All four schools were founded by missionaries, with the goal of teaching English to native Hawaiians, Japanese, Chinese, Koreans, and other nationalities. It was established that the school must remain Christian so long as the original land was in use. However, students are allowed to practice any religion of their choice. From its inception, Mid-Pacific was founded on the ideals of a global worldview, and the belief that people of diverse backgrounds and cultures should come together to be a powerful voice for understanding. A birthplace for inspiring ideas that impact local and international communities. Even members of the Hawaiian royal family attended the schools. By opening its doors to students with no prejudice over race and class status, Mid-Pacific was a part of a growing movement toward greater social acceptance that was rarely seen in the repressive oligarchical control within the Territory of Hawaii.

"At Mid-Pacific, an attempt was made to bring students of all races together in a boarding school and to encourage democracy in education. Because it was subsidized by members of the Damon, Wilcox, and Atherton families- all missionary descendants-the fees were relatively low, and many ambitious Chinese and Japanese youngsters enrolled."

— Professor Lawrence H. Fuchs, Hawaii Pono

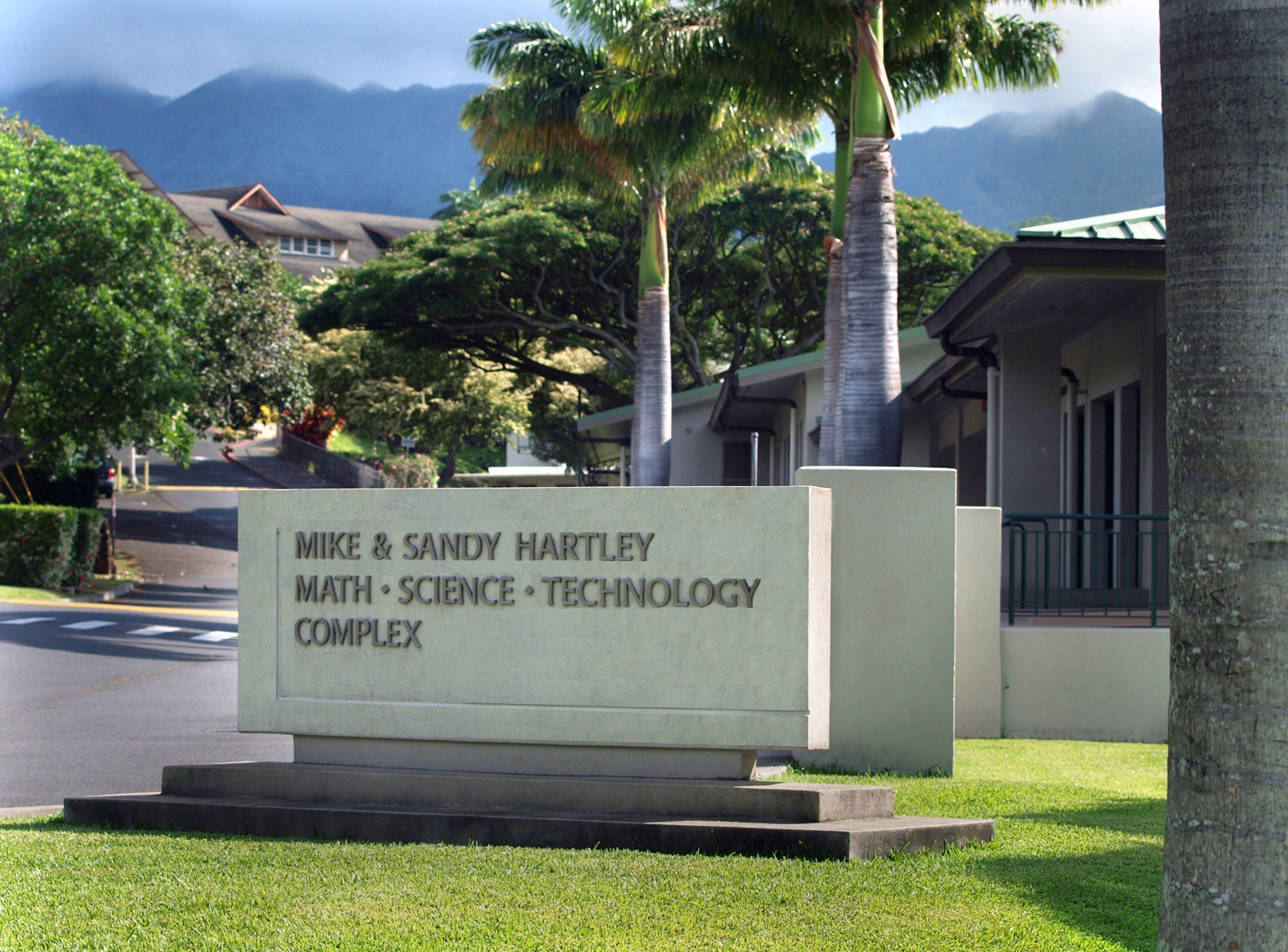
Tech Center and Kawaiahao Hall on the Campus of Mid-Pacific Institute

A merger of the schools was suggested in 1905 and the Hawaiian Board of Foreign Missions purchased 35 acres (14 ha) of land in Manoa valley. A ceremony was held on May 31, 1906, for the new school campus, which officially opened in 1908. The schools continued to operate independently while co-existing in the new campus until the coeducation plan went into effect in the fall of 1922 and by June 1923 Mid-Pacific Institute became the common shared name.

The school added an elementary school when it merged with Epiphany School (which had been established as an elementary mission school by the Episcopal Church in 1937) in 2004. The school had an on-campus dormitory from 1908 until it was closed in November 2003 and replaced by the new elementary school.

On February 23, 2012, Mid-Pacific announced it had ordered 1,500 iPads for all students and faculty, making it one of the first schools in the nation to equip every student K-12 with an iPad.

In 2024, Mid-Pacific became one of the first schools in the state to fully embrace and integrate artificial intelligence into the academic curriculum and established the Mid-Pacific AI Advisory Council.

== Mid-Pacific School of the Arts (MPSA) ==
The Mid-Pacific School of the Arts offers a preprofessional certificate program in dance, instrumental music, drama, and fine arts. The MPSA is the only certified program of its kind in the state of Hawaii. Students who complete their studies often move on to professional conservatories and other schools of performing and fine arts. Mid-Pacific is unique in requiring all of its students to take a number of arts electives.

Students can take classes in dance, hula, instrumental music, media, musical theatre, theatre, visual arts, and voice.

The Mid-Pacific School of the Arts, which was formally established in 1991, is a member of the International Network of Performing and Visual Arts Schools and was among the first six schools in the nation to be recognized by the organization as a Network Star School. It also received the Arts Excellence Award from the Hawaii Alliance for Arts Education.

== The International Baccalaureate ==
The International Baccalaureate Diploma Programme is a regarded two-year pre-university educational program that emphasizes rigorous, internationally based curriculum standards and promotes awareness and appreciation of global issues and perspectives. Students must take six subjects, and must also pass 3 extra requirements, for example, Theory of Knowledge (ToK), a 4000-word Extended Essay (EE), and a requirement of at least a total of 150 hours in CAS (Creativity, Action, Service). Mid-Pacific Institute was the first secondary school in the state of Hawaii to offer the International Baccalaureate Diploma Programme. The IB is administered by the International Baccalaureate Organization, which was founded in the 1968 in Geneva, Switzerland.

== Mid-Pacific Athletics ==
The school's athletic affiliation is with the Interscholastic League of Honolulu. Mid-Pacific participates in intermediate, junior varsity and varsity level soccer, water polo, cross country, track & field, golf, softball, baseball, basketball, canoe paddling, tennis, bowling, volleyball, canoe paddling, football, flag football, swimming, wrestling, sailing, judo, and kayaking. Mid-Pacific was one of nineteen smaller private schools that made up a larger unified team called Pac-5 Wolfpack, which allows the students to participate in certain high school athletic competition. Pac-Five began in 1973 to allow smaller institutions (of 1000 or fewer students per school) to form a football team and compete at a varsity level with bigger schools. Since 2023, Mid-Pacific fields all of its own teams and only participates in Pac-5 for football and competitive cheerleading.

Mid-Pacific has won state championships in baseball (1990-1992, 2002, 2013), Girls' Basketball (2017), Girls' Soccer (2011–2013), Boys' Soccer (2008, 2010, 2014, 2015), Boys' Sporter Air Riflery (2013, 2015, 2018, 2021), Girls' Sporter Air Riflery (2014, 2018), Girls' Swimming & Diving (2013, 2015), Boys' Canoe Paddling (2007), Boys' Golf (1985) and Softball (2011-2012). Through their affiliation with Pac-Five, they have also been part of state Football championships in 1982 and 1985.

== Alma mater ==
Mid-Pacific's Alma mater was written by John L. Hopwood

== Notable alumni and faculty ==
- Keiko Agena (1991), actor
- Peter Apo (1957), musician and former member of the Office of Hawaiian Affairs Board of Trustee
- Daniel Bess (1995), actor
- Zoe Cipres, actor
- Radiant Cordero (2008), member of the Honolulu City Council
- Les Ihara, Jr. (1969), member of the Hawaii Senate
- Will Ireton, former baseball player and translator for Shohei Ohtani
- Irene ʻĪʻī Brown Holloway, philanthropist
- Ayaka Kimura (2000), actor, former member of Coconuts Musume in Hello! Project
- Maxine Hong Kingston, novelist, former faculty member
- Isiah Kiner-Falefa (2013), professional baseball infielder for the Boston Red Sox of Major League Baseball
- Rob Letterman (1988), American film director, writer and voice actor
- Kaiwi Lyman-Mersereau (2002), actor
- Lisa Matsumoto, author and playwright
- Chuck Mau (1926), former territorial Hawaii Democratic Party Chairman
- Ronald Moon (1958), Chief Justice of the Hawaii State Supreme Court
- Scott Nishimoto (1992), member of the Hawaii House of Representatives
- Steere Noda (1911), former member of Hawaii Senate
- Mary Kawena Pukui (1910), author, Hawaiian scholar, educator
- Peter Steigerwald (1992), comic book artist for Top Cow and later Aspen Comics
- Kelly Sueda (1991), painter, art collector
- Floyd Takeuchi (1971), media executive, publisher
- Glenn Wakai, Hawai'i State Senator
- Matt Weyer (2006), member of the Honolulu City Council
- Samuel Yamashita (1964), professor, author
- Kenichi Zenimura (1918), baseball player and promoter
