= Matt Weyer =

American politician

Member of the Honolulu City Council from District II
- Incumbent
- Assumed office January 2023
- Preceded by: Heidi Tsuneyoshi

Personal details
- Born: 1987 or 1988 (age 37–38)
- Party: Democratic
- Education: University of Hawaiʻi at Mānoa (BA, MPA, JD)

Matt Weyer is an American politician serving as a member of the Honolulu City Council, representing District II. District VII encompasses parts of Waipahu, Mililani, and Koʻolaupoko, as well as all of Wahiawā and the North Shore. First elected in 2022, Weyer was one of six out LGBTQ officials elected in Hawaii that year. Weyer assumed office in January 2023 and won re-election unopposed in August 2026.

In September 2026, Weyer announced his candidacy for the 2028 Honolulu mayoral election.

== Early life and career ==
Weyer grew up in Waikele and graduated from Mid-Pacific Institute. He attended the University of Hawaiʻi at Mānoa, where he earned a Bachelor of Arts in peace studies and communicology, a Master of Public Administration, and a Juris Doctor with certificates in environmental law and Native Hawaiian law from the William S. Richardson School of Law.

Before running for public office, Weyer worked as a city prosecutor and practiced law as an attorney. He also served as policy and fiscal director for Honolulu City Council Chair Tommy Waters and served three terms on the Waipahu Neighborhood Board. Immediately prior to his election to the City Council, he worked in the City and County of Honolulu's Department of Community Services.

== Political career ==
==== Elections ====
In 2022, Weyer ran for the open District II seat on the Honolulu City Council after incumbent Councilmember Heidi Tsuneyoshi vacated the seat to run for governor. Although Honolulu municipal elections are officially nonpartisan, Weyer lists his party affiliation as a member of the Democratic Party of Hawaii on state Campaign Spending Commission filings. In the August 13, 2022 primary election, Weyer placed first in a five-candidate field, advancing to a general election runoff against second-place finisher Makua Rothman. Weyer won the November 8, 2022 general election with 55.6% of the vote and took office on January 2, 2023. Weyer was one of the six out LGBTQIA+ officials elected in Hawaii that year.

In 2026, Weyer ran unopposed for a second term. Under Honolulu charter rules, he won re-election outright in the August 8, 2026 primary election, eliminating the need for a November general election for the seat.

==== Honolulu City Council ====
According to reporting by Honolulu Civil Beat, Weyer frequently aligns on policy matters with fellow young progressive councilmembers Radiant Cordero and Tyler Dos Santos-Tam. Following a 2025 council reorganization, Weyer was removed from committee leadership positions by the council majority.

During his tenure, Weyer has focused on North Shore community infrastructure, environmental regulation, and disaster response. He advocated alongside North Shore residents for city plans to establish a first responders center.

Following severe Kona low flooding in Haleʻiwa and Waialua in March 2026, Weyer coordinated constituent evacuations to Leilehua High School and subsequently advocated for expanded hurricane and flood preparedness on Oahu.

In November 2026, Weyer was one of five Honolulu City Councilmembers named in a lawsuit alleging violations of Hawaii's open-meetings law (the Sunshine Law) in connection with an October 2026 gathering at a local restaurant.
