= Joey Manahan =

American politician (born 1971)

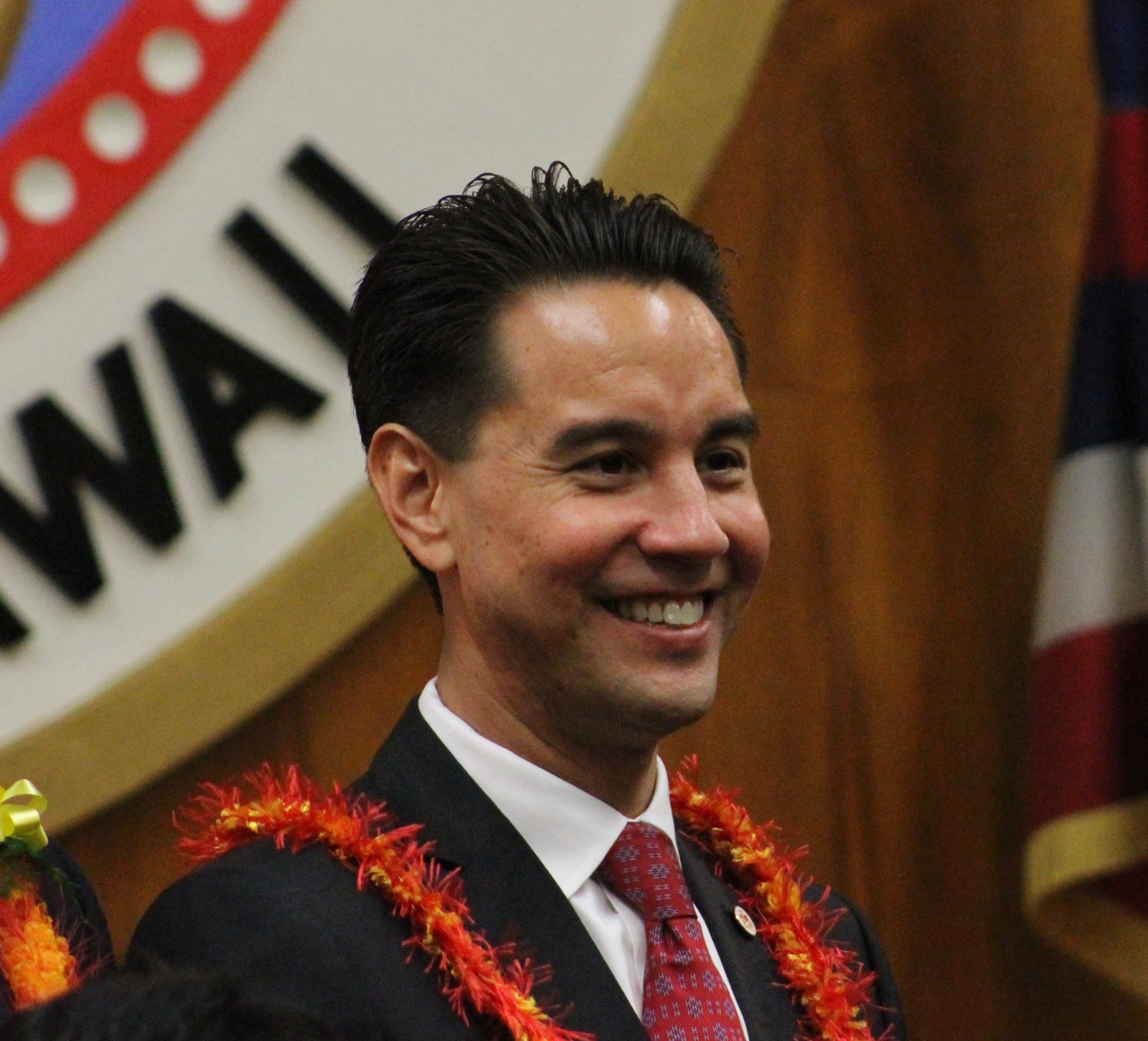
- Manahan in 2015

Member of the Honolulu City Council from District 7
- In office January 2, 2013 – January 1, 2021
- Preceded by: Romeo Munoz Cachola
- Succeeded by: Radiant Cordero

Vice Speaker of the Hawaii House of Representatives
- In office 2011–2013
- Preceded by: Michael Y. Magaoay
- Succeeded by: John Mizuno

Member of the Hawaii House of Representatives from the 29th district
- In office January 4, 2007 – January 16, 2013
- Preceded by: Felipe "Jun" Abinsay, Jr.
- Succeeded by: Karl Rhoads

Personal details
- Born: José María Brías Manahan; 1971 (age 54–55) Makati, Philippines
- Party: Democratic
- Spouse: Maan Santos
- Relatives: Elvira Manahan (grandmother); Manuel Manahan (grandnephew)

José María Brías (Joey) Manahan (born 1971) is a Filipino American politician from the state of Hawaii. Manahan is a former member of the Honolulu City Council and served as the Chair of the Budget Committee and Vice-Chair of the Transportation Committee.

Manahan was also the Oahu representative and President of the Hawai‘i State Association of Counties’ (HSAC) Executive Committee, whose members consist of the four island counties of the State of Hawai‘i – Kauai, Oahu, Maui, and Hawai’i counties. HSAC advocates for county programs and services and represents the county governments before the Hawai‘i State Legislature, administrative agencies, and the federal government.

He has served a combined 13 years in elected office in both the Honolulu City Council and the Hawai‘i State House of Representatives.

As a member of the Democratic Party, Manahan is a former member of the Hawaii House of Representatives, serving from 2007 through 2013, and as vice speaker in 2011 and 2012.

== Early life ==
Manahan was born in Makati, Philippines, in 1971. He is the grandnephew of Manuel Manahan, who served in the Senate of the Philippines, and grandson of Filipino actress Elvira Manahan.

Manahan's father died when he was young. He moved with his mother to the San Francisco Bay Area at the age of 10, where he attended Bellarmine College Preparatory School. His mother remarried in 1991, when the family moved to Hawaii. Manahan attended community college in California, before transferring to the University of Hawaii.

== Political career ==
While he studied at the University of Hawaii, Manahan became interested in his identity as a Filipino American and worked with Filipino immigrants. Through this program, he was introduced to Dennis Arakaki, a member of the Hawaii House of Representatives, who mentored him. He later worked for Arakaki as a legislative assistant, and for State Senator Donna Mercado Kim.

Manahan was first elected to the State House in 2006, winning by 11 votes. In 2012, Manahan announced that he would not seek reelection to the State House, and would instead run for the Honolulu City Council in the 2012 elections, and he won.

Manahan represented Honolulu City Council District 7, which includes Kalihi, lwilei, Kalihi Kai, Mapunapuna, Salt Lake, Aliamanu, Hickam, Foster Village, Ford Island, and Sand Island. Manahan has held several leadership positions like vice speaker of the Hawaii House of Representatives and the chair of the Committee on Budget, as well as vice-chair of the Committee on Transportation for the Honolulu City Council.

As a state representative, Manahan initiated two key projects for his district—the Modernization of Farrington High School and the Kuhio Park Terrace Modernization project.

He ran in the 2014 election to represent Hawaii's 1st congressional district in the United States House of Representatives, but finished sixth in the Democratic primary held in August 2014.

In 2021 he took a job as the director for government relations and public involvement at the Honolulu Authority for Rapid Transportation (HART). He left in November 2025.

== Personal ==
Manahan is married to Maan Santos.
