= Samuel H. Yamashita =

American historian of Japan

Samuel Hideo Yamashita (born 1946) is an American historian and Asian studies scholar. His research interests include Confucianism, daily life in wartime Japan, and Asia-Pacific food studies, especially Japanese cuisine. He is the Henry E. Sheffield Professor of History at Pomona College in Claremont, California.

== Early life and education ==
Yamashita was born in 1946 in Honolulu, Hawaiʻi and raised in Kailua. He grew up in a household focused on baseball, which he has described as being "almost a religion in the Japanese American community". He attended high school at Mid-Pacific Institute, university at Macalester College, and subsequently received his Master's and doctorate degrees from the University of Michigan.

== Career ==
Yamashita began teaching at Pomona College in 1983. He retired on April 11, 2026 after over 40 years of teaching.

== Works ==
- Master Sorai's Responsals: An Annotated Translation of Sorai Sensei Tomonsho. University of Hawaiʻi Press. 1993. ISBN 978-0824815707.
- Leaves from an Autumn of Emergencies: Selections from the Wartime Diaries of Ordinary Japanese. University of Hawaiʻi Press. 2005. ISBN 978-0824829773.
- Daily Life in Wartime Japan, 1940–1945. University Press of Kansas. 2015. ISBN 9780700624621.
- Hawaiʻi Regional Cuisine: The Food Movement That Changed the Way Hawaiʻi Eats. University of Hawaiʻi Press. May 31, 2019. ISBN 9780824879723.
