= Anne Stevens =

American politician

Member of the Hawaii House of Representatives from the 23 district
- In office 2006–2006
- Preceded by: Galen Fox
- Succeeded by: Tom Brower

Personal details
- Party: Republican
- Profession: Politician

Anne Stevens is a former Republican member of the Hawaii House of Representatives. Stevens was appointed in January 2006 to replace Galen Fox as the representative for the State's 23rd district, which includes Waikiki and Ala Moana on the island of Oahu.

Stevens unsuccessfully ran for election to the 23rd District seat in 2006 and 2008. She remains active in her community as the Chairperson for the Waikiki Neighborhood Board.
