= Scott Nishimoto =

American politician

Member of the Honolulu City Council from the 5th district
- Incumbent
- Assumed office January 2, 2025
- Preceded by: Calvin Say

Member of the Hawaii House of Representatives
- In office November 5, 2002 – November 5, 2024
- Preceded by: Galen Fox
- Succeeded by: Ikaika Olds
- Constituency: 21st District (2002–2022); 23rd District (2022–2024)

Personal details
- Born: 1977 or 1978 (age 47–48)
- Party: Democratic
- Education: University of Hawaiʻi at Mānoa (BA, JD)
- Profession: attorney

Scott Yoshimi Nishimoto is an American politician serving as the member of the Honolulu City Council representing District V since January 2, 2025. He is a former Democratic member of the Hawaii House of Representatives from 2002 to 2024.

== Education ==
Nishimoto graduated from Mid-Pacific Institute. He earned his Bachelor of Arts in sociology from the University of Hawaiʻi at Mānoa in 1997 and his Juris Doctor from its William S. Richardson School of Law in 2002.

As an undergraduate student, Nishimoto was accepted to a fellowship with the DC-based nonprofit Congressional Asian Pacific American Caucus Institute, later called the Asian Pacific American Institute for Congressional Studies. During the one-year fellowship with U.S. Senator Daniel Inouye, he covered congressional hearings and compiled and distributed reports, sparking his interest in politics.

== Political career ==
=== Hawaii House of Representatives (2002–2024) ===
During his time as a state representative, Nishimoto had served as chairman of the House Legislative Management Committee and the House Judiciary Committee. As Judiciary Chair, Nishimoto helped push for the passage of House Bill 2071 which established the Law Enforcement Standards Board to regulate and investigate police officers. From 2023 to 2024, he also handled capital improvement projects appropriations for the House.

At the end of the 2024 legislative session, Nishimoto announced he would leave the House of Representatives to run for a seat on the Honolulu City Council.

== Elections ==
- 2002 When Republican Representative Galen Fox was redistricted to District 23, Nishimoto was unopposed for the open District 21 seat in the September 21, 2002 Democratic Primary, winning with 2,595 votes, and won the November 5, 2002 General election with 4,140 votes (52.2%) against Republican nominee Mindy Jaffe, who had sought a seat in 2000.
- 2004 Nishimoto was unopposed for the September 18, 2004 Democratic Primary, winning with 2,920 votes, Nishimoto won the November 2, 2004 General election with 6,689 votes (74.1%) against Republican nominee Gratia Bone.
- 2006 Nishimoto was unopposed for the September 26, 2006 Democratic Primary, winning with 3,775 votes, and won the November 7, 2006 General election with 5,249 votes (77.0%) against Republican nominee Mike Hu.
- 2008 Nishimoto was unopposed for both the September 20, 2008 Democratic Primary, winning with 2,796 votes, and the November 4, 2008 General election.
- 2010 Nishimoto was unopposed for the September 18, 2010 Democratic Primary, winning with 3,719 votes, and won the November 2, 2010 General election with 5,451 votes (72.5%) against Republican nominee Jay Lembeck.
- 2012 Nishimoto won the August 11, 2012 Democratic Primary with 3,031 votes (81.4%), and was unopposed for the November 6, 2012 General election.
