= Galen Fox =

American politician

Member of the Hawaii House of Representatives from the 23rd district
- In office 2003 – December 1, 2005
- Preceded by: Ed Case
- Succeeded by: Anne Stevens

Personal details
- Born: February 24, 1943 (age 83) Hilo, Hawaii
- Party: Republican
- Spouse: Sharon Moriwaki
- Education: University Laboratory School; Punahou School; University of Redlands (BA); Princeton University (PhD)
- Profession: Politician

Galen Fox (born February 24, 1943) is a former Hawaii State Representative of the Republican Party who resigned from the Hawaii legislature on December 1, 2005, after being convicted of misdemeanor sex abuse charges.

== Biography ==
Galen Fox was born in Hilo, Hawaii, raised in Honolulu, and educated at the University Laboratory School and at Punahou School. Fox received a Bachelor of Arts magna cum laude from the University of Redlands, a Ph.D. in Public Affairs from Princeton University, and was an International Affairs Fellow at the Council on Foreign Relations, New York City.

Fox was elected to Hawaii's State House in November 1996 as a representative of Hawaii's 23rd District, serving the Waikiki and Ala Moana district, and was re-elected in 2000, 2002, and 2004. He served as House Republican Leader and was also a member of the Finance, Labor and Transportation committee.

== Sex offense ==
On December 18, 2004, Fox was aboard United Airlines Flight 56 from Honolulu to Los Angeles. During the flight, Fox was seated next to an Asian female passenger. The woman later told investigators with the FBI that she had taken dramamine because she wanted to rest and fell asleep holding a folded airline blanket on her lap, her arms crossed over her blanket. Fox testified during his trial that after he placed his arm on the arm rest, the sleeping woman did not move her own arm from the arm rest. Later, he pressed his leg against hers. Fox claimed that he believed that because the sleeping woman did not move away, she was "giving him a nonverbal clue that she was sexually interested."

Fox then proceeded to unbutton and unzip the sleeping woman's jeans and placed his hand on her crotch. The woman awoke to find Fox fondling her and quickly confronted him. According to court transcripts, Fox apologized for touching her, then pretended to go to sleep. The woman promptly alerted her parents who sat across the aisle from her and then notified flight attendants, who moved them to other seats.

Police officers and FBI agents were waiting in Los Angeles when the flight arrived. Fox was arrested and, during an interview with Special Agent Rodney G. Fung of the FBI's Los Angeles International Airport Office, Fox denied rubbing the woman's crotch or unzipping her jeans. He admitted to reaching over to touch the woman, whom he described as an attractive Asian woman, and said that he should not have been touching her. According to Fung's affidavit, Fox "reiterated he was only reaching to touch her hand and could not explain why he wanted to touch her hand."

Fox was put on trial in the Central District of California on October 20, 2005. The trial was presided over by U.S. District Judge Margaret Nagle. During the trial, Fox admitted to Nagle that he had touched the woman's thigh and crotch during the flight. Fox also admitted that the woman did not react or make any sound when he was rubbing her thigh and her crotch area, and that she did not invite his conduct nor give him consent to touch her. According to court transcripts reported on by the Honolulu Star-Bulletin, Nagle asked if Fox intended to move his hand up along her thigh, for whatever purpose, and Fox answered, "yes."

Nagle then asked Fox: "And you did rub her crotch. That was an intentional act?" Fox's answer was again "yes."

Fox was found guilty of misdemeanor sexual battery and misdemeanor abusive sexual contact with another person without their consent.

Despite his admission in court and conviction, Fox denied that he had done anything wrong. According to news reports published in the Hawaii Reporter, Fox insisted that he was innocent. Fox told reporters, "I vigorously fought the charges against me, which I hold to be untrue." In addition, Fox told KITV he hoped his conviction would remain a secret so he could serve out his term in office. He also told KITV the same story he told the Hawaii Reporter: "In my heart I know I didn't do it."

Fox submitted his resignation from the Hawaii state legislature on November 1, 2005. His resignation became effective on December 1, 2005.

== Sentencing ==
On January 26, 2006, Fox appeared before Nagle for sentencing. According to the Hawaii Reporter, during the sentencing hearing, Fox stated that he had "hoped for romance with the young woman and had touched her leg and arm, taking her complete lack of response as consent." Fox also told Nagle that he was innocent, stating "I cannot admit to something that I did not do."

During the court hearing, Nagle read parts of a letter from the victim. "Since that flight, I have had difficulty sleeping and I have been having nightmares of Galen Fox," the victim wrote. "I brought this case because I had the right to sleep on a plane without being groped." Fox was sentenced by Nagle to three months of house arrest, three years probation and a $2,500 fine. He was also ordered to register as a sex offender and to take a psychiatric examination or sex offender treatment. Nagle stated that she imposed the house arrest sentence because Fox was a "defendant who is unable to admit that he is at fault in any way."

Hawaii House of Representatives
Preceded by Mary-Jane McMurdo	Member of the Hawaii House of Representatives from the 21st district 1997–2003	Succeeded by Scott Nishimoto
Preceded by Ed Case	Member of the Hawaii House of Representatives from the 23rd district 2003–2005	Succeeded by Anne Stevens
Preceded by Quentin Kawānanakoa	Minority Whip of the Hawaii House of Representatives; 1999–2001	Succeeded by Paul Whalen
Preceded by Barbara Marumoto	Minority Leader of the Hawaii House of Representatives; 2001–2005	Succeeded by Lynn Finnegan
