= Tom Brower =

American politician

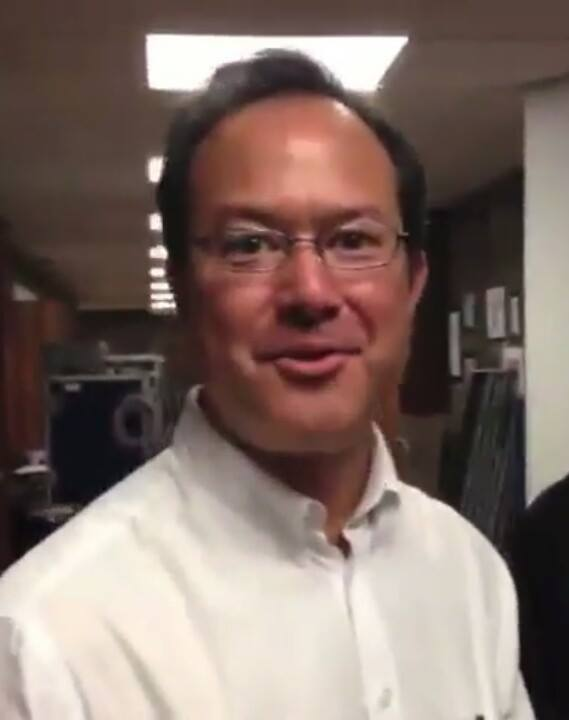

Member of the Hawaii House of Representatives from the 22nd district 23rd (2006–2012)
- In office November 7, 2006 – November 3, 2020
- Preceded by: Anne Stevens
- Succeeded by: Adrian Tam

Personal details
- Born: March 3, 1965 (age 61) Honolulu, Hawaii
- Party: Democratic
- Education: University of Hawaiʻi at Mānoa

Thomas M. Brower (born March 3, 1965) is an American politician. He was a Democratic House member of the Hawaii House of Representatives who represented the 22nd district— which includes Waikiki, Ala Moana and Kakaʻako on the island of Oahu. In his spare time he scours streets and parks in his district, looking for shopping carts homeless use to store and move their belongings. He returns good ones to stores and destroys others with his sledgehammer. In 2015 he was injured in another altercation at a homeless camp.

Brower was born at Kapiolani Medical Center in Honolulu, Hawaii. His father, who is Caucasian, worked as a police sergeant; his mother, a Japanese-American, a schoolteacher. He was raised in Belmar and Spring Lake, New Jersey where he attended elementary, middle and high school. He graduated from the University of Hawaiʻi at Mānoa with a bachelor of arts in journalism in 1989.
