= Elvira Manahan =

Filipino socialite (1927–1986)

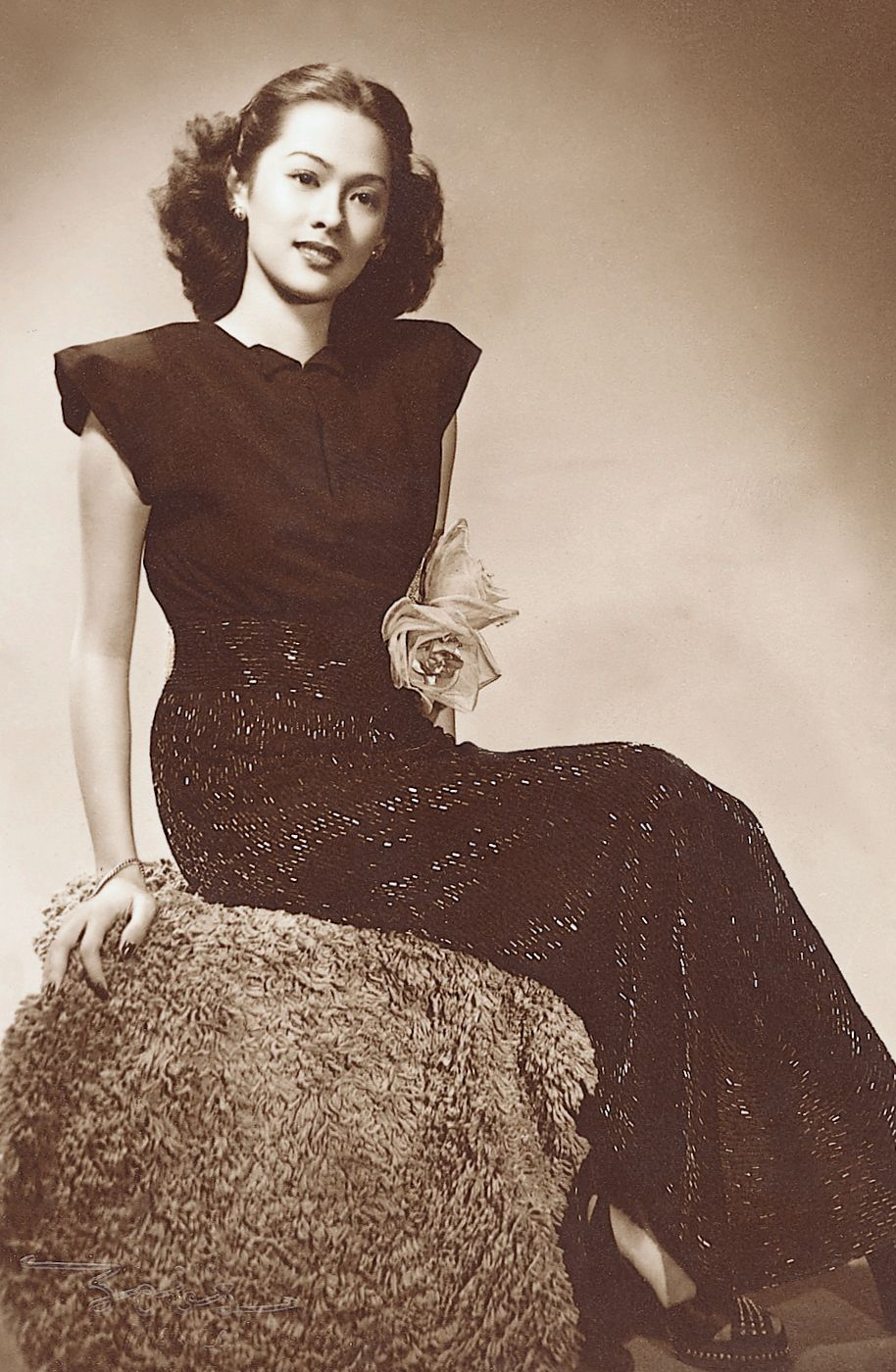
- Born: Isabel Bermejo Ledesma; 27 June 1927; Silay, Negros Occidental, Philippines
- Died: 14 October 1986 (aged 59); Forbes Park, Makati, Philippines
- Cause of death: Murder
- Citizenship: Philippines
- Occupation: television host
- Spouses: Armando Eduque (m. 1944; killed 1945) Constantino Manahan (m. 1945)
- Children: 4 (including Johnny)
- Relatives: Manuel Manahan (brother-in-law); Joey Manahan (grandson)

Elvira Bermejo Ledesma y Manahan (Tagalog: [ɛlˈbiː.ɾa maˈna.han]; 27 June 1927 – 14 October 1986) was a Filipino television host, actress and socialite. As an actress, she starred in '70s and '80s films such as Ang Pulubi (1969), Burgis (1981) and Bagong Hari (1986), and hosted in television shows Two for the Road (1967) and Family Kuarta o Kahon.

Tatler Asia described her as "a society and fashion icon whose reputation remains unrivalled". She was compared to Kim Novak, Bianca Jagger and Zsa Zsa Gabor for her beauty and glamorous lifestyle, and socialized with Hollywood celebrities Bob Hope, Sammy Davis Jr., Marlon Brando and Pat Boone.

In October 1986, she was brutally murdered by her real estate broker, which shocked the country and remains a talk of Philippine society.

== Biography ==
=== Early life ===
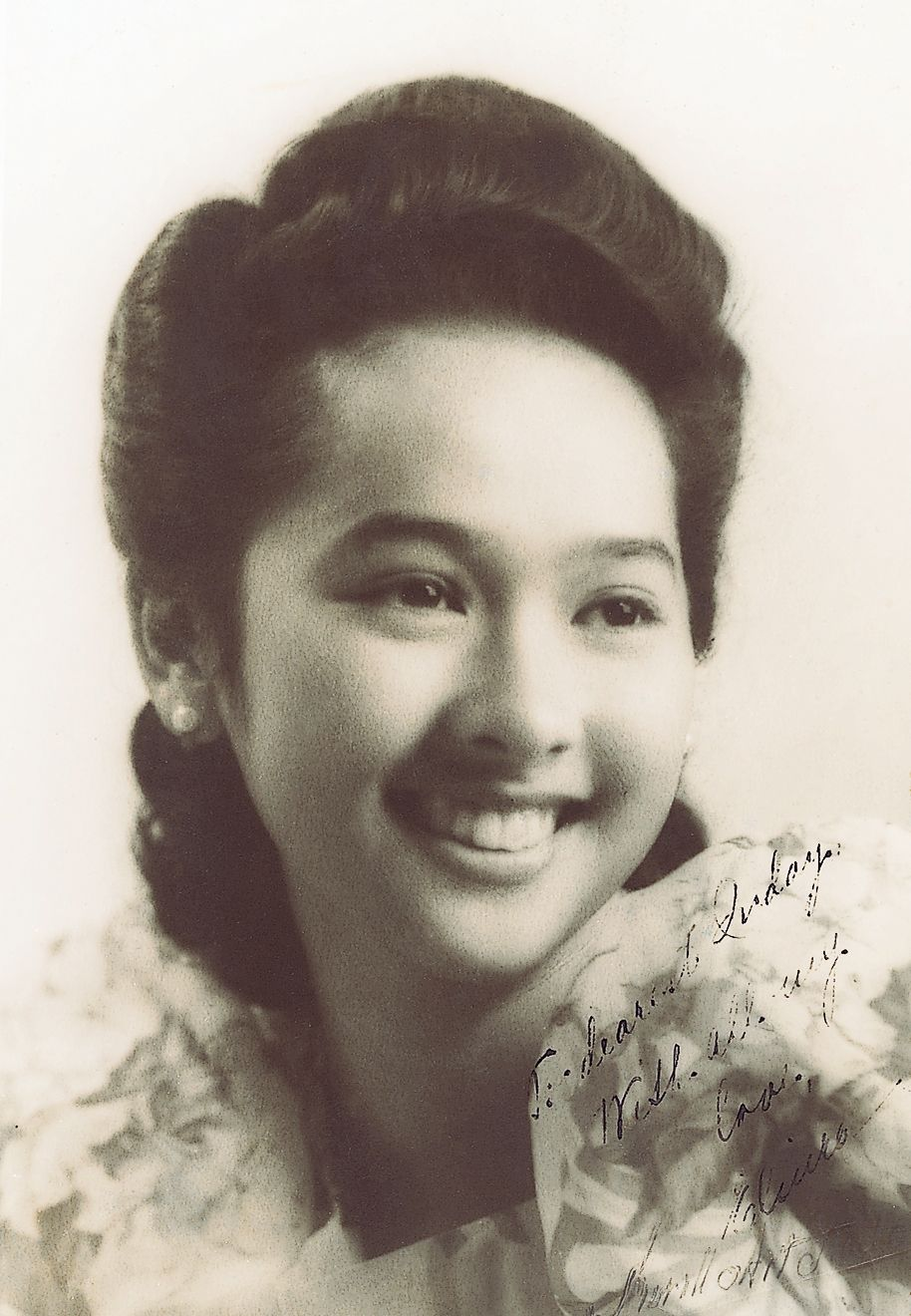
Elvira as a teenager.

Manahan was born 27 June 1927 in Silay, Negros Occidental to Simeon Ledesma and Conchita Bermejo. Just before she turned two years old, she was sent to study in Manila under the supervision of her paternal grandmother, Gertrudes Montinola Ledesma, and spinster aunts Pacita and Soledad Ledesma, which made her emotionally distant from her parents and her six siblings.

She studied at the College of the Holy Spirit Manila, where, according to the filmmaker Larry Henares Jr., boys from De La Salle University and Ateneo de Manila University would travel to just to have a "glimpse of her beauty and hear her very laughter".

=== Social life ===
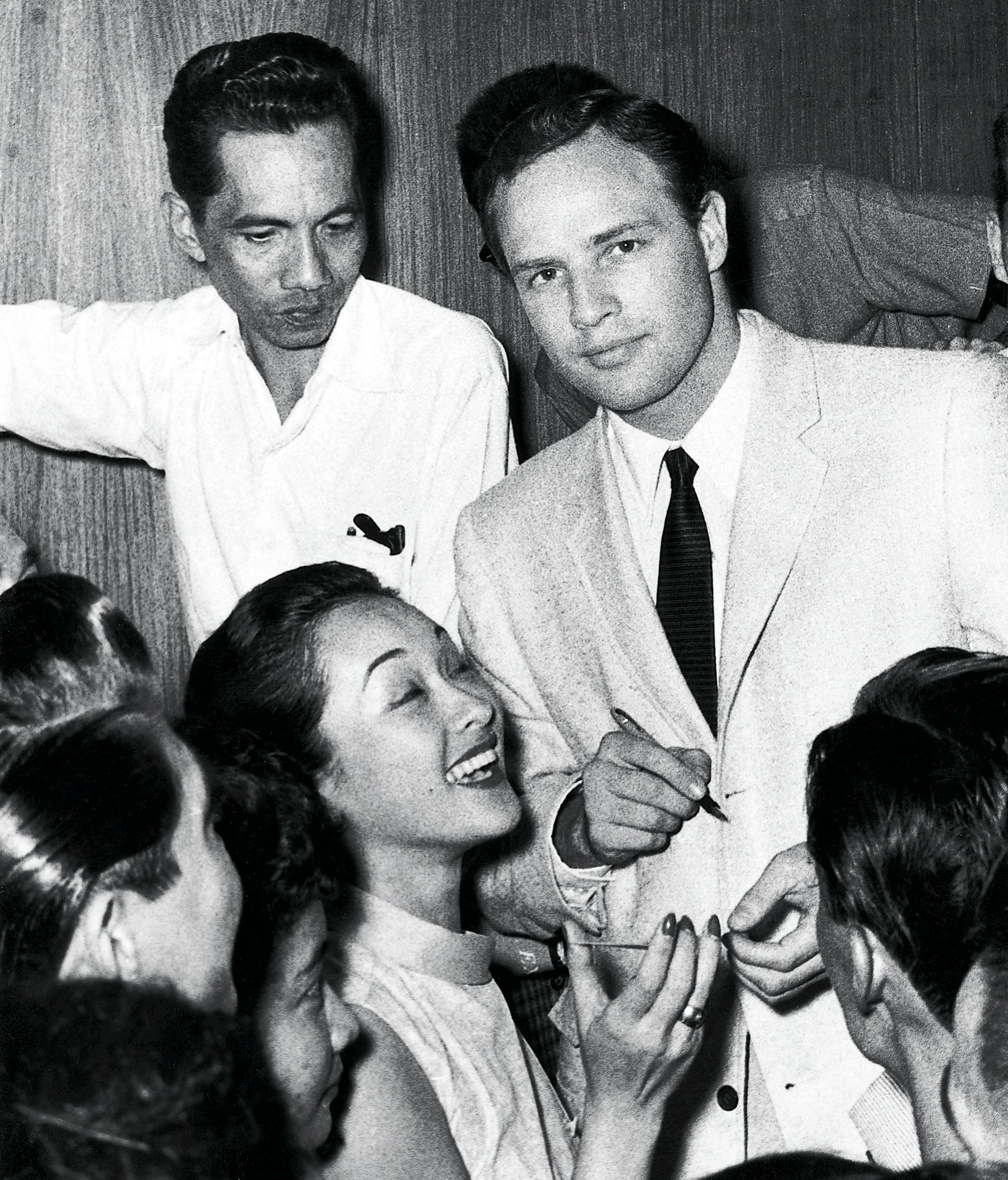
Elvira with Marlon Brando.

Her marriage to Dr. Constantino Manahan, brought her prominence in high society; spending significant amount of time attending fashionable events, galas, and parties, and was always "among the best dressed at charity balls". Her character caught the attention of media tycoon Eugenio Lopez Jr. whom invited her to work on television for a TV talk show Two for the Road, which she happily accepted. Directed by future co-host Nestor Torre Jr., Two For the Road aired on ABS-CBN Channel 3 (later 2 in November 1969) in 1967 first with co-host Joey Lardizabal, who was a regular host of The Morning Show and Stop, Look, & Listen, and a commentator of the Mexico Olympics with Penggoy Pingson in 1968. After Lardizabal's death in 1969, Eddie Mercado took over until 1972.

As a talk show pioneer, she made shows into something that people looked forward to that lasted until midnight. Columnist George Sison recalled that "people would watch [Manahan] for her jewelry and clothes", and Manahan chose clothes that were "telegenic".

As a television host, Manahan was known for her hilarious mistakes and unpredictable remarks. In one episode, she mistakenly introduced an Argentine ambassador as being from Chile and reacted when corrected, "Why, is Chile not in Argentina?", which made the ambassador laugh. In another episode, she introduced politician Joseph Estrada, then Mayor of San Juan, as the Mayor of Pasay City. She was not even discreet about her surgical enhancements, announcing live that she was going to be off for two weeks as she was about to have a facelift. In response to why she needed one, she responded "I have to be kind to the people who look at me. I owe it to my family and the people who watch me."

Unlike any socialites who led quiet lives, Manahan dared to engage in show business and venture in acting. In the 1970s and '80s, she starred in films Ang Pulubi (1969), Pagdating sa Dulo (1971), Alaga (1980), Burgis (1981), and Bagong Hari (1986). In Alaga, she played as the matron-benefactress of the young Edu Manzano.

== Personal life ==
=== Marriage and family ===
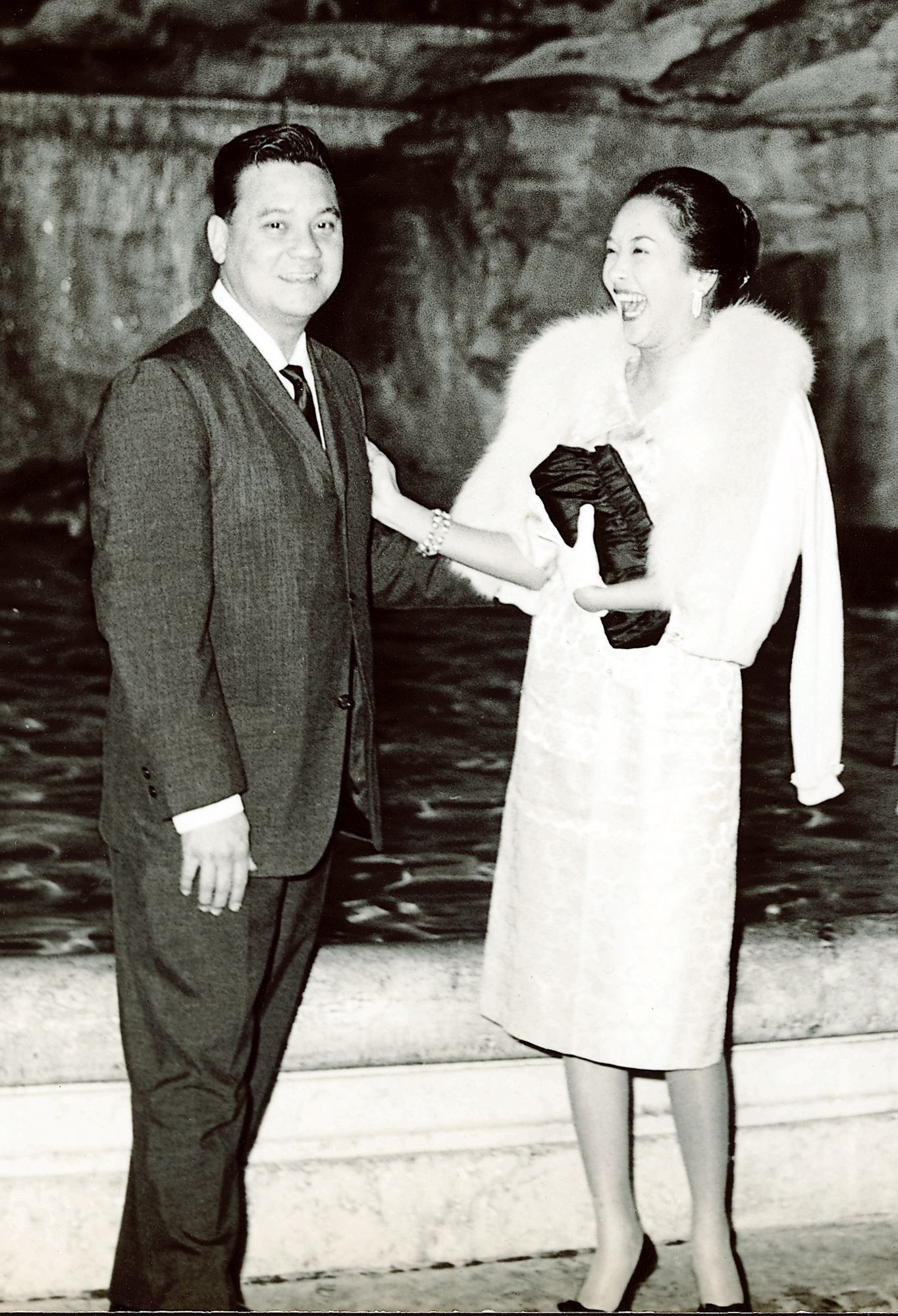
Dr. Constantino and Elvira in Rome, Italy.

Her grandson Joey Manahan was a member of the Hawaii House of Representatives (2007–2013) and ran in the 2014 election to represent Hawaii's 1st congressional district in the United States House of Representatives, but finished sixth in the Democratic primary held in August 2014.

=== Extramarital affairs ===
Before the declaration of Martial Law, Manahan had romantic relationships with Ali Aziz, a British-Arab financial consultant to the business magnate Aristotle Onassis and President Ferdinand Marcos. She began her affairs with Aziz due to her husband's busy career. Friends and colleagues of husband came to their defense including Jaime Zobel de Ayala who argued that he "was dedicated to his profession" that made him "one of the best obstetricians in Manila". Regardless, Manahan moved to London and lived with Aziz from 1972 to 1977. In 1977, after realizing her mistakes, she returned to the Philippines and reconciled with her husband and friends whom she shunned away during her affair.

=== Religion ===
Manahan was a practicing Roman Catholic, who donated to numerous charities and supported seminaries. When Mother Teresa visited Manila, Manahan sought to meet her and shared that she was estranged from her family for many years, and that she would like to work with the Missionaries of Charity to compensate for her absence. In response, Mother Teresa told her, "You stay home and take good care of your husband and children. Your role is in your home".

== Murder ==
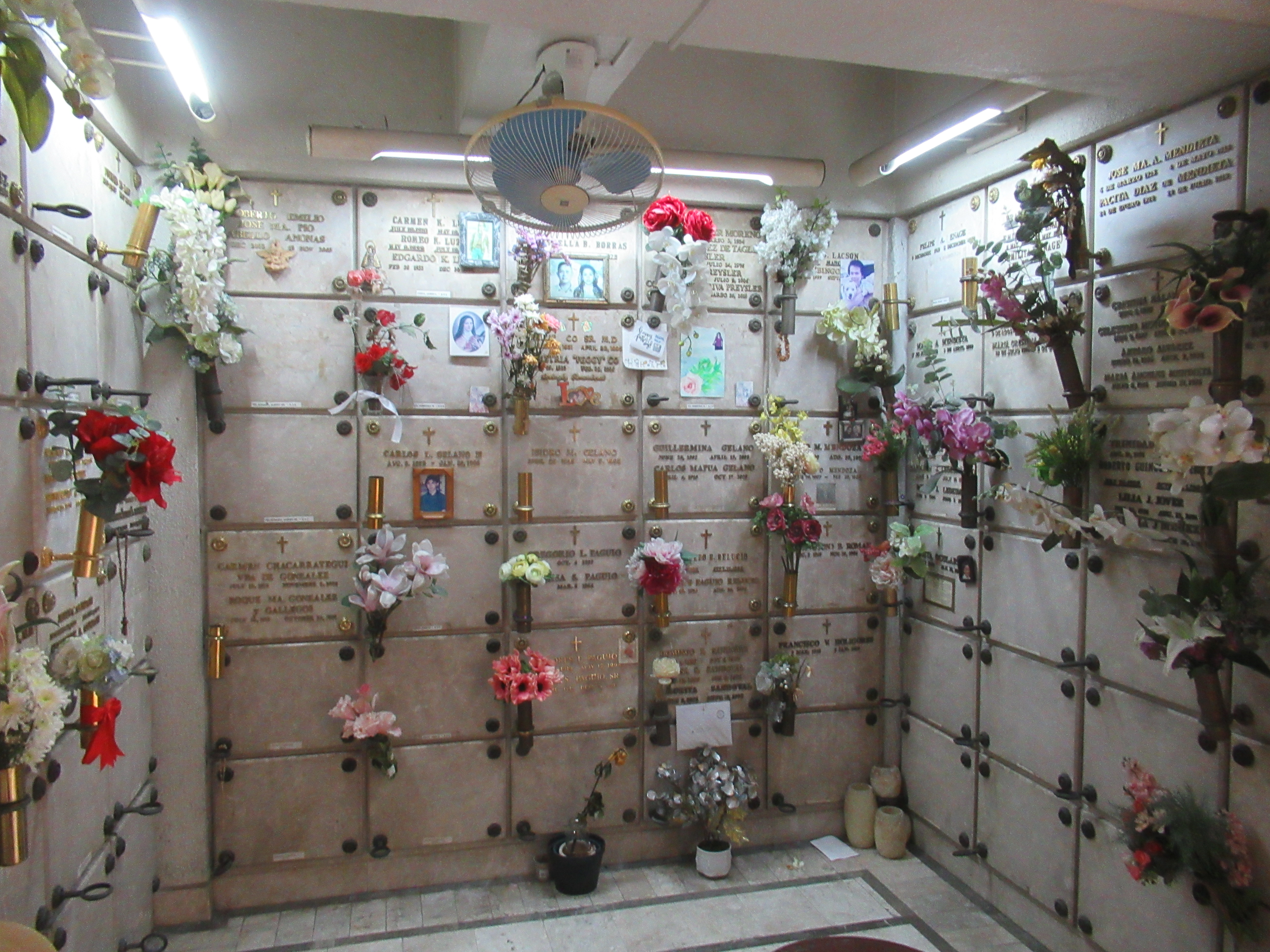
Elvira's remains are interred at the Santuario de San Antonio columbarium in Forbes Park, Makati.

On 14 October 1986, Jaime Balatbat, a 27-year-old negotiating the sale of the Manahan's Forbes Park home, entered the Manahan's residence in Forbes Park, Makati at 8 AM supposedly to get his commission from a real estate deal. A noticeably agitated Balatbat was welcomed and offered refreshments by a maid while he waited for Manahan, who was still asleep, when suddenly Balatbat shot the maid, killing her instantly, and short two other helpers as he moved around the house. One of the wounded maid was able to crawl out the gate and call the attention of a neighbor’s maid to notify village security. Due to the commotion, Manahan woke up and was confronted by a deranged Balatbat who demanded for money. After writing a check for an undisclosed amount, Balatbat clubbed her to death with 15-pound dumbbell and afterwards escaped. The victims were rushed to the Makati Medical Center and Manahan underwent brain surgery but died at 7 PM.

Prior to committing murder, Balatbat already had a criminal record, which included a near-fatal assault on a US embassy official. He was eventually captured and jailed, wherein a court case was brought up to the level of the Supreme Court. Two years later, Balatbat was killed while in police custody for allegedly attempting to escape during a prison fight. His motives for the crime have been tied to gambling debt and drug use, being at a casino the night prior.

Columnist George Sison noted that among Manahan's favorite expressions included "I need that like a hole in the head" and "When I die, I'd like to go with a bang!". Weeks before her death, Manahan also shared that she perceived Jaime Balatbat "to be mentally unstable" but continued trusting him. Sison also argued that there was never an affair between Manahan and Balatbat, saying, "One thing about Elvira is that she's a sucker for sob stories. She would talk to him on the phone for hours. There were even nasty rumours that he was her lover. I don't think so. You would not misconstrue that her reaction to him was attraction."
