= Radiant Cordero =

American politician

- Cordero in 2025

Member of the Honolulu City Council from the 7th district
- Incumbent
- Assumed office January 2, 2021
- Preceded by: Joey Manahan

Personal details
- Born: 1989 or 1990 (age 35–36) Honolulu, Hawaii, U.S.
- Party: Democratic
- Education: University of Hawaiʻi at Mānoa (BA, MPA)

Radiant Cordero is an American politician serving as a member of the Honolulu City Council, representing District VII. District VII encompasses parts of urban Honolulu, including Kalihi, Iwilei, Kalihi Kai, Māpunapuna, and Salt Lake. She assumed office on January 2, 2021.

== Early life and education ==
Cordero grew up in Kalihi Kai, a neighborhood of Honolulu, and graduated from Mid-Pacific Institute. She attended the University of Hawaiʻi at Mānoa, where she earned a bachelor's degree in Political Science and American Studies and a Master of Public Administration degree in 2016.

Prior to entering elected office, she worked in media as a radio host and as an associate editor, writer and columnist for the Fil-Am Courier, a long-running publication for the local Filipino community which was founded by her mother and aunt.

== Career ==
Cordero served as chief of staff to Honolulu City Councilmember Joey Manahan for Council District VII. Before her run for office, she worked for Manahan for over a decade, including as his legislative aide when Manahan served in the Hawaii House of Representatives.

When Manahan was term-limited in 2020, Cordero ran for the open District VII seat. In the August 8, 2020 nonpartisan primary election, Cordero placed first with 47.5% of the vote (7,258 votes), advancing to the general election alongside Jacob Aki. In the general election on November 3, 2020, she defeated Aki, receiving 52.9% of the vote (12,730 votes). She took office on January 2, 2021.

During her tenure on the council, Cordero has served as Council Floor Leader and chaired the Committee on Transportation, Sustainability and Health. In the 2024 elections, Cordero ran for re-election to District 7. Running unopposed in the primary election on August 10, 2024, she secured 100% of the vote (9,849 votes) and won re-election outright, canceling the need for a general election contest.

== Personal life ==
Cordero is married. Her husband works as a mechanic for the U.S. Navy.
