= Honolulu City Council =

City council in Honolulu, Hawaii

Type
- Type: Unicameral
- Term limits: Two consecutive four-year terms

Leadership
- Council Chair: Tyler Dos Santos-Tam
- Vice-Chair: Esther Kiaʻāina
- Floor Leader: Scott Nishimoto

Structure
- Seats: 9
- Length of term: 4 years
- Authority: Section 3-101, Revised Charter of Honolulu
- Salary: $138,264 Council Chair $127,800 (2026)

Elections
- Voting system: Single-member district
- Last election: November 5, 2024
- Next election: November 3, 2026

Meeting place
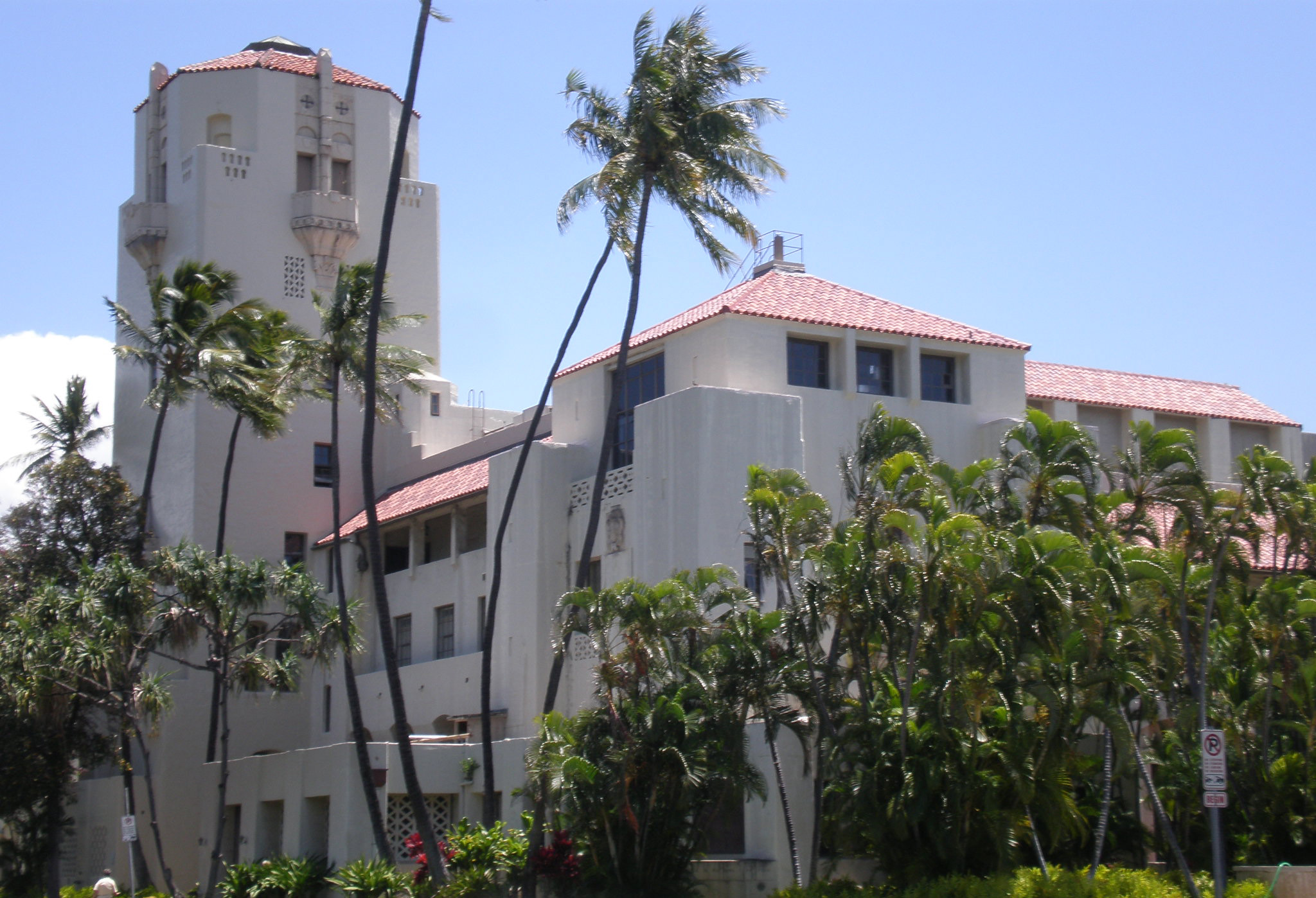
- Honolulu Hale, Honolulu

Website
- https://www.honolulucitycouncil.org/

Honolulu City Council is the legislature of the City and County of Honolulu, the capital and largest city in Hawai'i, the fiftieth state in the United States. The City and County of Honolulu is a municipal corporation that manages government aspects traditionally exercised by both municipalities and counties in other states. Each of the nine members of its city council is elected to a four-year term and can serve no more than two consecutive terms. Council members are elected by voters in nine administrative districts that, since 1991, are reapportioned every ten years. Like the Honolulu mayor, members of the city council are elected via nonpartisan elections.

Enacted in 1973, the City and County Charter establishes the council's legislative power and responsibility for Honolulu County, including its budget, public safety, zoning and municipal development, and other governmental affairs.

== History ==
Honolulu's first legislative body was the Board of Supervisors of Oʻahu County, established by the Legislature of the Territory of Hawaiʻi via the County Act of 1905. The mayor-council system of municipal government was created when the consolidated city-county of Honolulu was established in the city charter adopted by the 1907 territorial legislature. Unlike the current nine-member city council, the original board included seven elected at-large supervisors led by the Mayor of Honolulu.

The board of supervisors was renamed the Honolulu City Council in 1955. In 1959, the same year in which Hawaiʻi became a U.S. state, the city and county adopted a new charter that reapportioned three seats of the council from at-large to specific rural districts. Changes to the charter in 1973 required all council districts to elect its council members, and set rules for electing the council president and filling vacancies.

A 1992 charter amendment limited council members to no more than two consecutive terms, and required council seats to be nonpartisan. It also established the rule of "decennial reapportionment," which requires the council to appoint a commission to review and reapportion council districts every ten years.

Another charter amendment, adopted in 1998, staggered council member terms, with four of the nine members elected in one election, and the remaining five in the next. Beginning in 2002, an appointed city auditor became responsible for city government accountability.

== Composition ==
The city council has nine members, each of whom was elected by one of nine council districts that represent the City and County of Honolulu and encompass the entire Island of Oahu. The 2020 reapportionment established the current council districts.

== Elections ==
The State of Hawaiʻi Office of Elections holds elections of council members during the state's general election period. Members are elected in nonpartisan primary elections held in August. If no candidate wins a majority of the primary vote, the top two face off in November. Every council member must be a qualified elector in the council district from which they are elected or appointed.

== Removal ==
A member will be removed from office if they move from their district during their term or are impeached via a recall petition signed by a minimum of 10 percent of the registered voters in their district.

== Leadership ==
Members of the City Council elect a chair and vice-chair. The chair serves as speaker, presides over council meetings, and, with the council's approval, performs ministerial functions such as appointing members of the Charter Commission. The council vice-chair serves as presiding officer only when the chair is absent or otherwise cannot serve. The elections are formally nonpartisan, with the party affiliations below reflecting known political history, candidate self-declaration, or state party support.

Councilmembers
District	Councilmember	Party	Current Term Ends
1 (Note: District I: Portions of ʻEwa Beach, Kapolei, Ho‘opili, Makakilo, Kalaeloa, Honokai Hale, Ko ‘Olina, Nānākuli, Mā‘ili, Wai‘anae, Mākaha, Kea‘au, and Mākua)	Andria Tupola	Republican	2029
2 (Note: District II: Waikele, Village Park, Royal Kunia, Launani Valley, Wahiawā, Whitmore Village, Mokulē‘ia, Waialua, Hale‘iwa, Waimea, Pūpūkea, Sunset Beach, Waialeʻe, Kahuku, Lā‘ie, Hau‘ula, Punalu‘u, Kahana, Ka‘a‘awa, Kualoa, Waiāhole, and Kahalu‘u)	Matt Weyer	Democratic	2027
3 (Note: District III: ‘Āhuimanu, He‘eia, Ha‘ikū, Kāne‘ohe, Maunawili, Kailua, Olomana, Enchanted Lake, and Waimānalo)	Esther Kiaʻāina, Vice Chair	Democratic	2029
4 (Note: District IV: Hawai‘i Kai, Kuli‘ou‘ou, Niu Valley, ‘Āina Haina, Wailupe, Wai‘alae Iki, Kalani Valley, Kāhala, Wilhemina Rise, Kaimukī, Kapahulu, Diamond Head, and Waikīkī)	Tommy Waters	Democratic	2027
5 (Note: District V: Palolo Valley, St. Louis Heights, Mānoa, Mōʻiliʻili, McCully, Ala Moana, Makiki, and portions of Kakaʻako)	Scott Nishimoto, Floor Leader	Democratic	2029
6 (Note: District VI: Portions of Kakaʻako, Downtown Honolulu, Punchbowl, Papakolea, Pauoa Valley, Nu‘uanu, Iwilei, Liliha, ‘Ālewa Heights, Kalihi and Kalihi Valley)	Tyler Dos Santos-Tam, Chair	Democratic	2027
7 (Note: District VII: Kalihi Kai, Māpunapuna, Fort Shafter, Moanalua, Salt Lake, Airport, Hickam, Āliamanu, Foster Village, Pearl Harbor, Hālawa, ‘Aiea, Pearlridge, Mokuʻumeʻume, and Sand Island)	Radiant Cordero	Democratic	2029
8 (Note: District VIII: Portions of ‘Aiea, Waimalu, Newtown, Pearl City, Seaview, Crestview, Waipi‘o Gentry, Koa Ridge, Mililani Town, and Mililani Mauka)	Val Okimoto	Republican	2027
9 (Note: District IX: Waipahū, Iroquois Point, West Loch, ʻEwa Villages and portions of ʻEwa Beach)	Augie Tulba	Republican	2029

== Legislative power ==
The Constitution of the State of Hawaiʻi gives each county the power to “frame and adopt a charter for its own self-government.” The consolidated City and County of Honolulu spans the entire Island of Oahu. Its city council exercises the legislative power of the county government. The county charter grants some executive power to the council: setting real property tax rates; setting, controlling, and auditing the county budget, and; establishing county agencies and commissions. Although it lacks the power to directly amend the charter, the council selects six of the 13-member Charter Commission, the agency that conducts the mandatory review of the city charter for each ten-year period.

Both the Honolulu mayor and city council members may introduce a "Bill for an Ordinance" for inclusion into the Revised Ordinances of Honolulu, the set of laws governing the county. By law, voters have a limited initiative power to propose bills unrelated to the repeal of taxes, appropriation of money, and other financial activities.

=== Legislative process ===
The city council presents a bill during the first reading, and refers it to the appropriate committees for review. Upon approval by the assigned committees, the bill is returned to the council for a second reading. After the second reading, the bill is published in a newspaper; thereafter, a public hearing on the bill is held. Following public comment, the council sends the bill back to the committees for further revision, and, following their approval, sets the bill for its third and final reading. A bill that passes third reading is sent to the Honolulu mayor. The mayor must either approve or veto the bill, which becomes law only after the mayor approves it.

=== Investigation and audit powers ===
The city council has the power to investigate the operations of city agencies and any subjects over which the council exercises legislative control. Given its setting of the city's budget and oversight of its financial activities, the council can order audits of county departments and agencies.

=== Appointment powers ===
The council appoints the city clerk, auditor, and the director of council services. With the mayor's consent, it can also create and appoint officers of semi-autonomous agencies. The city currently oversees two semi-autonomous agencies: the Honolulu Board of Water Supply (BWS) and Honolulu Authority for Rapid Transportation (HART).

== Agencies and committees ==
As the legislative branch of the City and County of Honolulu, the city council supervises three offices, two semi-autonomous agencies, and nine committees.

=== Offices ===
- City Clerk's Office
- Office of Council Services
- Office of the City Auditor

=== Semi-autonomous agencies ===
- The Board of Water Supply
- Honolulu Authority for Rapid Transportation (HART)

=== Committees ===
Acronyms	Committee
BUD	Committee on Budget
ZON	Committee on Zoning & Planning
ITT	Committee on Infrastructure, Transportation & Technology
EES	Committee on Energy, Environment & Sustainability
PS	Committee on Public Safety & Economy
GCS	Committee on Government Efficiency & Customer Service
ILA	Committee on International & Legal Affairs
HHP	Committee on Housing, Homelessness & Parks
EM	Committee on Executive Management

== Resources ==
City and County of Honolulu Municipal Reference Center. http://www.honolulu.gov/cms-csd-menu/site-csd-sitearticles/18864-municipal-reference-center-resources-online.html

Dye, Bob. Hawaiʹi Chronicles II : Contemporary Island History from the Pages of Honolulu Magazine. Honolulu: University of Hawaiʹi Press, 1998.

Honolulu, Mayor's Office of Information and Complaint. The City and County of Honolulu. Honolulu, 1971.
