= List of Hawaii politicians =

Below is a List of Hawaiʻi politicians from the monarchical, republican, territorial, and statehood eras of history who have articles devoted to them on Wikipedia. Also listed are politicians who were born and raised in Hawaiʻi but have assumed political roles in other states or countries.

== A ==
- Neil Abercrombie, US Congress
- Duke Aiona, lt. governor, judge
- Bernard Akana, mayor of Hawaii County
- Daniel Akaka, US senator
- D. G. Anderson, party chair
- Eileen Anderson, mayor of Honolulu
- James Apana, mayor of Maui
- Alan Arakawa, mayor of Maui
- George R. Ariyoshi, governor, lt. governor
- Charles N. Arnold, mayor of Honolulu

== B ==
- Duke Bainum, city council member
- Henry Alexander Baldwin, US Congress delegate
- Bryan J. Baptiste, mayor of Kauai
- Della Au Belatti, state representative
- Hiram Bingham III, Connecticut governor, US senator
- Hiram Bingham IV, US vice consul to France
- Neal Shaw Blaisdell, mayor of Honolulu
- James Henderson Blount, US Minister to Hawai'i
- Keiko Bonk, county council member
- Robert Bunda, senate president
- John A. Burns, US Congress delegate, governor

== C ==
- Romeo Munoz Cachola, city council member
- George R. Carter, governor
- Edward Espenett Case, US Congress
- Campbell Cavasso, legislator
- Benjamin J. Cayetano, governor, lt. governor
- Charles Spencer Crane, mayor of Honolulu
- Elmer F. Cravalho, mayor of Maui

== D ==
- Sanford Ballard Dole, chief justice, governor, overthrow conspirator, president of the republic
- John Owen Dominis, prince consort, royal governor

== F ==
- Elizabeth Pruett Farrington, US Congress delegate
- Joseph Rider Farrington, US Congress delegate
- Wallace Rider Farrington, governor, mayor of Honolulu
- Frank Francis Fasi, mayor of Honolulu
- Joseph J. Fern, mayor of Honolulu
- Lynn Finnegan, state representative
- Hiram L. Fong, US senator
- Galen Fox, state representative and convicted sex offender
- Walter F. Frear, governor

== G ==
- Gerald Michael Gabbard, city council leader
- Tulsi Gabbard, US Congress
- Brickwood Galuteria, party chair
- Thomas P. Gill, US Congress, lt. governor

== H ==
- Mufi Hannemann, mayor of Honolulu
- Jeremy Harris, mayor of Honolulu
- Cecil Heftel, US Congress
- Mazie Hirono, lt. governor, US Congress
- Victor Stewart Kaleoaloha Houston, US Congress delegate
- Natalia Hussey-Burdick, state representative

== I ==
- Daniel Inouye, US Congress, US senator
- Virginia Isbell, Hawaii County Council Member
- Kim Coco Iwamoto, Board of Education member

== J ==
- William P. Jarrett, US Congress delegate
- Gerrit P. Judd, Kingdom cabinet minister
- Lawrence M. Judd, governor

== K ==
- Kaʻahumanu, queen regent, Kuhina Nui
- David Kalakaua, king
- Jonah Kuhio Kalanianaole, prince, US Congress delegate
- Kamehameha I, king
- Kamehameha II, king
- Kamehameha III, king
- Kamehameha IV, king
- Kamehameha V, king
- Ruth Keʻelikōlani, princess, royal governor
- Harry Kim, mayor of Hawaii County
- Samuel Wilder King, US Congress delegate, governor
- Eric Alfred Knudsen, Speaker of Hawaii House of Representatives
- John Adams Kuakini, governor of Hawaiʻi island
- Maryanne W. Kusaka, mayor of Kauai

== L ==
- John Carey Lane, mayor of Honolulu
- Lili'uokalani, queen
- Linda Lingle, governor, mayor of Maui, party chair
- Oren E. Long, governor, US senator
- William C. Lunalilo, king

== M ==
- Lincoln Loy McCandless, US Congress delegate
- Charles J. McCarthy, governor
- Eduardo Malapit, mayor of Kauai
- Barbara Marshall, city council member
- Herbert T. Matayoshi, mayor of Hawaiʻi County
- Spark M. Matsunaga, US Congress, US senator
- Patsy Mink, US Congress

== N ==
- Emily I. Naeole, Hawaiʻi county council member
- Joseph Nawahi, Kingdom legislature and Minister of Foreign Affairs

== O ==
- Barack Obama, 44th president of the United States

== P ==
- Lester Petrie, mayor of Honolulu
- Lucius E. Pinkham, governor
- Joseph B. Poindexter, governor

== Q ==
- William F. Quinn, governor

== R ==
- Sean Reyes, Utah attorney general

== S ==
- Patricia F. Saiki, US Congress
- Lehua Fernandes Salling, Hawaii Senate
- Calvin Say, house speaker
- Brian Schatz, representative, Hawaii House of Representatives
- Ingram M. Stainback, governor
- John L. Stevens, US Minister to Hawaii, overthrow conspirator

== T ==
- Hannibal Tavares, mayor of Maui
- Lorrin A. Thurston, overthrow conspirator, founder of the republic
- Wilfred Tsukiyama, Territorial Senator

== W ==
- John D. Waiheʻe III, governor, lt. governor
- Robert William Wilcox, US Congress delegate
- Albert Sydney Willis, US Minister to Hawaii
- John Henry Wilson, mayor of Honolulu
- George Frederick Wright, mayor of Honolulu
- Robert C. Wyllie, Minister of Foreign Affairs

== Y ==
- Stephen K. Yamashiro, mayor of Hawaii County
- John Young, governor of Hawaiʻi island
