= Spouses of the mayors of Honolulu =

Ceremonial position in Honolulu

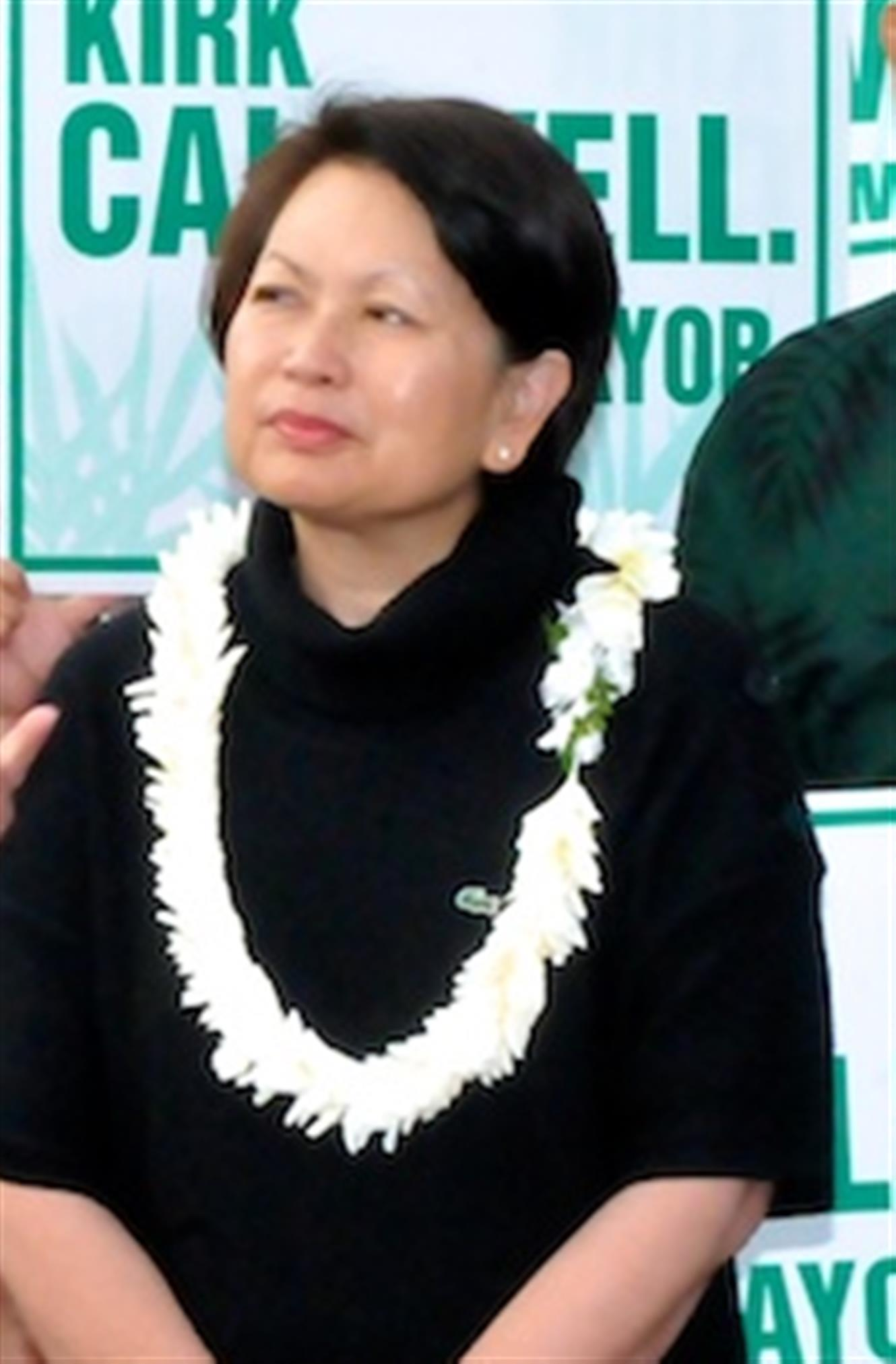
Donna Tanoue, spouse of Honolulu Mayor Kirk Caldwell

The spouse of the mayor of Honolulu is an unpaid ceremonial position. Those who have filled the position have been a reflection of the history of the islands. Several were of Hawaiian ancestry. Emma Fern was a Hawaiian chanter and dancer. Kini Kapahu Wilson was not only a proponent of women's voting suffrage, but also found fame as a hula dancer who performed for heads of state around the world.

Where Hawaiian ancestry was involved, including the cultural tradition of informal adoption known as hānai, some of the spouses were known by more than one name in addition to their married names. The practice itself, sometimes described as the Hawaiian foster care system, blurs the accuracy of how many children in a family are the issue of either parent, or fostered into the family. For that reason, obituaries often varied from source to source in reporting the number of children of the deceased.

So far, Eileen Anderson has been the only woman mayor, and her husband Clifford F. Anderson was retired from his position as an officer with the Honolulu Police Department when she ran for office. Mayor Frank Fasi married Cherry Blossom Queen contestant Joyce Kono. Lucy Thurston Blaisdell was a school teacher for decades, and Gail Mukaihata Hanneman served as a United States congressional staffer or years, before returning to Hawaii when her husband ran for mayor. Donna Tanoue has a background in financial investment, has served on several corporate boards, and earned her J.D. from the Georgetown University Law Center.

== Spouses of the mayors of Honolulu ==
Name	Image	Birth–Death	Term	Mayor	Notes	Ref(s)
Sheba Alapai Fern		(1872−1910)	1909–1910	Joseph J. Fern	They married in 1894. Mother of sixteen children, she was his second wife. She died April 1910.	
Emma Fern		(1872–1937)	1910–1915; 1917–1920	Joseph J. Fern	Joseph Fern served two non-consecutive terms as Mayor, and had 17 children by his first two wives. Hawaiian chanter and dancer Emma Keliikekukahilikaleleokalahikiolaokalani Smith Silva (or Sylva) became Mayor Fern's third wife on August 15, 1910. She had 9 children of her own, and together they had one child, Victoria Kukahilihiapoaliilani. They were then parents and/or step parents of their combined 27 children. He died during his second term in office, and she survived him by 17 years, dying on September 24, 1937. Her obituary gave her name as Emma K. Hiram Fern.	
Alice Kia Nāhaolelua Lane		(1889–1959)	1915–1917	John C. Lane	Known by several names. She was the daughter of the hānai (informally adopted) son of Governor of Maui Paul Nahaolelua. The wedding announcement referred to her as Alice Nahaolelua. Her obituary refers to her as Alice Kalakini Lane. Her mother was a lady-in-waiting to Queen Liliuokalani, who mentioned her in her book as "Mrs. Kia Nahaolelua". Alice's mother accompanied the queen to Washington D. C.	
Kini Kapahu Wilson		(1872–1962)	1920–1927; 1929–1931; 1947–1955	John H. Wilson	Wilson served three non-consecutive terms as Mayor. Kini Wilson was a hula dancer during the reign of Kalākaua, a suffragist, and named by Hawaii Magazine as one of "15 extraordinary Hawaii women who inspire us all" She toured the world, performed for Kaiser Wilhelm II and Tsar Nicholas II	
Julia Kaanaana Arnold		(1889–1967)	1927–1929	Charles N. Arnold	Julia was Mayor Arnold's second wife. He had 6 children with Charlotte K. Taylor who died in 1916. Children by that marriage were Charles Jr., Alfred, William, Cecelia, George and Arthur. In 1918, he married Julia Kaanaana Colburn, daughter of John F. Colburn and Julia Naoho. Together, they also had 6 children - Shaster, June, Alice, Evonne, Frances and Thomas.	
May Martha Lycett		(1885–1978)	1931–1938	George F. Wright	Born in Honolulu. Married September 11, 1905. Her mother's name was Annie, and her father James Lycett emigrated from Australia in 1876, employed by the Honolulu Iron Works. Her father's 1917 obituary lists his 11 living children; besides May, there was John, Sarah, Emma, Maud, Edith, Alice, William, Ada, Florence and Bertha.	
Vacant			1938–1941	Charles Crane	Hazel Jennings Crane died in 1918	
Mary Kamala Crewes Petrie		(1885–1971)	1941–1947	Lester Petrie	Born in Lahaina, she was the daughter of an English immigrant. Married in 1912, their children were Ramona, Wesley and Irma. She had membership in the Daughters of Hawaii. Named "Hawaii's Senior Citizen of 1965".	
Lucy Thurston Blaisdell		(1903–1986)	1955–1969	Neal Blaisdell	Born in Honolulu to Helen A. Meek and Charles Henry Thurston, she attended Punahou School. Lucy met her husband when she was in high school, and taught school for 36 years. The couple had two daughters, Velma and Marilyn. She christened the SS Matsonia in 1957.	
Joyce Miyeku Kono Fasi		(born 1937)	1969–1981; 1985–1994	Frank Fasi	Frank Fasi served two non-consecutive terms as Mayor. Joyce Fasi graduated from the University of Hawaii, and was stepmother to Fasi's children from a previous marriage. She was runner-up in the 1957 Cherry Blossom Queen contest.	
Clifford F. Anderson		—	1981–1985	Eileen Anderson	At the time of her election, her husband Clifford F. Anderson had retired from the Honolulu Police Department. They are the parents of three children.	
Ramona Sachiko Akui		—	1994–2004	Jeremy Harris	Ramona and Jeremy divorced in 2008	
Gail Mukaihata		—	2005–2010	Mufi Hannemann	Former US Congressional staff member, she served on the American Samoa Economic Advisory Commission, and has been a director of the Hawaii Medical Assurance Association.	
Judy Carlisle		—	2010–2013	Peter Carlisle	Cat lover	
Donna Tanoue		(born 1954)	2013–2021	Kirk Caldwell	Tanoue has a financial investment background. She was the 17th chairperson of the U.S. Federal Deposit Insurance Corporation (FDIC) from May 26, 1998, until July 11, 2001. Subsequently, in April 2002, she became Vice chairperson and Managing Committee member of the Bank of Hawaii. She holds a J.D. from the Georgetown University Law Center.	
Karen Chang		—	2021–present	Rick Blangiardi	Chang has worked with American Express marketing, Charles Schwab's business scope, and as board chair of Hawaii Pacific Health. During the COVID-19 pandemic, she founded The Creative City, a project to promote culture and the arts on Oahu.	

== See also ==
- Spouses of the Governors of Hawaii

== Bibliography ==
- Leavitt, Judith A. (1985). American women managers and administrators : a selective biographical dictionary of twentieth-century leaders in business, education, and government (1. publ. ed.). Westport, Conn.: Greenwood Pressl. ISBN 0-313-23748-4.
- Liliuokalani, Queen (1898). Hawaii's story by Hawaii's Queen, Liliuokalani. Boston, MA: Lee & Shepard – via HathiTrust.
