= Asing =

Asing is a surname. Notable people with the surname include:

- Kaipo Asing (born 1930 or 1931), American politician
- Keanu Asing (born 1993), American surfer
