= Tanoue =

Tanoue (written: 田上 or 田ノ上 lit. "on the field") is a Japanese surname. Notable people with the surname include:

- Donna Tanoue (born 1954), American lawyer
- Hidenori Tanoue (田上 秀則, born 1980), Japanese baseball player
- Shinya Tanoue (田ノ上 信也, born 1980), Japanese footballer
- Takashi Tanoue (田上 高, 1947–2009), Japanese sport wrestler

== See also ==
- Taue
