= Taue =

Taue (written: 田上) is a Japanese surname. Notable people with the surname include

- Akira Taue (田上 明, born 1961), Japanese professional wrestler
- Tomihisa Taue (田上 富久, born 1956), Japanese politician

== See also ==
- Taue, Kagoshima, a town in Kagoshima Prefecture, Japan
- Tanoue
