= Mayor of Kauai =

Executive officer of Kauai County, Hawaii

- Incumbent; Derek Kawakami since December 3, 2018
- Inaugural holder: Antone Vidinha
- Formation: 1969

The mayor of Kauai is the chief executive officer of the Kauai County in the state of Hawaii. The mayor has municipal jurisdiction over the islands of Kauaʻi and Niʻihau. Derek Kawakami was elected on November 6, 2018, as the mayor of Kauai over JoAnn Yukimura, who was Kauai's mayor from 1988 to 1992, with 15,857 votes out of 40,323 registered voters in the County of Kauai. The mayor of Kauai is the successor of the Royal Governors of Kauai of the Kingdom of Hawaii.

Bryan J. Baptiste served as Mayor of Kaui from 2002 until his death on June 22, 2008. Bill "Kaipo" Asing was sworn as acting mayor on July 17, 2008, until a special election could be held to fill the remaining two years of Baptiste's term.

Bernard Carvalho was elected on November 4, 2008, to complete the remaining two years of Baptiste's unexpired term.

== List of mayors of Kauai ==
Mayor	Term begins	Term ends	Notes
Antone Vidinha	1969	1972	First mayor of Kauai; served two consecutive terms (1969-1970, 1971-1972). Defeated for re-election in 1972.
Francis M. F. Ching	1972	1974	
Eduardo Malapit	1974	1982	
Tony Kunimura	1982	1988	Defeated for re-election in the 1988 mayoral primary by JoAnn Yukimura.
JoAnn Yukimura	1988	December 1994	First female mayor of Kauai. Defeated by Maryanne Kusaka in the 1994 general election.
Maryanne Kusaka	December 1994	December 2, 2002	
Bryan Baptiste	December 2, 2002	June 22, 2008	Died in office on June 22, 2008
Gary Heu	June 22, 2008	July 17, 2008	Heu was the late Mayor Baptiste's administrative assistant. He served as acting mayor from Baptiste's death until Asing was sworn in as interim mayor on July 17, 2008.
Kaipo Asing	July 17, 2008	December 1, 2008	Elected interim mayor by the Kauai County Council until the special election to fill the remainder of Baptiste's unexpired term.
Bernard Carvalho	December 1, 2008	December 3, 2018	
Derek Kawakami	December 3, 2018	Incumbent	
