= Maryanne Kusaka =

American politician

Mayor of Kauai
- In office December 1994 – December 2, 2002
- Preceded by: JoAnn Yukimura
- Succeeded by: Bryan Baptiste

Personal details
- Born: September 11, 1935 (age 91) Kamuela, Hawaii
- Party: Republican
- Spouse: Charles "Bull" Kusaka
- Children: 1
- Education: University of Northern Colorado

Maryanne Winona Kusaka (born September 11, 1935) is an American politician, educator and former Mayor of the County of Kaua'i. She was mayor of Kauai from 1994 to 2002. A career Republican, Kusaka sought a seat in the Hawai'i State Senate in 2004 but lost to the Democratic Party's Gary Hooser by 16,274 votes to 8,270.

Kusaka was born in Kamuela on the Big Island of Hawai'i. Her parents, George Joseph Pinho and Mary Garcia Pinho moved the family to Hana on the island of Maui, where Kusaka was raised. She has two brothers, Kirtley Pinho and Glenn Pinho, and an adopted sister, Kehaulani Quartero.

Kusaka graduated from Mid Pacific Institute in Honolulu and then attended the University of Northern Colorado to become an elementary school teacher. In 1964, Kusaka moved from Maui to Kauai. For over 33 years, Kusaka taught at various elementary schools on the island of Kauai, including at Kapaa Elementary School where she had future Kauai mayor Bernard Carvalho in her classroom. She continued teaching up until her election to the mayor's office in 1994.

After her unsuccessful run in 2004 for the Hawai'i State Senate, Kusaka retired from politics. She continued to serve the community as president of the board of directors of the Kauai Museum.

Kusaka's husband is Charles Yoshio "Bull" Kusaka. She has one son, "Hawaii’s Entertainer" Junior Kekuewa Jr.
