= Bernard Carvalho =

American football player and politician (born 1961)

Bernard P. Carvalho Jr.
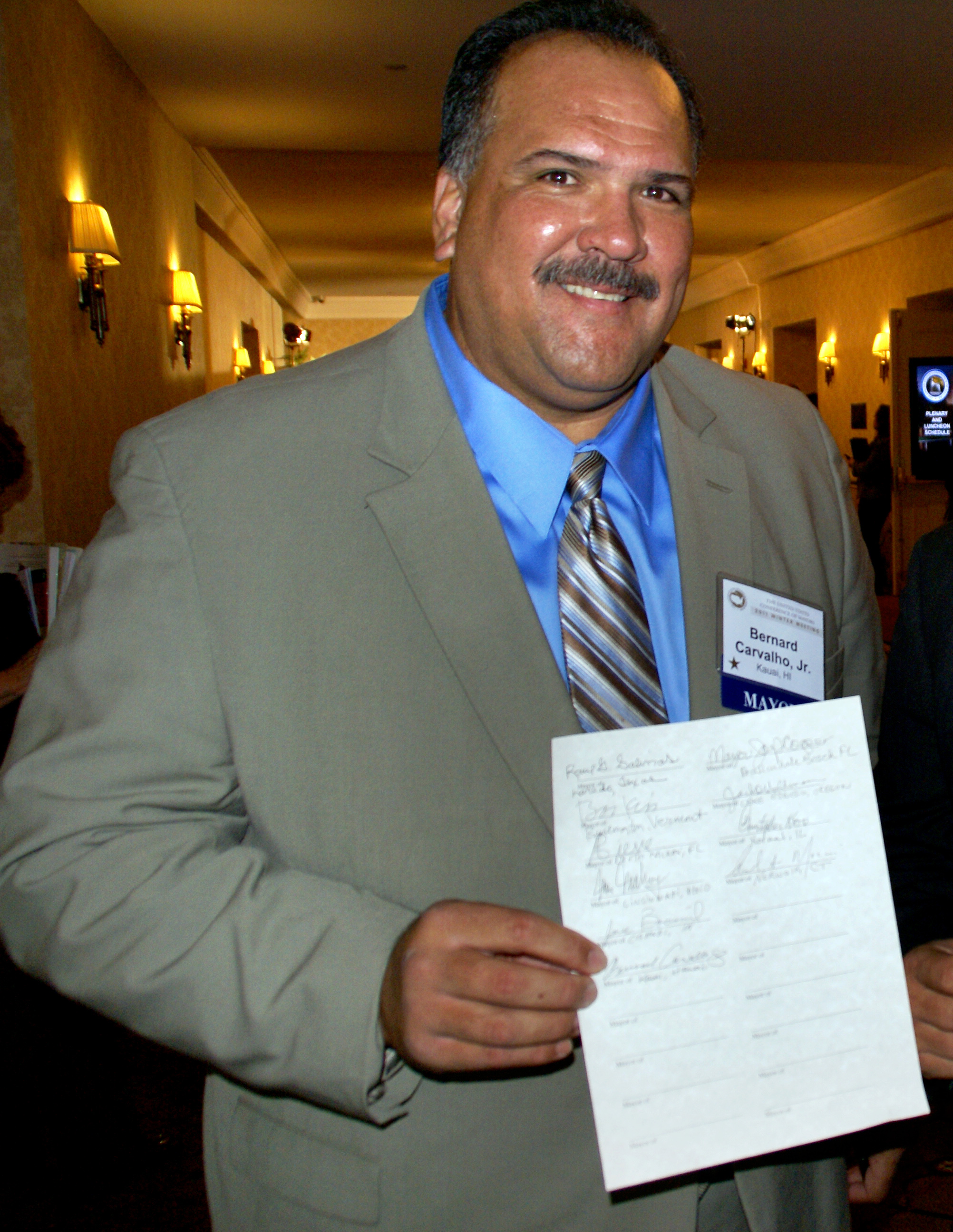

10th Mayor of Kauai
- In office December 1, 2008 – December 3, 2018
- Preceded by: Kaipo Asing
- Succeeded by: Derek Kawakami

Personal details
- Born: September 29, 1961 (age 64) Kauaʻi, Hawaii, U.S.
- Party: Democratic
- Spouse: Gina Godinez
- Children: 3, including Brennen
- Education: University of Hawaiʻi

Bernard P. Carvalho Jr. (born September 29, 1961) is an American politician and former American football player who served as Mayor of Kauaʻi in Hawaii from December 1, 2008, to December 3, 2018. Carvalho was elected in November 2008 to complete the unexpired term of former Mayor Bryan J. Baptiste, who died in office in June 2008.

== Biography ==
=== Early life ===
Carvalho was born on Kauaʻi island to Bernard P. Carvalho Sr. and Priscilla Hanohano. He graduated from Kapaa High School in 1979. While in high school, Carvalho was a star athlete in football and basketball. Carvalho then enrolled at the University of Hawaiʻi at Mānoa on a full football scholarship. He earned a bachelor's degree in communications and public relations in 1983.

Carvalho was drafted by the Miami Dolphins in 1984 shortly after graduating from college. He played in the National Football League for the Dolphins for two seasons. He returned to Kauaʻi after leaving the Dolphins in order to get married.

Carvalho is married to the former Regina "Gina" Godinez, who is originally from Oceanside, California. The couple have three children, Bronson, Brennan, and Brittney.

In addition to his political and football careers, Carvalho has also held positions in the tourism and airline industries on Kauaʻi.

=== Kauaʻi government ===
Carvalho was hired by the Kauaʻi Department of Public Works Recreation as an entry-level employee in 1985. Former Mayor Bryan J. Baptiste appointed Carvalho as Director of the Offices of Community Assistance in December 2002. He oversaw several Kauaʻi County government agencies, including transportation, housing, recreation, and the elderly. He is credited with the expansion of The Kauaʻi Bus service on the island.

In 2007, Mayor Baptiste appointed Carvalho to create and implement the new Kauaʻi Department of Parks and Recreation as its first director. The new department had been authorized by voters in the 2006 Hawaii general election. He remained head of the Department of Parks and Recreation until Mayor Baptiste's death in June 2008.

=== Mayor of Kauaʻi ===
Carvalho announced his candidacy for Mayor of Kauaʻi on July 8, 2008, to fill the remaining two years of former Mayor Bryan J. Baptiste's unexpired term. Baptiste had died in office on June 22, 2008. Carvalho made the announcement at the Historic County Building with supporters and members of the Baptiste family, including Baptiste's widow, Annette Baptiste.

Carvalho won the nonpartisan mayoral primary with 7,143 votes, or 39.8% of the vote. Former Kauaʻi Mayor JoAnn Yukimura, who has previously served as Mayor of Kauaʻi from 1988 until 1992, also qualified for the general election by finishing in second place with 5,372 votes (29.9%). Mel Rapozo and Rolf Bieber finished in third and fourth place respectively.

On November 4, 2008, Carvalho was elected Mayor of Kauaʻi in a special election held to fill the remaining two years of Baptiste's unexpired term in office. Carvalho defeated JoAnn Yukimura in the 2008 election. He was sworn into office in Lihue on December 1, 2008.

Carvalho announced his intention to seek a full four-year term in the 2010 mayoral election. Carvalho easily won the nonpartisan mayoral primary election held on September 18, 2010, garnering 13,024 votes, equivalent to 75.7% of the vote. Carvalho's only primary challenger, Diana LaBedz, a substance abuse counselor who campaigned against plastic bottles and genetically modified organisms, came in a distant second in the primary with 2,548 votes, or 14.8%. Under Kauaʻi County law, the two top vote earners in the primary, Carvalho and LaBedz, automatically advance to the mayoral general election.

Bernard Carvalho faced opponent Diana LaBedz in the mayoral general election on November 2, 2010. Carvalho easily won re-election to a full four-year term by taking 17,743 votes, while LaBedz placed a distant second with 3,678 votes. Mayor Carvalho was sworn into his first full term on Wednesday December 1, 2010, at Kauaʻi War Memorial Hall.

Carvalho and Hawaii County Mayor Billy Kenoi jointly endorsed former Honolulu Mayor Mufi Hannemann in the 2010 Democratic gubernatorial primary over Hannemann's challenger, former U.S. Rep. Neil Abercrombie. Despite the endorsements, Abercrombie went on to definitively defeat Hannemann in the primary election, 60 percent to 38 percent.

=== 2018 Hawaii lieutenant gubernatorial race ===
In 2017, Carvalho announced his candidacy for Lieutenant Governor of Hawaii. He finished in third place in the Democratic primary with 45,825 votes (19.2%).
