= Kamalō Sugar Plantation =

Kamalo Sugar Plantation
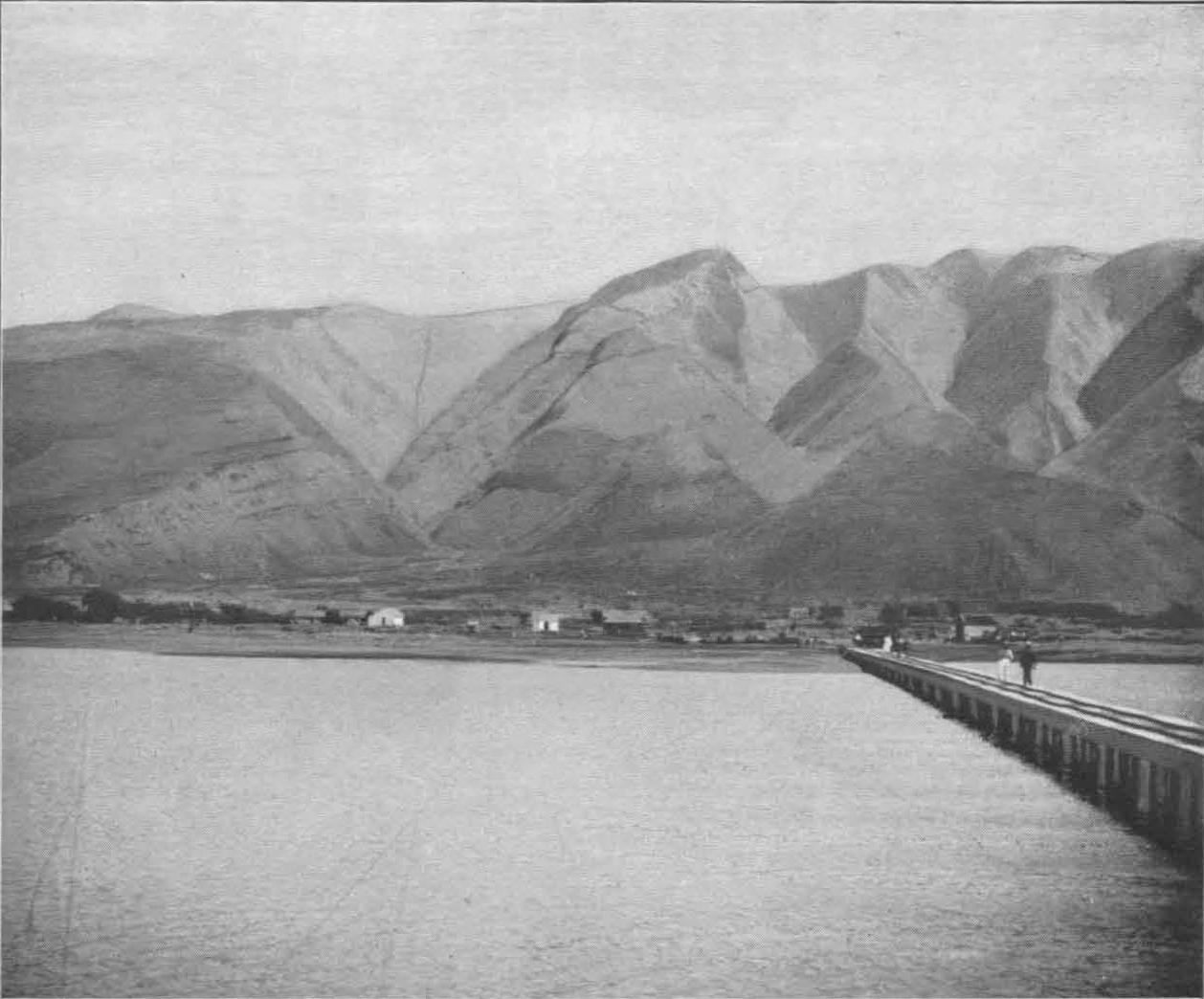
- Type: Private
- Industry: Sugarcane
- Founded: 1873; 153 years ago in Kamalō, Molokai, Kingdom of Hawaii
- Founder: John C. McColgan (1814-1890)
- Defunct: 1891
- Successor: Kamalo Sugar Company, Ltd.
- Key people: Hugh McCorriston, Daniel McCorriston (Manager)

The Kamalō Sugar Plantation (also: Kamaloo, Kamalo) was a sugarcane plantation and mill located in Kamalō, Molokai, Kingdom of Hawaii. It was the oldest sugar plantation and mill established on Molokai (Note: Of the three plantations and mills in operation on Molokai in 1880, Moanui Sugar Mill and Plantation was established in 1875 and Kalae Sugar Plantation was established in 1876.) and ceased operations before the 1906 founding of the California and Hawaiian Sugar Company.

== History ==
Kamalō on the Island of Molokai, Hawaiʻi, USA, located at 21°03′N 156°52′W

The Kamalō Sugar Plantation was founded by Irish-born businessman John C. McColgan (1814-1890) in 1873. In July of that year, he was reported to have leased a 4,000-acre tract of land from the late King Kamehameha V's estate that was located between Kaunakakai and Kalua‘aha. The mill and plantation were managed by McColgan's cousins, the Irish-born brothers Hugh McCorriston (1836-1926) and Daniel McCorriston (1840-1927).

The mill equipment for the Kamalō Sugar Plantation was the same as used at McColgan's sugarcane plantation located in Waiau, O‘ahu.

The Kamalō Sugar Plantation began exporting sugar to California in the 1880s, with a reported shipment of 353 bags aboard the SS Mariposa (1883) in September 1884.

Upon McColgan's death in 1890, ownership of the Kamalō Sugar Plantation passed in part to the McCorriston brothers.

== The Fire of 1891 ==
On August 7, 1891, the Kamalō Sugar Plantation burned to the ground due to unknown causes. The mill and plantation were insured for $25,000, (~$786,216 in 2024) and cattle turned onto the land for ranching.

== Revival ==
In 1897, the McCorriston brothers began discussing reviving the Kamalō Sugar Plantation. In 1899, the brothers sold their land to Frank Hustace, J.J. Egan, and Hugh's stepson Frank Hudson Foster, who incorporated under the name Kamalō Sugar Company, Limited.
