= Charles Burnett Wilson =

Marshal of the Kingdom of Hawaii (1850–1926)

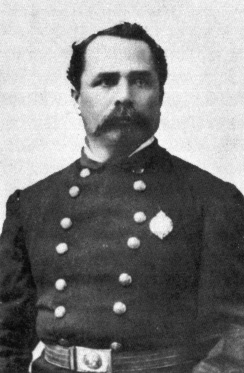

Personal details
- Born: Charles Burnett Wilson; 4 July 1850 Pacific Ocean
- Died: 12 September 1926 (aged 76) Honolulu, Territory of Hawaii
- Party: National Reform Party (Hawaii) (before 1900); Republican (United States) (after 1900)
- Relations: John H. Wilson; Charles Wilson (I)
- Nickname: C.B.

Military service
- Allegiance: Hawaiian Kingdom
- Branch/service: Royal Guards of Hawaii; Hawaii Police Department
- Rank: Marshal of the Kingdom
- Battles/wars: Overthrow of the Kingdom of Hawaii

Charles Burnett "C.B." Wilson (4 July 1850 – 12 September 1926) was a British and Tahitian superintendent of the water works, fire chief under King Kalākaua, and Marshal of the Kingdom under Queen Liliʻuokalani. Wilson was also the father of John H. Wilson.

== Early years ==
C. B. Wilson was born at sea, on a voyage between Tahiti and Fanning Island on 4 July 1850. His father Charles Burnett Wilson (1801–1853) was Scottish by ethnicity and a British subject but grew up in Papeete, Tahiti. He became a sea trader and captain of his own ship. He was moving his family to Fanning Island to establish a coconut plantation for producing coconut oil. His mother was Tetaria, a Tahitian chiefess. Wilson's father continued searching for unmapped islands in the Pacific. He was lost at sea en route from Australia to New Zealand in 1853. Tetaria, strained from the stresses of rearing two sons on a plantation island, handed over Wilson and his younger brother Richard to Captain Harry English who ran the plantation, while she returned to Tahiti. English left Wilson and his brother to a Captain Smith and his wife in Hawaii who ran a school which Wilson was enrolled in. Wilson was put on a career path of becoming a blacksmith. He married a hula dancer and friend of Liliʻuokalani, Eveline Townsend. Their son Johnny became a co-founder of the Democratic Party of Hawaii and mayor of Honolulu in the 20th century.

== Military service ==
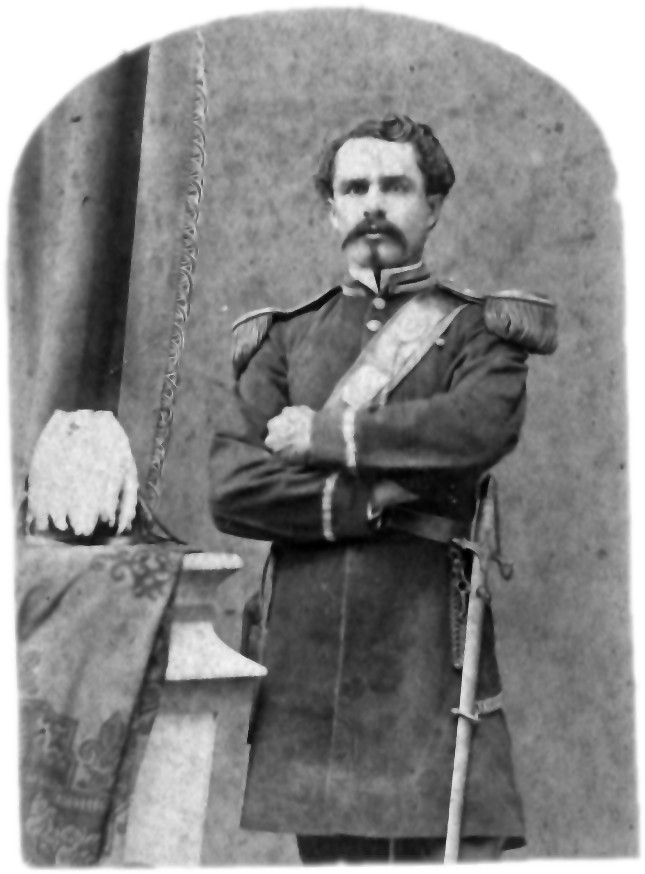
Charles B. Wilson, photograph by Menzies Dickson

In 1866 Wilson joined the Honolulu Rifles, a militia unit. He was a Sergeant during the 1873 Barracks Revolt and was present in the standoff. He later joined the Royal Guard where he became one of a squad of personal bodyguards to King Kalākaua. During the Honolulu Courthouse riot, an election riot by supporters of Queen Emma, who attacked the Legislature, Wilson rescued four representatives, three in a carriage by preventing rioters from overturning it, and catching one representative that was thrown out a courthouse window. On 31 January 1876, Wilson made First Lieutenant and Captain on 16 March 1877.

== Water Works ==
Wilson was appointed superintendent of the Water Works 1 July 1882, and fire chief on 1 July 1886. In 1886 Wilson was accused of embezzling from customer payments. An investigation by the Legislature found that a sum of approximately $16,000 were missing from the Water Works, and Wilson was blamed, although there is a possibility his predecessor was actually responsible. He paid back $10,000, Liliʻuokalani paid $5,000, and half of Wilson's salary was garnished until the missing money was made up. Wilson became involved in a plot to overthrow Kalākaua and replace him with his sister Liliʻuokalani in what became known as the Dominis Conspiracy. The plot was discovered, the conspirators surrendered, but Wilson was not charged, possibly because he was suspected of merely having been playing both sides.

== Marshal ==
After the death of King Kalākaua, Liliʻuokalani inherited the throne 29 January 1891. Wilson was appointed Marshal of the Kingdom 9 March that year. Wilson had a strong secular view of running the police forces and loosely regulated Christian-based laws on alcohol, gambling, and opium. He described these laws as "offenses created by statute, upon the commission of which the moral sense of the community apparently casts but little stigma." On these matters warnings were issued for excessively inappropriate conduct, if not improved would lead to arrests. He supported legalizing opium to legitimize and better regulate the drug. Wilson's appointment to Marshal is still seen as a contradiction since the queen was a devout Christian.

Due to Wilson's lenient interpretation of the law he made enemies with Social and Christian Conservatives. On the other side of the political spectrum the Liberals began to criticize Liliʻuokalani for not replacing the hated Bayonet Constitution and Wilson exposed a plot by members of the Liberal Party, calling themselves the Hawaiian Patriotic League, to overthrow the queen and replace the constitution themselves which became known as the Burlesque Conspiracy. Before the elections of 1892 Wilson himself confronted the Queen to create a new constitution, one speculation is that he threatened to lead a mutiny of the armed forces in protest of the 1887 Constitution.

== Overthrow ==
After a period of prolonged machinations on the part of non-native businessman with American support, Liliʻuokalani began to draft a new constitution. On 16 January 1893, Wilson was tipped off by detectives to another coup d'état to overthrow the Hawaiian monarchy this time by the Committee of Safety, the 13 leaders of the Hawaiian League a group within the Reform Party who had forced the Bayonet Constitution on King David Kalākaua, and were willing to overthrow the monarchy to maintain it. Wilson requested warrants to arrest the 13 member council, of the Committee of Safety, and put the Kingdom under martial law. Because the members had strong political ties with United States Government Minister John L. Stevens, the requests were repeatedly denied by Attorney General Arthur P. Peterson and the Queen's cabinet, fearing if approved, the arrests would escalate the situation. After a failed negotiation with Thurston, Wilson began to collect his men for the confrontation. Wilson and Captain of the Royal Household Guard, Samuel Nowlein, had rallied a force of 496 men who were kept at hand to protect the Queen. However, concerned with the wellbeing of her woefully outnumbered men, she surrendered. Wilson was the last commander of the last garrison to surrender at HPD headquarters. In his battle plan he would have made use of the several artillery pieces and two Gatling machine guns of the royal guard, to compensate for their shortage in numbers.

== Government in exile ==
Wilson went to Washington D.C. to lobby for the return of the monarchy even when the exiled Kingdom was dissolved by Liliʻuokalani under duress in 1895. He is regarded as the last of the former government to give up on restoration the Kingdom. Wilson joined the Hawaii Republican Party (formerly the Reform Party) believing it to be the only way to be an effective politician, but was kept a low ranking member. Despite his party affiliation he accused Republicans of denying his son, John, a civil engineer, government contracts because he was a Democrat, after these criticisms his son was given fair consideration and was able to win contracts. Wilson died in Honolulu on 12 September 1926.
