= Jim Clark (offensive lineman) =

American football player and politician (1929–2000)

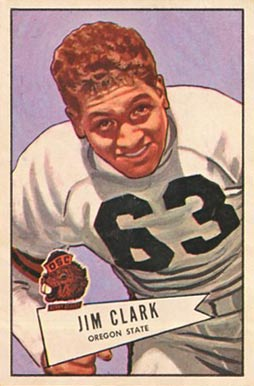
- Clark on a 1952 Bowman football card

No. 65
- Positions: Guard, offensive tackle, defensive tackle, linebacker

Personal information
- Born: July 28, 1929; Honolulu, Hawaii, U.S.
- Died: July 30, 2000 (aged 71)
- Listed height: 6 ft 1 in (1.85 m)
- Listed weight: 230 lb (104 kg)

Career information
- High school: Punahou School (Honolulu)
- College: Oregon State (1948–1951)
- NFL draft: 1952: 5th round, 55th overall pick

Career history
- Washington Redskins (1952–1953)

Career NFL statistics
- Games played: 24
- Games started: 9
- Stats at Pro Football Reference

James Kalaeone Clark (July 28, 1929 – July 30, 2000) was an American professional football guard in the National Football League (NFL) for the Washington Redskins. He played college football at Oregon State University and was selected in the fifth round of the 1952 NFL draft.

After his football career, Clark was elected to the Hawaii House of Representatives in 1962 as a Republican and served there until 1966, when he won his first term in the Hawaii Senate; in 1969 he switched to the Democratic Party. His father-in-law was the former Honolulu Mayor Neal Blaisdell.

== Early life ==
Clark was born on July 18, 1929 in Waikīkī to a Native Hawaiian family. He was a descendant of Duke Kahanamoku on his mother's side, while his father was known as one of the state's greatest football linemen. Clark and his younger brother, Herman, both attended the Punahou School, where they played football. Clark lettered three years in a row and was primarily a tackle. He was also a member of the school's track team and was state champion in the shot put in his senior year.

== College career ==
After graduating high school, Clark studied and played football at Oregon State University. He played for for four years, from 1948 to 1951, as a guard and played alongside his brother for at least one year. In 1952 Clark won the Otto Sitton Award for best lineman and was selected to play in the East-West Shrine Bowl, the Hula Bowl, and the College All-Star Bowl. He was also on the Oregon State wrestling team and was the Pacific Coast Conference Heavyweight Champion in 1951. After graduating he played in the Chicago Charities College All-Star Game in 1952.

== Professional career ==
Clark was drafted by the Washington Redskins in the fifth round of the 1952 NFL Draft. His brother Herman was drafted by the Chicago Bears in the fourth round. He played as a guard in 1952 and as a right tackle in 1953 and appeared in all regular season games in both seasons. Clark initially signed a contract to return to the Redskins in 1954, but ultimately retired from professional football instead.

== Coaching and labor career ==
After leaving professional football, Clark moved back to Hawaii and was involved in workers unions. He worked for the Hawaiian Government Employees Association and was a member of both the Hawaii Labor Relations Board, the Hawaii Public Employment Relations Board, and the Native Hawaiian Convention.

Clark also worked as head football coach for St. Louis High School in Honolulu. Just as when he had played college football, he coached the team alongside his brother.

== Political career ==
Clark became a Republican in 1953 after his father-in-law, Neal Blaisdell, ran to be Mayor of Honolulu as one.

In 1962 Clark won election to the Hawaii House of Representatives for District 8. He served there for two terms, leaving in 1966 after being elected to the Hawaii Senate. He served in the Senate until 1970 and was chair of the Youth Rights Committee in his final year. Clark became a Democrat in 1969.

== Personal life ==
Clark was married to Velma Blaisdell. The pair had one son and three daughters.

Clark died on July 30, 2000 at his home in Waikīkī. He is buried at Oʻahu Cemetery.
