= Lucy Thurston Blaisdell =

- Neal and Lucy Blaisdell 1956

First Lady of Honolulu
- In office 1955–1969
- Preceded by: Mary Kamala Crewes Petrie
- Succeeded by: Joyce Fasi

Personal details
- Born: Lucy Puniwai Thurston; August 16, 1903 Honolulu, Territory of Hawaii
- Died: December 16, 1986 (aged 83) Honolulu, State of Hawaii
- Party: Republican
- Spouse: Neal Blaisdell
- Children: 2
- Occupation: Teacher

Lucy Puniwai Blaisdell (née Thurston; August 16, 1903 – December 16, 1986) was the First Lady of Honolulu 1955–1969. She was by profession a teacher, who had a 36-year career in both Hawaii and New York.

== Background ==
Helen Catherine Kahanuulani Meek and Charles Henry Thurston named their daughter Lucy Puniwai Thurston when she was born in Honolulu. Lucy's mother was of Hawaiian ancestry and had been born in Hilo. Her father, a descendant of American Revolutionary War soldier Robert Thurston, relocated from Nova Scotia in 1889 and a decade later married Helen. In addition to Lucy, their children were Elizabeth, Clara and Paul J. Thurston. Paul became Director of the Budget for Hawaii.

In Scranton, Pennsylvania on October 23, 1926, Lucy married fellow teacher Neal Shaw Blaisdell, a descendant of John Adams Cummins whose mother was High Chiefess Kaumakaokane Papaliʻaiʻaina. The couple had known each other since childhood. Their daughter Velma was born in 1929, and Marilyn Puniwai was born in 1930.

When Lucy's father died in 1928, he was Honolulu Fire Chief. His successor as fire chief was William Wallace Blaisdell, Lucy's father-in-law.

== Teaching career ==
Lucy received her basic education at the college preparatory Punahou School. Training to become a teacher, she attended Territorial Normal School. Later transferring to Colorado College, she was accepted into the Sigma Upsilon sorority and received her Bachelor of Arts degree in 1926. She then matriculated at Columbia University in New York, where she earned her MA degree.

Her first teaching job was in Rochester, New York, while Neal was the football coach at Bucknell University in Pennsylvania, but the Blaisdells became homesick for Hawaii. In August 1927, they returned to Honolulu where Neal was on staff as athletic coach at President William McKinley High School, and Lucy taught at her old alma mater Territorial Normal School.

In Honolulu, she was named supervisor over the 7th grade classes at Territorial Normal School in 1930. She returned to Rochester for the 1937–38 school year as an exchange social studies teacher. During her career she also taught at the Honolulu schools of Washington Intermediate, Liliuokalani, Stevenson, President William McKinley High School, Kaimuki High School, Kaimuki Intermediate. She continued her teaching career after her husband was elected mayor, retiring in 1963 in order to spend more time with her family and friends, and to enjoy leisure activities.

== First Lady ==
Early on in their marriage, Lucy began documenting Neal's career in a scrapbook, and kept it up throughout his life. She helped him hone his oratory skills by acting as his test audience, and she also campaigned door-to-door on his behalf. An avid golfer herself who participated in women's tournaments, she and her husband golfed together when his time permitted. As a political wife, she refused to make speeches, but acted as hostess at formal and casual gatherings. While she was still teaching, she would put in a full day at school and then make the rounds of evening social and political events with her husband.

Neal referred to her as a "good partner", and when he traveled she accompanied him. On a five-week 1957 goodwill tour of the US mainland, in what she would later refer to as the best of her experiences in her role as mayoral wife, Lucy christened the renaming of the SS Monterey to the SS Matsonia, and the couple sailed home on the ship. As part of the couple's 1959 world tour, they participated in the Fifth Japanese-American Conference of Mayors and Chamber of Commerce Presidents. Lucy reported on their trip in The Honolulu Advertiser, commenting on the people and culture in post-World War II Osaka.

During their stop in India, she commented in her newspaper reports that Hawaii's tourism industry might benefit by adapting a few ideas from India's tour guides. She suggested that Hawaii's tour guides incorporate the state's history into the narrative, specifically in downtown Honolulu where Rev. Abraham Akaka had made recordings that could be heard at Kawaiahao Church. One of the things she felt would be important to include on the tours would be information about royal burial rites.

== Later life and death ==
Neal Blaisdell died of a stroke in 1975. Lucy Blaisdell died in 1986. Both are interred at Oahu cemetery in a joint plot.
