= Bryan Baptiste =

American politician

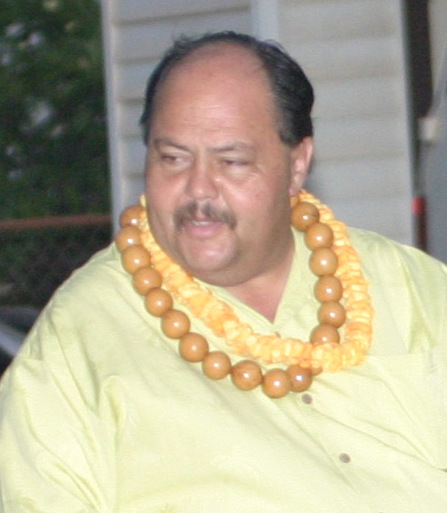

Mayor of Kauaʻi
- In office December 2, 2002 – June 22, 2008
- Preceded by: Maryanne Kusaka
- Succeeded by: Gary Heu (acting Kaipo Asing

Personal details
- Born: October 15, 1955 Lihue, Kauaʻi, Hawaii
- Died: June 22, 2008 (aged 52) Lihue, Kauaʻi, Hawaii
- Party: Republican
- Spouse: Annette
- Children: 4

Bryan J. Baptiste (October 15, 1955 – June 22, 2008) was an American politician and member of the Republican Party. He served as mayor of the County of Kauaʻi in Hawaii from 2002 until his death.

== Early life ==
Baptiste was born in Līhuʻe, Kauaʻi. He was the youngest child Eva Sybil Gomes and Anthony "Tony" Carmos Baptiste. Baptiste was Kānaka Maoli (Indigenous Hawaiian), Chinese, and a descendant of Portuguese immigrants who settled in Hawaii. He came from a family that has long been involved in politics on Kauaʻi, including his father, who was chair of the former Kauaʻi county board of supervisors, a position equivalent to mayor today.

== Career ==
In 1996, Baptiste, then manager of the Kaua'i War Memorial Convention Hall and head of an islandwide park beautification program, was elected to the Kaua'i County Council. Baptiste served as a member of the council for six years before running for mayor to succeed Republican Maryanne Kusaka, who was ineligible to run again due to term limits. In the 2002 mayoral election, Baptiste faced two fellow councilmembers, Democrats Ron Kouchi and Randal Valenciano. In the September primary election, Baptiste received 38% of the vote, Kouchi received 35%, and Valenciano won 21%, allowing Baptiste and Kouchi to advance to the runoff. In the runoff Baptiste defeated Kouchi, winning 12,174 votes to Kouchi's 10,517.

In 2006, Baptiste avoided a runoff by two votes (he needed fifty percent of the vote plus one vote to win), joking, "We had one vote more than we needed to win. That's the cushion."

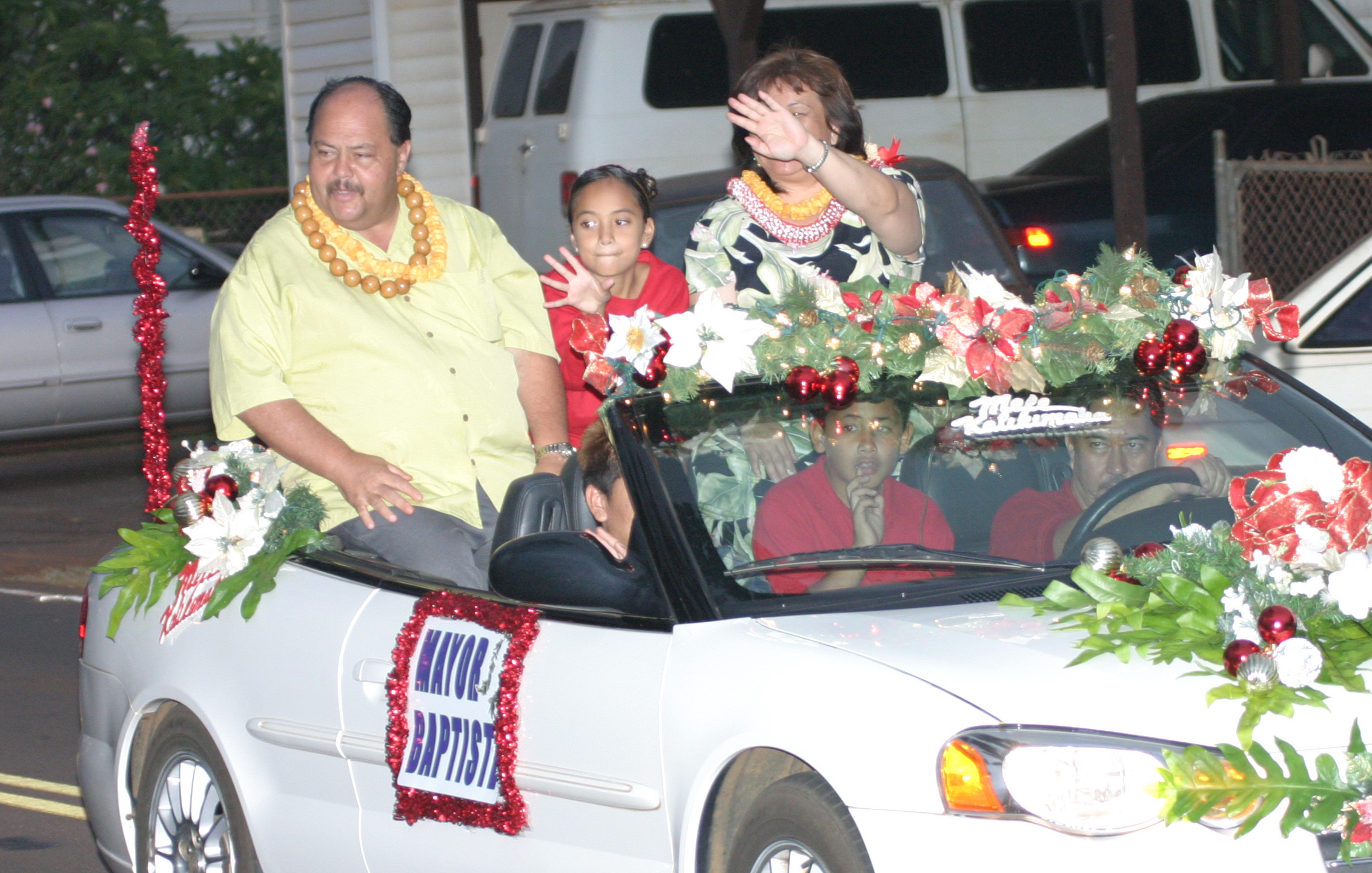
Mayor Baptiste at the 2005 Waimea Christmas Parade

Baptiste died while in office of a heart attack on June 22, 2008. He was succeeded by his former deputy, Bernard Carvalho, who won a special election to complete Baptiste's term.

== Legacy ==
Baptiste has since been memorialized with the Kapa'a New Town Park Facility renamed in his honor, following a million dollar upgrade of park facilities, including the installation of new lighting systems, locker rooms, and grass strips for the football field, improvements that Baptiste had long advocated for. He is survived by his wife Annette and their four children.
