= Eduardo Malapit =

American politician (1933–2007)

Mayor of Kauaʻi
- In office 1974–1982
- Preceded by: Francis M. F. Ching
- Succeeded by: Tony Kunimura

Personal details
- Born: April 6, 1933 Hanapepe, Kauaʻi, Hawaii
- Died: August 27, 2007 (aged 74) Līhuʻe, Kauaʻi, Hawaii
- Party: Democratic
- Spouse: Elizabeth
- Education: University of Hawaiʻi; Notre Dame Law School

Eduardo Enabore Malapit (April 6, 1933 – August 27, 2007) was an American Democratic politician who served as Mayor of Kauaʻi, Hawaii. Elected for four consecutive two-year terms as mayor of Kauaʻi beginning in 1974, he was the first Filipino American mayor of any United States municipality. He was widely respected in Kauaʻi and throughout Hawaii for his belief in community service, and was known as "Mala" by friends and constituents.

== Early life ==
Eduardo Malapit was born in Kauaʻi on April 6, 1933. He was raised in the town of Hanapepe. Malapit's father and mother, Eusebio and Leonila Malapit, owned the Hanapepe Pool Hall during the 1960s. He often worked as a shoeshiner in front of his parents' business. Malapit attended Waimea High School in Kauaʻi, where he played football.

Malapit obtained a bachelor's degree in economics from the University of Hawaiʻi. He went on to receive a jurisprudence degree from the University of Notre Dame Law School in 1962. He worked as a public prosecutor after graduation.

== Political career ==
Eduardo Malapit's first public office was as a councilman on the Kauaʻi County Council for eight years.

Malapit was elected as Mayor of Kauaʻi in 1974, becoming the first mayor of Filipino American descent in the United States. Malapit served as mayor for four consecutive two-year terms (total of 8 years) from 1974 until 1982. According to news reports, Malapit kept a pair of firefighting boots hidden behind a curtain in his office while mayor in order to respond quickly to emergencies.

Malapit oversaw a development boom, as well as difficult periods, while mayor of Kauaʻi. Malapit is often credited with improving and updating Kauaʻi's infrastructure during his tenure as mayor. Under his authority, Kauaʻi's public parks were renovated. Brand new community centers, police stations, fire stations, sewage treatment plants, and garbage transfer stations were built on the island. However, Malapit's term as mayor also coincided with the Nukoli'i development, which caused an island-wide controversy. Malapit's own mayoral office was heavily damaged by a pipe bomb. It is believed that Malapit was targeted because of the Nukoli'i development. The perpetrators of the bombing were never captured and are still at large.

Malapit left the mayor's office in 1982. His next post as a public official was the chairman of the Hawaii state Board of Labor and Industrial Relations. Malapit held that post from 1983 to 1987.

Malapit served as the governor's representative for the County of Kauaʻi from 1987 to 1990. He also worked as a part-time magistrate.

== Community service ==
Malapit was known in Kauaʻi for his leadership in community service. He held the positions of president and legal adviser for the Kauaʻi Pop Warner football league. He also served as president of the West Kauai Jaycees. Malapit also worked with a number of other sports related organizations including the Koloa Youth Baseball Organization.

Additionally, Malapit served as president of the Koloa school PTA and the Koloa Lions Club. He worked as the director of the Hawaii Visitors Bureau, a statewide position. A practicing Roman Catholic, Malapit was appointed to the Kauaʻi Catholic Vicariate board which advises the Bishop on issues facing local Kauaʻi Catholic schools. Malapit was also active on the Kauaʻi Filipino Community Council.

== Death ==
Eduardo Malapit died on Monday, August 27, 2007 at Wilcox Memorial Hospital in Līhuʻe, Kauaʻi. He was 74 years old. Malapit was survived by his wife, Elizabeth, to whom he had been married for 45 years, and four sons, Kevin, Lon, Kent and Lyle.

U.S. Representative Mazie Hirono (D-HI) commented on Malapit's life, "He was my friend and supporter. He was a colorful and humble man who had a great sense of loyalty and friendship. I will certainly miss Mala." Malapit had supported Hirono during her successful run for Lieutenant Governor of Hawaii in 1994.
