= Donna Tanoue =

American lawyer

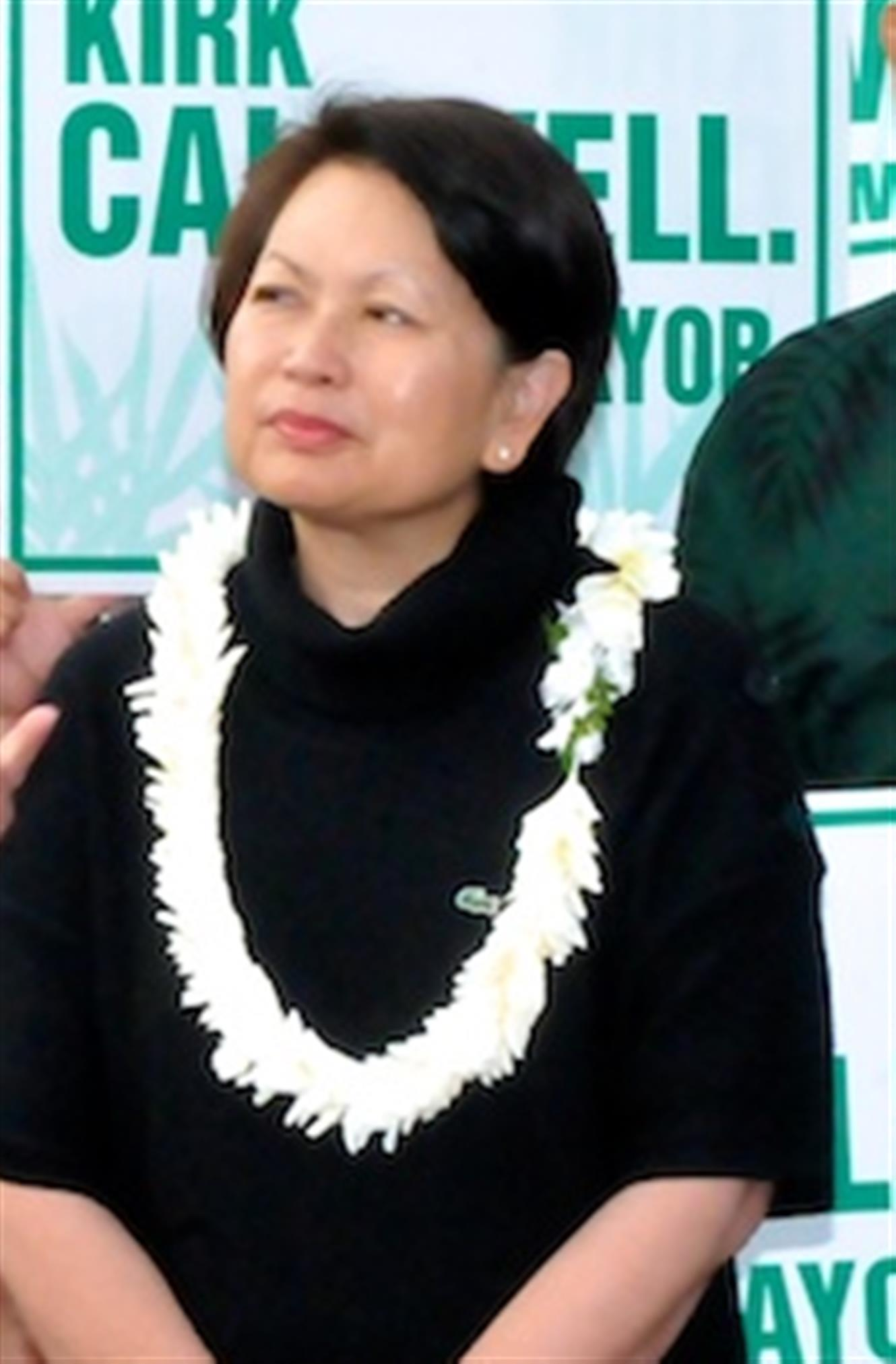

First Lady of Honolulu
- In role January 2, 2013 – January 2, 2021
- Preceded by: Judy Carlisle
- Succeeded by: Vacant
- In role July 20, 2010 – October 11, 2010; Acting
- Preceded by: Gail Hannemann
- Succeeded by: Judy Carlisle

Chair of the Federal Deposit Insurance Corporation
- In office May 26, 1998 – July 11, 2001
- President: Bill Clinton; George W. Bush
- Preceded by: Andrew C. Hove Jr. (Acting)
- Succeeded by: John N. Reich (Acting)

Personal details
- Born: May 5, 1954 (age 72) Honolulu, Hawaii
- Party: Democratic
- Spouse: Kirk Caldwell
- Education: University of Hawaiʻi at Mānoa (BA); Georgetown University (JD)

Donna Tanoue (born May 5, 1954) was the 17th chair of the U.S. Federal Deposit Insurance Corporation (FDIC) from May 26, 1998, until July 11, 2001. In April 2002 she became vice chair and Managing Committee member of the Bank of Hawaii.

As FDIC chair, Tanoue focused attention on emerging risks in the financial institution industry, and especially on the risks that arise from subprime lending. Investigating fraud at banks was prioritized for FDIC examiners, because recent changes in the business of banking and innovations in computer technology had created greater opportunity for financial irregularities. And the FDIC also refined its system of setting deposit insurance premiums in an attempt to capture more accurately the risks that institutions posed to its insurance funds.

Tanoue's FDIC took an aggressive approach to supervising federally insured financial institutions to ensure their readiness for the year 2000 date change. Tanoue personally appeared on network television news programs to describe the banking industry's preparedness for Year 2000, assuring the public that there would be no significant disruptions in the banking system because of Y2K.

Before she became FDIC chairman, Tanoue was a partner in the Hawaii law firm of Goodsill Anderson Quinn & Stifel, which she joined in 1987. She specialized in banking, real estate finance, and governmental affairs.

From 1983 to 1987 Tanoue was Commissioner of Financial Institutions for the State of Hawaii. In that post she was the primary state regulator for state-chartered banks, savings and loan associations, trust companies, industrial loan companies, credit unions, and escrow depository companies. Tanoue also served as Special Deputy Attorney General to the Department of Commerce and Consumer Affairs for the State of Hawaii from 1981 to 1983.

Tanoue received a J.D. from the Georgetown University Law Center in 1981 and a B.A. from the University of Hawaiʻi at Mānoa in 1977.

Her husband, Kirk Caldwell, was Mayor of Honolulu from 2013 to 2021.
