= JoAnn Yukimura =

American politician (born c. 1949)

5th Mayor of Kauai
- In office 1988–1994
- Preceded by: Tony Kunimura
- Succeeded by: Maryanne Kusaka

Personal details
- Born: 1949 or 1950 (age 76–77)
- Spouse: John Wehrheim
- Education: Stanford University (BA); University of Washington School of Law (JD)

JoAnn Yukimura is an American politician who served as the first female Mayor of Kauai County. She also served on the Kauai County Council for over 22 years.

== Early life and education ==
Yukimura graduated from Kaua'i High School in 1967 as valedictorian. She earned a bachelor's degree in psychology from Stanford University in 1971 and an J.D. from the University of Washington School of Law in 1974.

== Career ==
Yukimura was first elected to the Kauai County Council in 1976 at the age of 26, serving until 1980. She served later terms from 1984 to 1988, 2002 to 2008, and 2010 to 2018.

Yukimura served as mayor during Hurricane Iniki in 1992, "the most powerful hurricane in the Hawaiian islands [that] century."

Over her career, Yukimura advocated for environmental and land use planning issues. She supported efforts to oppose suburbanization of Kilauea’s agricultural lands, stop development of condominiums on Alekoko (Menehune) Fishpond, fight a proposal to build three hotels in Nukolii, secure and protect 140 acres as part of the Kilauea Point National Wildlife Refuge, and establish the Kauai Public Land Trust.

== Personal life ==
Yukimura is the oldest of five children. She was born into a Christian family as a member of the Lihue Christian Church.
