= Kaipo Asing =

American politician (1930–2022)

Bill "Kaipo" Asing

Mayor of Kauai
- In office July 17, 2008 – December 1, 2008
- Preceded by: Bryan Baptiste; Gary Heu (acting)
- Succeeded by: Bernard Carvalho

Personal details
- Born: September 11, 1930 Hā'ena, Hawaii
- Died: October 16, 2022 (aged 92)
- Spouse: Patsy Asing
- Children: 5

William "Kaipo" Ulrich Asing Jr. (September 11, 1930 – October 16, 2022) was an American politician in the US state of Hawaii. Asing served as the acting mayor of Kauai from July 17, 2008, until December 1, 2008, following the death of former Mayor Bryan J. Baptiste.

== Biography ==
Asing was born in Hā'ena, Kauai. Asing died on October 16, 2022, at the age of 92.

=== Career ===
Kaipo Asing was employed with the Hawaiian Telephone Company for 45 years, including 40 years as a permanent employee and 35 years as a manager and instructor. He spent fifteen years working for the Hawaiian Telephone Company in Honolulu before retiring from the company in December 1991.

Asing was also a member of the International Association of Approved Basketball Officials for twenty-five years.

=== Political career ===
Asing has served fourteen consecutive two-year terms on the Kauai County Council, as of 2010, for a total of 28 years on the council. He was re-elected for his fourteenth and most recent term in 2008. Asing has served as the chairman of the Kauai County Council for eight years (four terms), during most of the period between 2002 and 2010. He has also served as a chairman, vice chair or member of every Kauai County Council committee between 1990 and 2010. Asing has also served as a former member of the Hawaii State Association of Counties - Real Property Tax Committee.

Asing declined to seek re-election to the council in 1998 to pursue an unsuccessful campaign for mayor of Kauai County. However, he was re-elected to the council two years later.

Mayor Bryan J. Baptiste unexpectedly died of cardiac arrest on June 22, 2008, leaving a vacancy in the office. Baptiste's administrative assistant, Gary Heu, served as acting mayor until the Kauai County Council could choose an acting successor and hold a special election to permanently fill the mayorship. On July 7, 2008, the Kauai County Council unanimously choose Kaipo Asing, who was council chairman at the time, to become acting mayor of Kauai until a special election in November 2008. Asing temporarily stepped down as council chairman before taking office as mayor.

Asing was sworn in as acting mayor of Kauai on July 17, 2008, in the rotunda of the Moikeha Building at the Civic Center in Lihue. He held the office until Mayor Bernard Carvalho was sworn in to fill the remaining two years of Baptiste's term on December 1, 2008.

Asing was re-elected to a fourteenth term on the Kauai County Council in 2008, pledging at the time not to seek another term in office in the future. However, Asing, who was serving as council chairman, surprised many observers by filing for re-election in July 2010 to run for an additional term in the Kauai County Council.

Asing came in eighth place in the nonpartisan primary election held on September 18, 2010. First-term Kauai County Councilmember Dickie Chang narrowly led Asing for seventh place by just 150 votes, placing Asing in eighth place and out of contention for re-election. Chang had 6,581 votes to Asing's 6,431 votes in the primary. Asing pledged retire from politics and not to seek election to any future office if defeated in the 2010 primary.

Asing lost his re-election bid for a 15th term on the Kauai County Council in the general election on November 2, 2010. The top seven vote getters win election to the County Council, which is composed of seven elected members. Asing finished in ninth place, with approximately 7,705 votes. He left office on December 1, 2010, when the new council was sworn in.
