= Joseph J. Fern =

American politician

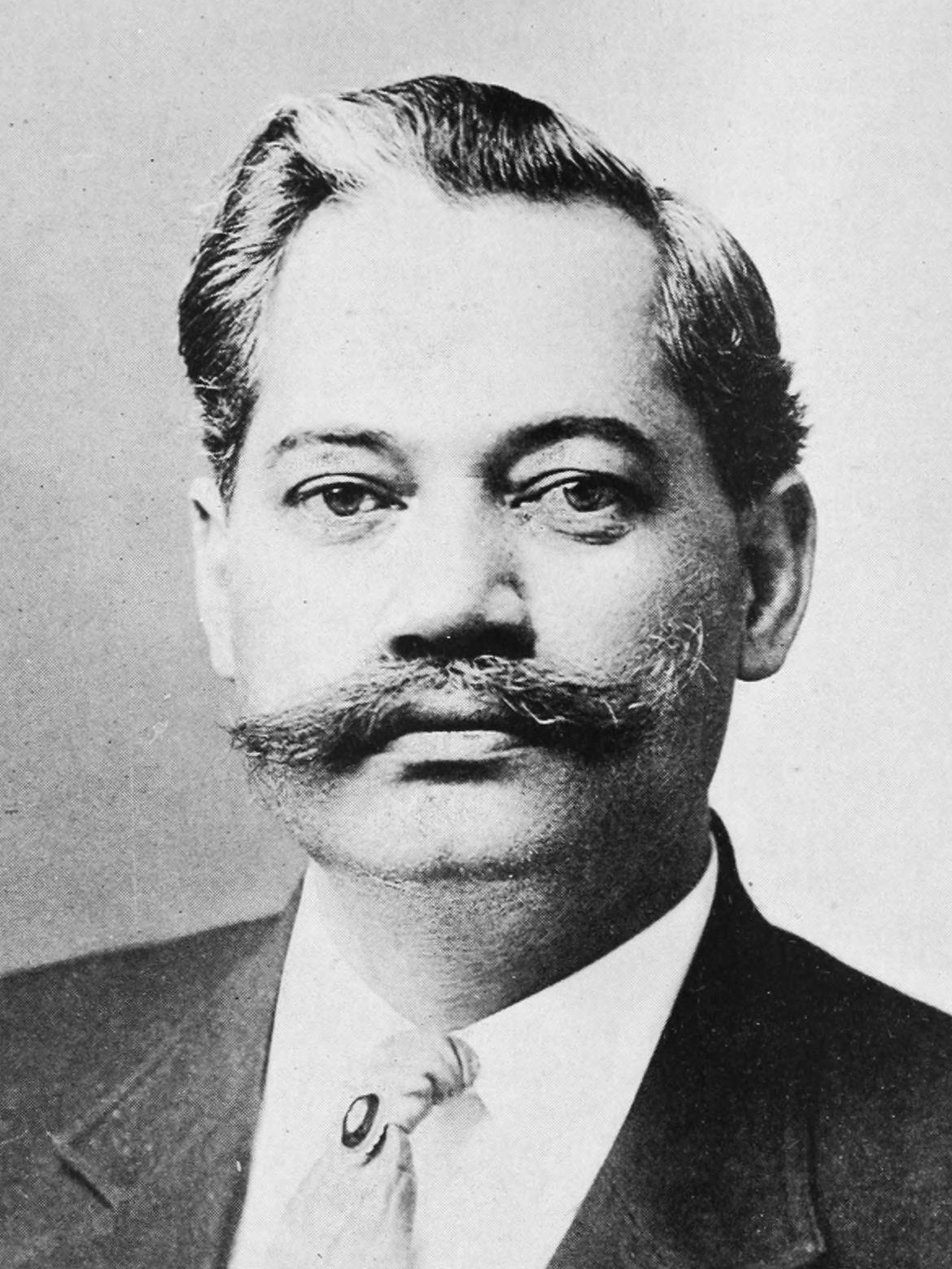

1st Mayor of Honolulu
- In office January 4, 1909 – January 4, 1915
- Preceded by: Office established
- Succeeded by: John C. Lane
- In office January 4, 1917 – February 20, 1920
- Preceded by: John C. Lane
- Succeeded by: John H. Wilson

Personal details
- Born: April 25, 1872 Kohala, Kingdom of Hawaii
- Died: February 20, 1920 (aged 47) Honolulu, Territory of Hawaii (now State of Hawaii)
- Resting place: King Street Catholic Cemetery, Honolulu
- Party: Democratic
- Spouse(s): Julia Natua; Sheba Kaiheku'i Alapai; Emma Smith
- Children: 14
- Occupation: ship's master, jailer
- Profession: Transportation

Joseph James Fern (August 25, 1872 – February 20, 1920) was the first Mayor of Honolulu from 1909 to 1915 and again from 1917 to 1920. During and after his tenure, Fern became one of the most beloved political figures in the Territory of Hawaii. He was one of the first members of the Hawai'i Democratic Party.

== Early years ==
Fern was born on the Big Island of Hawaiʻi to James Fern and Kaipua Kaipo Luahoomae on August 25, 1872. In 1885, Fern worked in the town of Kohala at the Union Mill Plantation. In 1892, he moved to the island of Oʻahu to work at the Hawaiian Tramways Company, driving trolleys and streetcars through downtown Honolulu. In 1894, Fern traded jobs to work as a ship's master at the Wilder Steamship Company.

== Political career ==
At the time the Democratic Party had been deadlocked with infighting although Fern could not be free from the feuds he preferred to avoid them. In 1907, Fern was influenced to run for a seat on the Honolulu Board of Supervisors. He won the election and served for two years before the creation of the office of Mayor of Honolulu. The office of mayor was created upon the insistence of Washington, D.C., despite the opposition of the Big Five oligarchy that dominated the economy of Hawaii. Fern was multilingual, speaking Hawaiian, English, Japanese, Chinese, and Portuguese and used it to his advantage throughout his political career. Another advantage he had was with his avoidance of the Democratic infighting he made few enemies which resulted in relatively united support by Democrats for Fern. On January 4, 1909, Fern won the special election for the newly created mayor's office by a margin of 7 votes and re-elected in the regular elections in 1910 with a margin of less than 100 votes. In 1915, he lost a reelection bid against Hawaii Republican Party member John Lane. After leaving office Fern was appointed City Jailer by Sheriff Charles Rose. When Lane tried to run for reelection, Fern challenged his successor again and won by 300 votes.

== Family life ==
He married Julia Natua in 1889 and had two children: Julia, James. In 1894, he married Sheba Kaiheku'i Alapai (died 1910) with whom he had twelve children: Joseph James, Mary K., Nancy K., George, Kaipo, Elizabeth, Marion, Mary, Keo, Santa Clara, Henry C., Esta. In 1910, he married Emma Keliikekukahilikaleleokalahikiolaokalani Smith. They had one child, Victoria Kukahilihiapoaliilani.

== Death and legacy ==
Fern died from complications with diabetes, while still in office. At the beginning of 1920 Fern came down with a high fever and he took several sick leaves. On February 9 he was admitted to Queen's Medical Center, Fern died there February 20, 1920. Evidence of his popularity among the people he served, Fern was granted a state funeral and was laid in the throne room of ʻIolani Palace. During the burial rites at the King Street Catholic Cemetery, the United States Army Air Corps presented a fly-over ceremony in a v-formation.

Fern Elementary school in the Kalihi neighborhood in Honolulu was named after him.
