= George F. Wright =

American politician

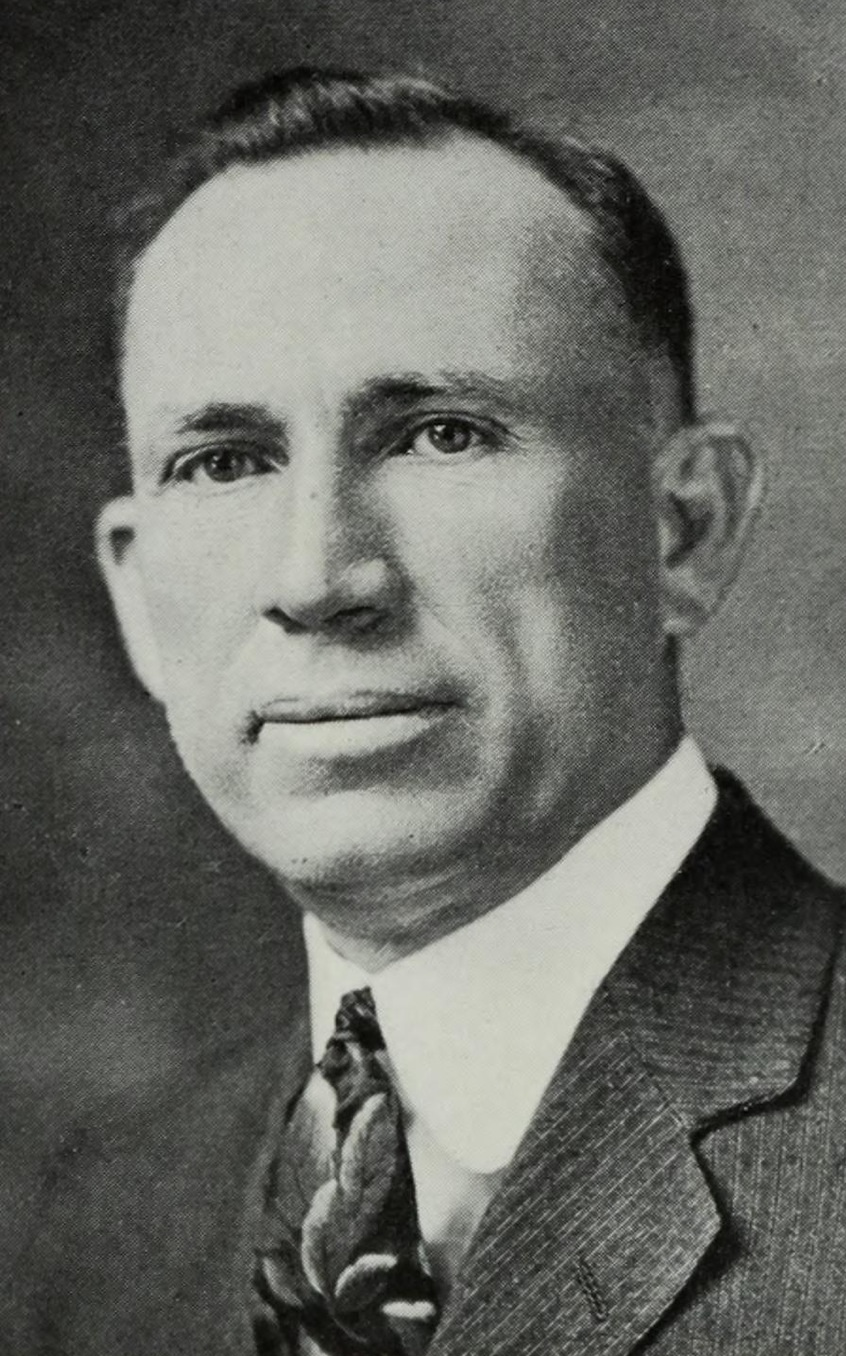

5th Mayor of City & County of Honolulu
- In office January 3, 1931 – July 2, 1938
- Preceded by: John H. Wilson
- Succeeded by: Charles Crane

Personal details
- Born: April 23, 1881 Honolulu, Kingdom of Hawaii
- Died: July 2, 1938 (aged 57) aboard the SS Mariposa
- Party: Republican
- Spouse: May Martha Lycett
- Children: Marshall Wright
- Parent(s): William Wilson Wright and Annie Marshall Wright
- Occupation: Surveyor

George Frederick Wright (April 23, 1881 – July 2, 1938) was Mayor of Honolulu from 1931 to 1938. Politically he was Republican.

Born in Honolulu, George Frederick Wright was the son of William Wilson Wright (1846–1921), a carriage-maker, and Annie (née Marshall) Wright (1847–1916). Both his parents were English, his mother was born in Darlington while his father was originally from Langton; the couple had lived in Australia and New Zealand prior to settling down in Hawaii in 1880. He attended the old Fort Street School and graduated from Honolulu High School in 1898. Wright worked as a governmental surveyor and engineer and with his brother Stanley Wright were members of the business firm of Wright, Harvey & Wright. He enlisted in the National Guard and during the First World War served on a local coastal artillery unit.

Wright became Mayor of Honolulu in 1931. He died in office in 1938 while traveling aboard the SS Mariposa. Memorials to him were installed at a downtown housing project and at Washington Middle School in the Pāwaʻa section of the city.

Mayor Wright was married to May Martha Lycett in 1905. Their son, Marshall Frederick Wright lived in Honolulu with his wife, Caroline Card Wright. They raised three children (Marsha, Byron, Fred).

Preceded by John H. Wilson	Mayor of Honolulu; 1931–1938	Succeeded by Charles Crane
