= Charles Crane =

Businessman and politician in Hawaii

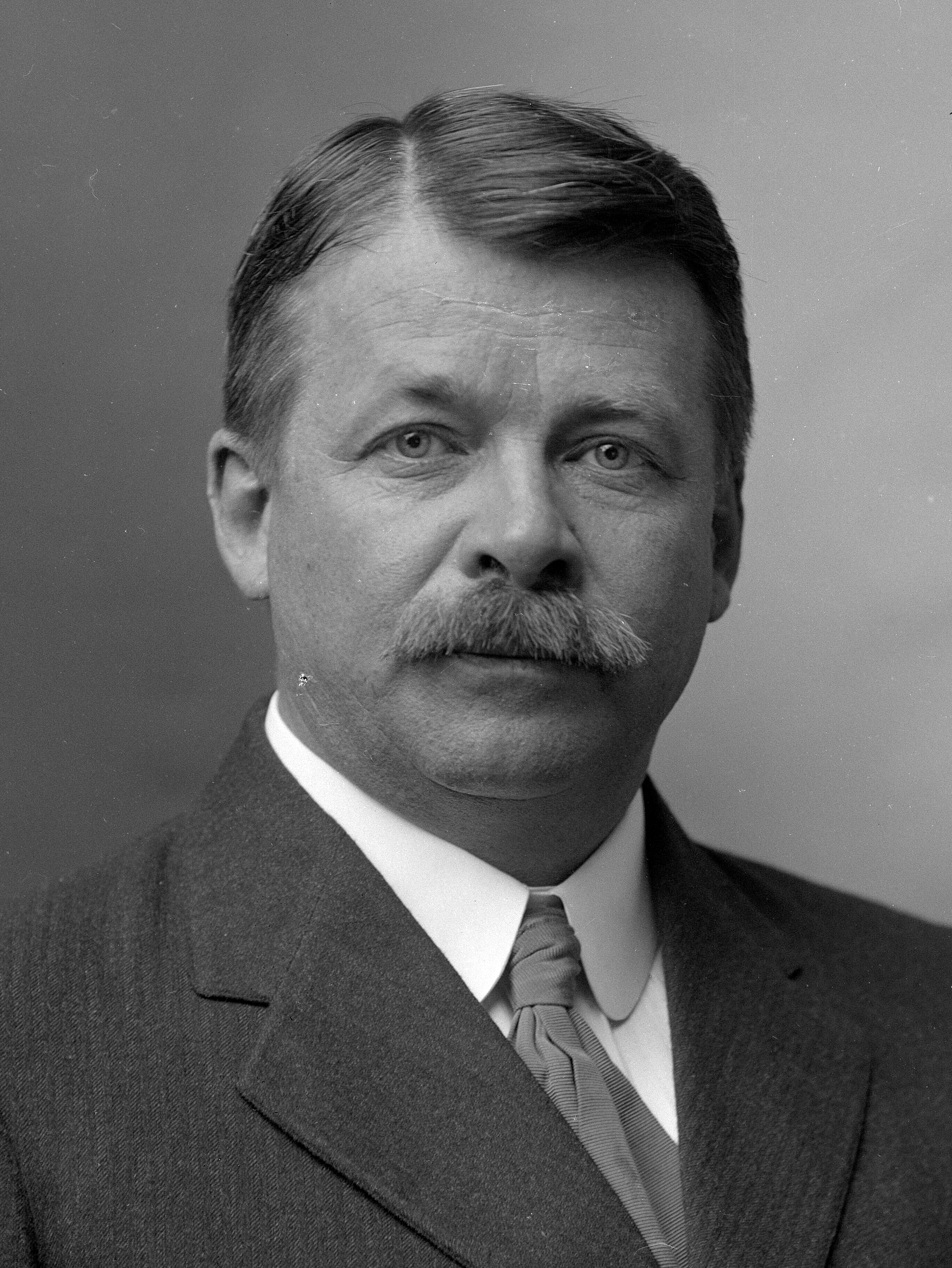

6th Mayor of City & County of Honolulu
- In office July 15, 1938 – January 2, 1941
- Preceded by: George F. Wright
- Succeeded by: Lester Petrie

Personal details
- Born: Charles Spencer Crane; January 4, 1869 Honolulu, Kingdom of Hawaii
- Died: September 13, 1958 (aged 89) Maui, Hawaii
- Party: Republican

Charles Spencer Crane (January 4, 1869 – September 13, 1958) was a businessman and politician in Hawaii.

== Life ==
Crane was born in Honolulu on January 4, 1869, the son of a whaler captain Ezra Dean Crane and Emma Ann Still Crane. He started working at the Honolulu telephone company. In February 1897 he worked in the business department of the Hawaiian Gazette Company, became assistant manager of the Gazette in 1900, and in November 1905 became manager of the publishing company. From 1908 to 1919 he published a Hawaiian language newspaper called Ka Nupepa Kuokoa. Crane married Emma Spurrell Thompson on October 16, 1922, at Hilo. He eventually became executive vice president of what would become the Honolulu Advertiser.

After Advertiser owner Lorrin A. Thurston died, his son Lorrin Potter Thurston took over in October 1931, and Crane resigned from the newspaper to go into politics. He was elected to the board of supervisors for the City and County of Honolulu. He was appointed Mayor of Honolulu July 15, 1938 upon the death of George F. Wright, and served until January 2, 1941. He was elected to the Territory of Hawaii senate 3rd district in 1943 and 1945. He retired for a while to California, and then returned to live with his son Ezra Crane who was editor of the Maui News. He died on Maui September 13, 1958.

Crane is memorialized in Honolulu by Crane Playground in the Kaimukī section of Honolulu at 21°17′9″N 157°48′53″W.

Preceded by George F. Wright	Mayor of Honolulu; 1938-1941	Succeeded by Lester Petrie
