= Neal Blaisdell =

American politician

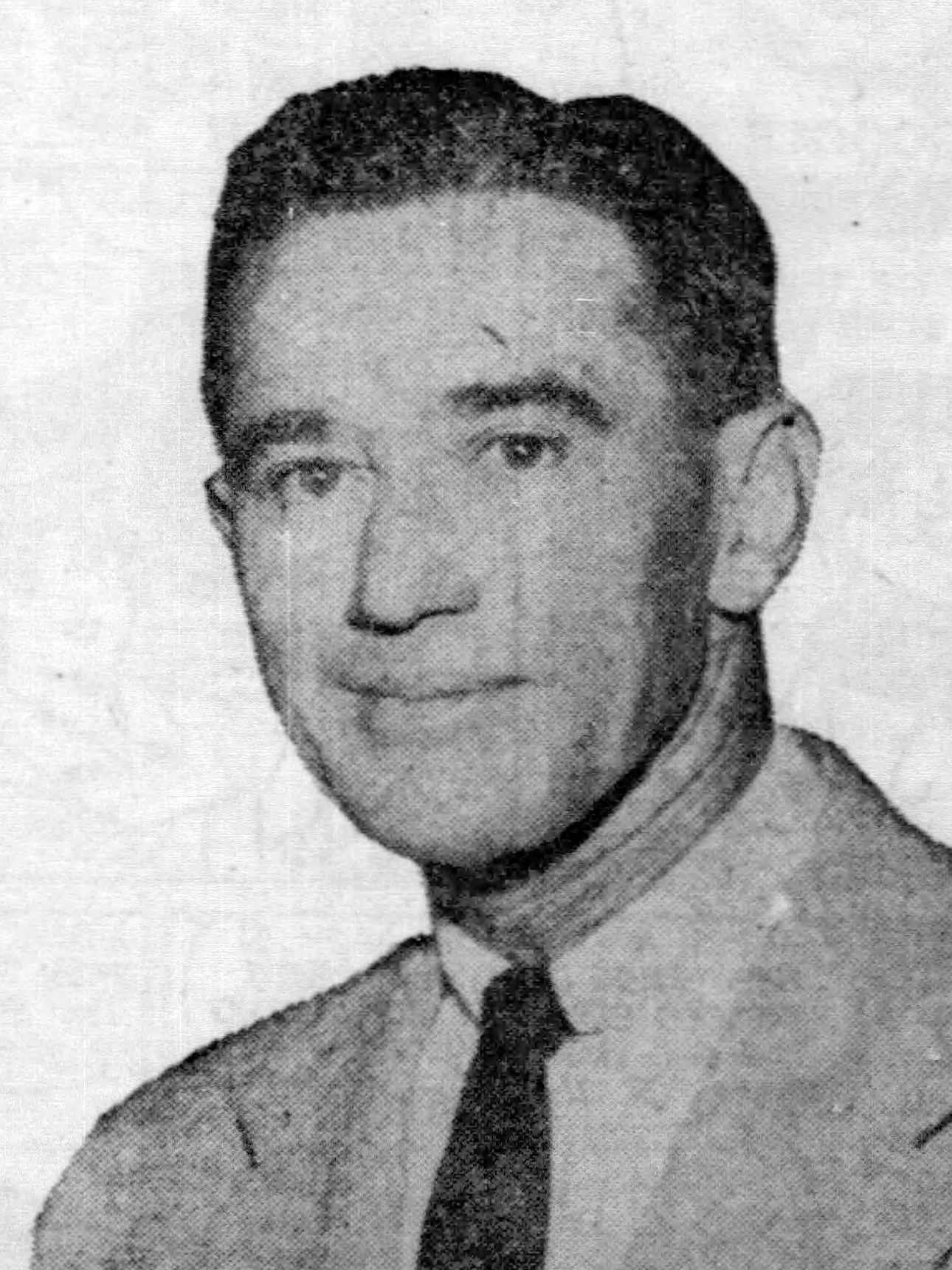

8th Mayor of Honolulu
- In office 1955–1969
- Preceded by: John H. Wilson
- Succeeded by: Frank Fasi

23rd President of the United States Conference of Mayors
- In office 1965–1966
- Preceded by: Raymond Tucker
- Succeeded by: Jerome Cavanagh

Member Hawaii Territorial Senate
- In office 1946–1950

Member Hawaii Territorial House of Representatives
- In office 1944–1946

Personal details
- Born: Neal Shaw Blaisdell; November 6, 1902 Honolulu, Territory of Hawaii
- Died: November 5, 1975 (aged 72) Honolulu, Hawaii, U.S.
- Resting place: Oahu Cemetery
- Party: Republican
- Spouse: Lucy Thurston
- Education: University of Hawaiʻi at Mānoa; Bucknell University
- Profession: Teacher

Neal Shaw Blaisdell (November 6, 1902 – November 5, 1975) served as Mayor of Honolulu from 1955 to 1969 as a member of the Hawaii Republican Party. As chief executive of the City and County of Honolulu, Hawaii, he oversaw one of the largest construction booms in city and county history, working closely with Governor of Hawaii John A. Burns. Blaisdell was the sitting mayor when Hawaii became the 50th U.S. state on August 21, 1959.

== Early life ==
Blaisdell was born in Honolulu and had European and Hawaiian ancestry. His father was William Wallace Blaisdell II, who served as fire chief of Honolulu; and his mother was Maliaka "Malie" Alaneao Merseberg. A maternal great-grandfather was John Adams Cummins. A paternal great-grandfather, John Blaisdell (1812–1889), came to the Hawaiian Islands from Maine in 1849.

== Education and athletics ==
Known as "Rusty", Blaisdell played basketball, football and baseball at Saint Louis School. He attended the University of Hawaiʻi at Mānoa and later transferred to Bucknell University in Lewisburg, Pennsylvania, where he was quarterback of the school's football team, graduating in 1926. He was also a member of the Sigma Chi fraternity. He received Bucknell's Alumni Award for Meritorious Achievement in 1968. Although Blaisdell also played basketball and baseball, he was inducted into the Bucknell Athletic Hall of Fame in 1988 in the football category. He was also a golfer, and started his day with push-ups. He returned to Honolulu to become a teacher, high school coach and athletic director.

== Public service ==
Blaisdell was elected representative of the 4th district to the legislature of the Territory of Hawaii in 1945, and the territorial senate in 1947 and 1949. In 1950 he ran for Mayor of Honolulu, but withdrew after suffering from tuberculosis.

Blaisdell ran against Frank Fasi and was elected in 1954, taking office in 1955. As mayor, he oversaw the construction of the John H. Wilson Tunnels through the Koʻolau Range from Kalihi Valley; and erected the Hawaii International Center, a multipurpose complex with a concert hall, convention center, exhibition hall and sports arena. After Blaisdell's death, his successor, Fasi, renamed the complex in Blaisdell's honor; is now known as the Neal S. Blaisdell Center.

From 1965 to 1966, Blaisdell was president of the United States Conference of Mayors.

== Death and legacy ==
Blaisdell married Lucy Thurston on October 23, 1926. Their daughter Velma Blaisdell Clark married James Kalaeone Clark and was a teacher for the Hawai`i State Department of Education. Their daughter Marilyn Blaisdell Ane married another football coach and taught at Punahou School for 28 years.

Blaisdell suffered a stroke while doing yard work and died on November 5, 1975, one day shy of his 73rd birthday. He is buried at Oahu Cemetery.

A park of 25.9 acres (10.5 ha) on the shore of Pearl Harbor (at 21°23′11″N 157°57′17″W) was named for him.

Political offices
| Preceded by John H. Wilson | Mayor of Honolulu; 1955 – 1968 | Succeeded by Frank Fasi |
