= Lester Petrie =

American politician

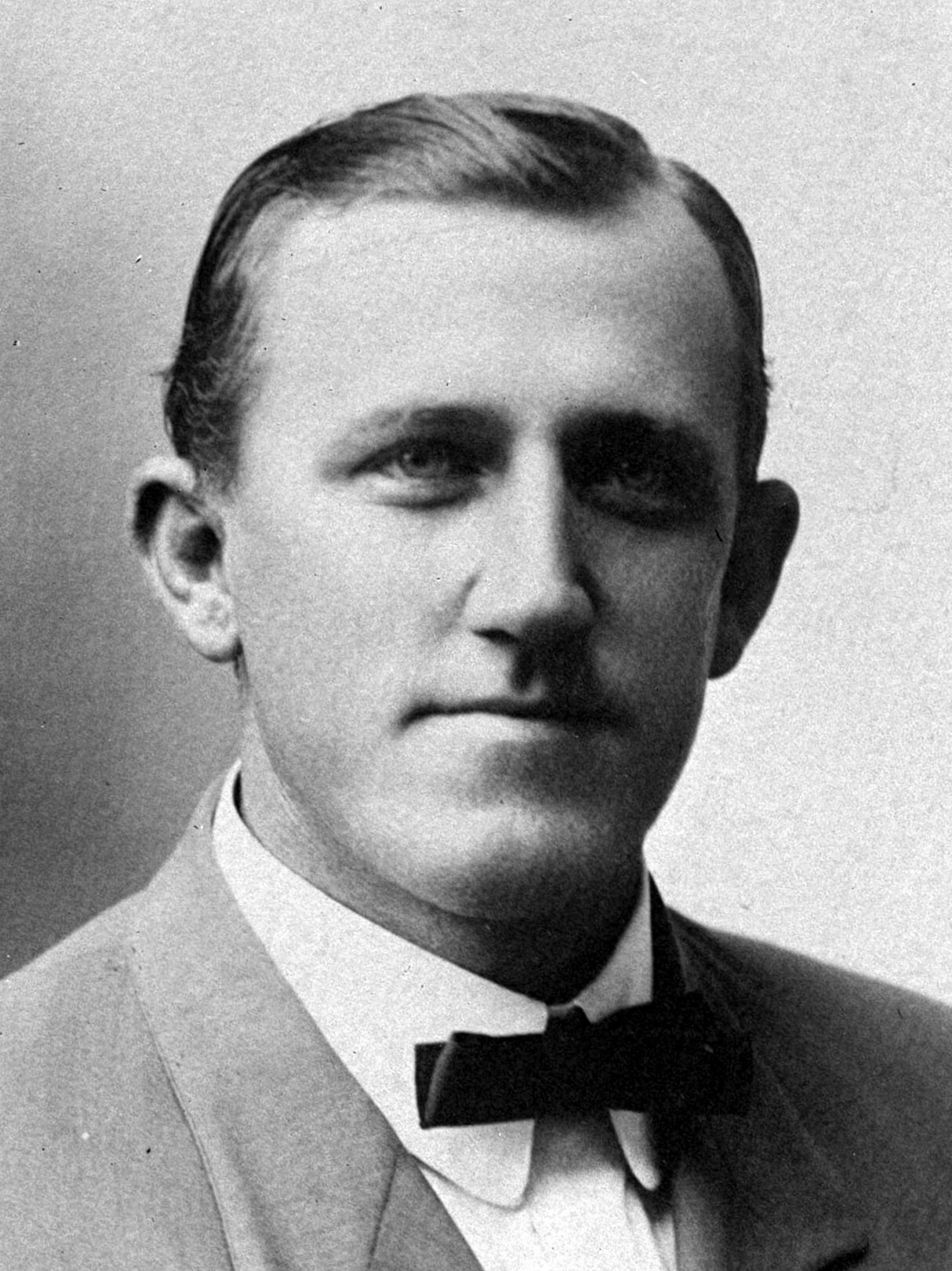

7th Mayor of City & County of Honolulu
- In office January 2, 1941 – January 2, 1949
- Preceded by: Charles Crane
- Succeeded by: John H. Wilson

Personal details
- Born: 1878
- Died: 1956 (aged 77–78)
- Party: Democratic

Lester Petrie (1878–1956) was an American politician and Mayor of Honolulu from 1941 to 1947, including when the city was attacked on December 7, 1941, by the Japanese military.

Preceded by Charles Crane	Mayor of Honolulu; 1941–1947	Succeeded by John H. Wilson
