= John H. Wilson (Hawaii politician) =

American politician (1871–1956)

John Henry Wilson
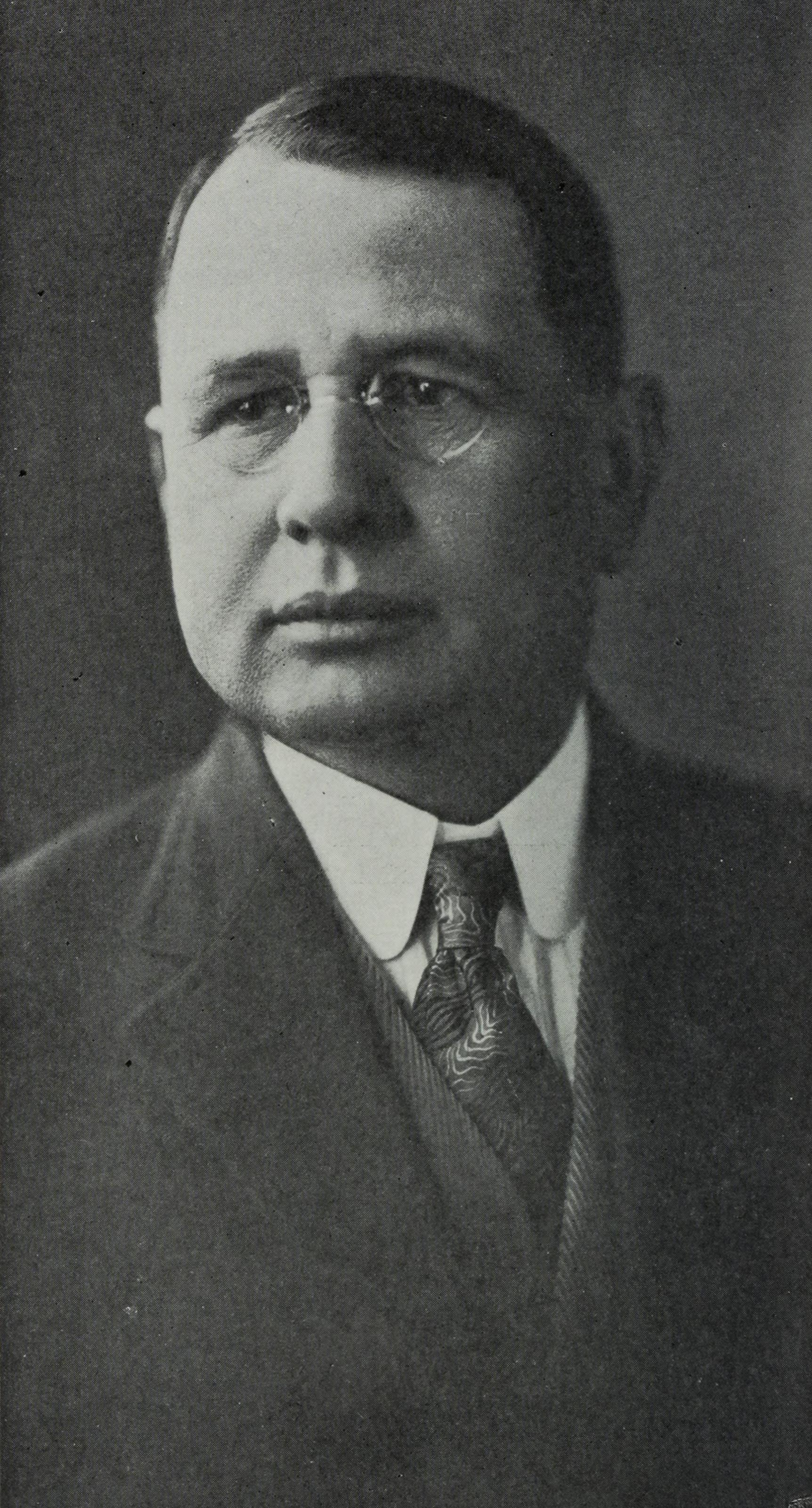

3rd Mayor of City & County of Honolulu
- In office February 26, 1920 – January 2, 1927
- Preceded by: Joseph J. Fern
- Succeeded by: Charles Arnold
- In office January 1, 1929 – January 3, 1931
- Preceded by: Charles Arnold
- Succeeded by: George F. Wright
- In office January 2, 1949 – January 2, 1955
- Preceded by: Lester Petrie
- Succeeded by: Neal Blaisdell

Personal details
- Born: December 15, 1871 Honolulu, Kingdom of Hawaii
- Died: July 3, 1956 (aged 84) Honolulu, Territory of Hawaii (now State of Hawaii)
- Party: Democratic
- Spouse: Ana Kuululani
- Parent: C. B. Wilson (father)
- Education: Stanford University
- Occupation: Civil Engineer, civil servant
- Known for: Founder of the Democratic Party of Hawaii

Military service
- Allegiance: Kingdom of Hawaii
- Branch/service: Royalist Insurgency
- Unit: Maui detachment
- Battles/wars: Uprising of 1895

John Henry Wilson (December 15, 1871 – July 3, 1956), nicknamed Johnny Wilson, was an American Hawaiian civil engineer, insurgent, co-founder of the Democratic Party of Hawaii, and Mayor of Honolulu, Hawaii three times: from 1920 to 1927, from 1929 to 1931, and from 1946 to 1954.

== Early years ==
Wilson was born in Honolulu, Hawaii in 1871. His father was Charles B. Wilson (1850–1926), whose ethnic background was Scottish and Tahitian. C.B. Wilson was superintendent of the water works and fire chief under King Kalākaua, and was Marshal of the Kingdom under Queen Liliʻuokalani. His mother was three quarters of European descent and one quarter Native Hawaiian, Eveline M. "Kitty or Kittie" Townsend, granddaughter of Captain Henry Blanchard of the ship Thaddeus which had brought the first missionaries of the American Board of Commissioners for Foreign Missions to Hawaii in 1820.

Wilson attended the Fort Street School and St. Alban's College. After graduating, he worked odd jobs on the West Coast, Hawaii, and Alaska. A construction job that he took in 1890 with Oahu Railway & Land led him to pursue civil engineering as a career. With financial support from the Queen, he enrolled at Stanford University in 1891. However, lack of funds after the overthrow of the monarchy in 1893 forced him to leave Stanford in 1894. While on the mainland he was approached by revolutionaries looking for suppliers for the 1895 Counter-Revolution in Hawaii, and attempt to restore the monarchy. He took part in the smuggling of guns and ammunition to Maui as part of the arms buildup by rebel forces. After the failed revolution he spoke little about his role in fearing he would be arrested for treason. He admitted he smuggled guns and was of rank to participate in planning his mission. He planned to land a ship of insurgents from Maui to attack Honolulu, but was the mission was aborted after the revolution was exposed and martial law was activated.

In 1896 he once again joined Oahu Railway & Land and worked on a survey for a carriage road over the Nuʻuanu Pali. Armed with this knowledge, he and fellow Stanford student Louis Whitehouse bid for and won the contract to build the road, completing the road in January 1898.

== Political career ==
Wilson served as roads engineer for both Maui and Honolulu counties. He was in a meeting on April 30, 1900 that organized the Democratic Party of Hawaii. He married hula practitioner Kini Kapahu on May 8, 1909. They moved to Molokaʻi and lived in the Pelekunu Valley before returning to Honolulu in 1919.

His first political campaign was for a seat in the Territorial Senate in 1918, which he lost. However, upon the death of Mayor Joseph J. Fern in 1920, Wilson was selected by the Board of Supervisors to succeed him.

Wilson served three times as mayor, from 1920 to 1927, 1929 to 1931, and from 1946 to 1954, a total of 19 years. As mayor, Wilson oversaw the completion of Honolulu Hale, which was completed in 1929 and consolidated the functions of the city's government. He also served on some territorial commissions, including coordinating the state holiday, Kamehameha Day, until 1956.

Following World War II Wilson considered retirement he had been de facto leader of the Democratic Party of the original five founders only two remained. David Kawānanakoa died in 1908, John S. McGrew died in 1911, and Charles J. McCarthy died in 1929. Delbert E. Metzger was a Federal Judge and powerful Democrat but his judicial career reduced his participation in politics this left Wilson as leader. Wilson preferred to leave the party in good hands. An ambitious detective named John A. Burns emerged as a successor Wilson could pass the torch to.

In his 80s, Wilson was once again a revolutionary as a key member of a nonviolent revolution called the Democratic Revolution of 1954 that brought his party to power. The early Democrats held a dislike toward Asian-Americans as threats to Hawaiians and the social demographics of Hawaii. But unlike his colleagues, Wilson himself an early Democrat and part-Hawaiian, allowed passage of 442nd veterans into the party, such as Daniel Inouye and Spark Matsunaga. He lived long enough to see the party that had overthrown the monarchy be dethroned themselves, and to some extent accomplishing what he failed in 1895. During this turbulent time Democrats were divided between right-wing "Walkouts" led by Ingram Stainback and the left-wing "Standpats" led by Burns, Wilson was a Standpat. A damaging letter written by Wilson criticizing non-Hawaii-born Democrats alluding to Stainback was considered the major factor in his loss to Republican Neal Blaisdell.

During the late 1950s, Wilson advocated that the territorial government build a tunnel through the Koʻolau Mountains from Honolulu to Kaneohe through Kalihi Valley. The territorial government, however, opted to build the tunnel through the Nuʻuanu Pali. The city eventually proceeded with plans to build a second set of tunnels through Kalihi Valley, which opened in 1961, five years after Wilson's death. The tunnels were named the John H. Wilson Tunnels in his honor.

Preceded by Joseph J. Fern	Mayor of Honolulu; 1920 – 1927	Succeeded by Charles Arnold
Preceded by Charles Arnold	Mayor of Honolulu; 1929 – 1931	Succeeded by George F. Wright
Preceded by Lester Petrie	Mayor of Honolulu; 1947–1955	Succeeded by Neal Blaisdell
