= Charles N. Arnold =

American politician

Charles Neal Arnold
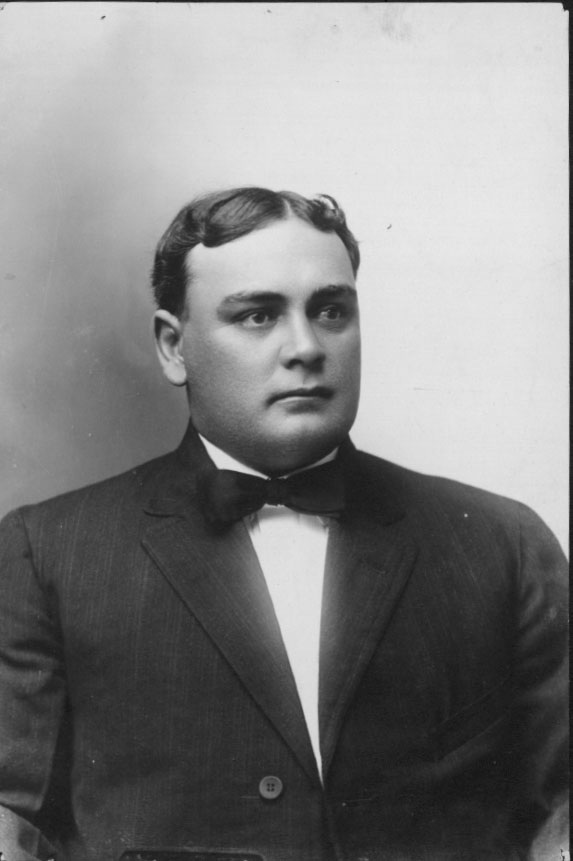

3rd Mayor of City & County of Honolulu
- In office January 2, 1927 – January 1, 1929
- Preceded by: John H. Wilson
- Succeeded by: John H. Wilson

Personal details
- Born: May 18, 1880 ʻŌʻōkala, Kingdom of Hawaiʻi
- Died: October 28, 1929 (aged 49)
- Party: Republican
- Spouses: Charlotte K. Taylor (died 1916) Julia Kanaana Colburn (m. 1918)
- Children: 12

Charles Neal Arnold (May 18, 1880 – October 28, 1929) was the Mayor of Honolulu from January 2, 1927, to January 1, 1929. He was a Republican.

== Background ==
Arnold was born in ʻŌʻōkala, Kingdom of Hawai'i of Native Hawaiian and European descent. ʻŌʻōkala is an unincorporated community near Hilo. The family relocated to Honolulu, and he worked temporarily for the Honolulu Bicycle, the California Feed Company. His long-term career spanned 27 years with the Honolulu Plantation Company in Aiea, Hawaii. He served on the Board of Supervisors of Oʻahu County, a governing body created during the Territory of Hawaii. He retired from the sugar plantation only after he became Mayor of Honolulu.

During World War I, he joined the military. He was stationed in Aiea, Schofield Barracks and Fort Armstrong. World War I ended November 11, 1918, and Arnold received an honorable discharge on February 3, 1919.

== Personal life ==
Arnold was married twice and had 12 children. He had 6 children with Charlotte K. Taylor who died in 1916. Children by that marriage were Charles Jr., Alfred, William, Cecelia, Lillian Louise and Arthur. In 1918, he married Julia Kanaana Colburn, daughter of John F. Colburn and Julia Naoho. Together, they also had 6 children - Shafter, June, Alice, Yvonne, Francis and Thomas.

Political offices
Preceded by John H. Wilson	Mayor of Honolulu; 1927–1929	Succeeded by John H. Wilson
