= Kini Kapahu Wilson =

Hawaiian hula dancer, musician, and singer

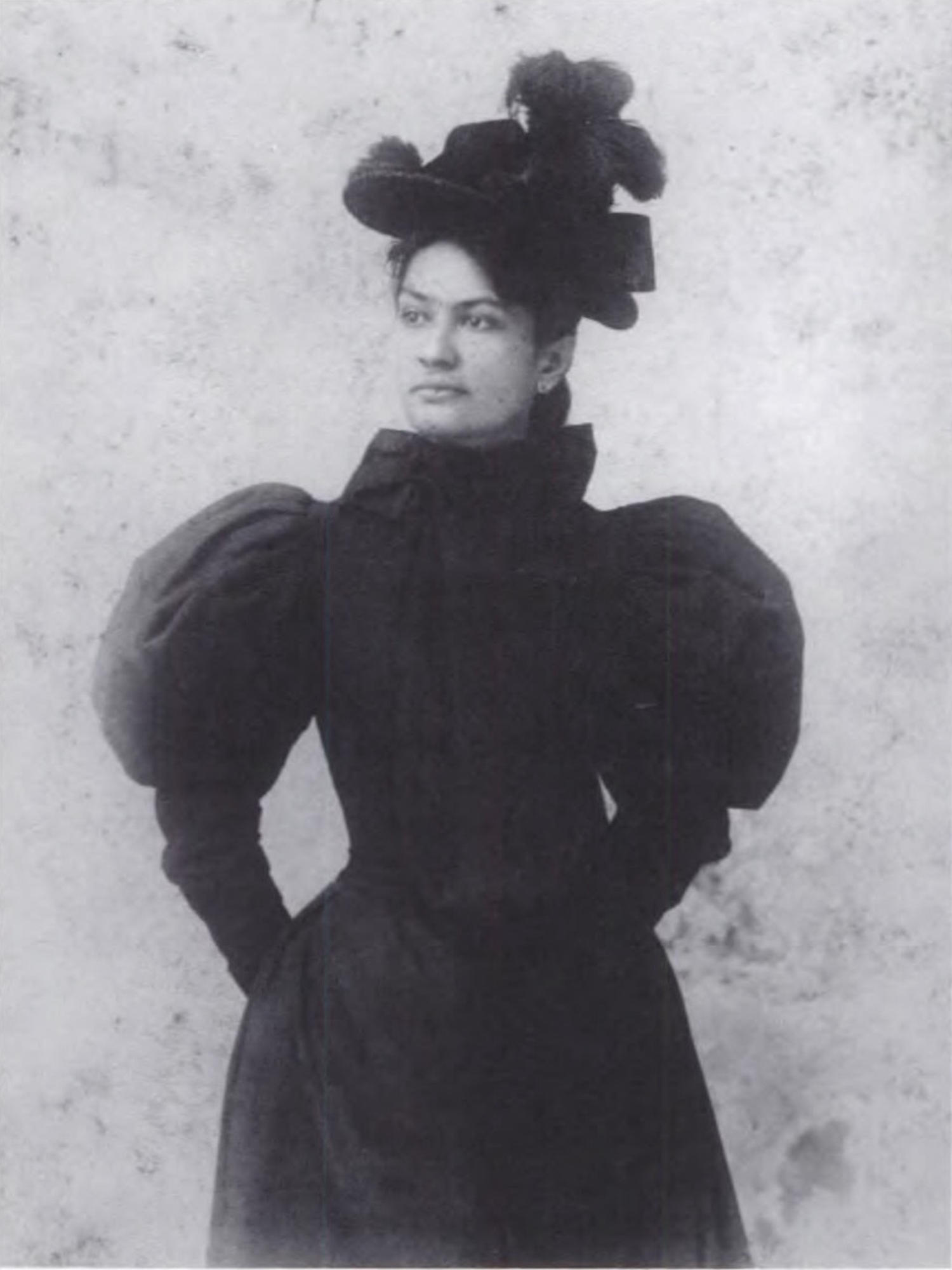
- Kini Kapahu, c. 1895
- Born: Ana Kini Kuululani; March 4, 1872; Honolulu, Kingdom of Hawaiʻi
- Died: July 24, 1962 (aged 90); Honolulu, State of Hawaiʻi
- Other name: Ana Kini Kapahukulaokamāmalu Kuululani McColgan Huhu
- Occupation: Hula dancer
- Spouse: John H. Wilson

Kini Kapahu Wilson (March 4, 1872 – July 24, 1962) was a Hawaiian hula dancer, musician, and singer. In 1893–94, she toured the United States, Europe and Russia, performing for heads of state such as Kaiser Wilhelm II and Tsar Nicholas II. She married Honolulu Mayor John H. Wilson and was recognized as the "Honorary First Lady" of Hawaii.

== Early life ==
Ana Kini Kapahukulaokamāmalu Kuululani McColgan Huhu was born in Honolulu on March 4, 1872, the fourteenth child of Hawaiian Kalaʻiolele and Irish tailor and sugarcane plantation owner John C. McColgan. She became the hānai daughter of Kapahukulaokamāmalu, a stranger who had passed by and assisted her mother in her birth. Because Kapahukulaokamāmalu and her husband Kuʻula were childless, Kalaiolele gave her daughter in hānai to the couple. She was called Kini Kapahu after her hānai mother. She grew up next door to King Kalākaua and attended school for just three years. She learned to dance the hula from her mother, a court dancer, and chanter. When she was 14, the King invited her to join the court's hula dancer troupe, Hui Lei Mamo. Although Kapahukulaokamāmalu opposed the public performance of the dance at the time, Queen Kapiʻolani later convinced her to give her permission when Kini was 16. She was one of seven dancers for the King and received training in Hawaiian dance, ballroom dance, singing and ukulele.

== Career ==
=== World dance tour ===
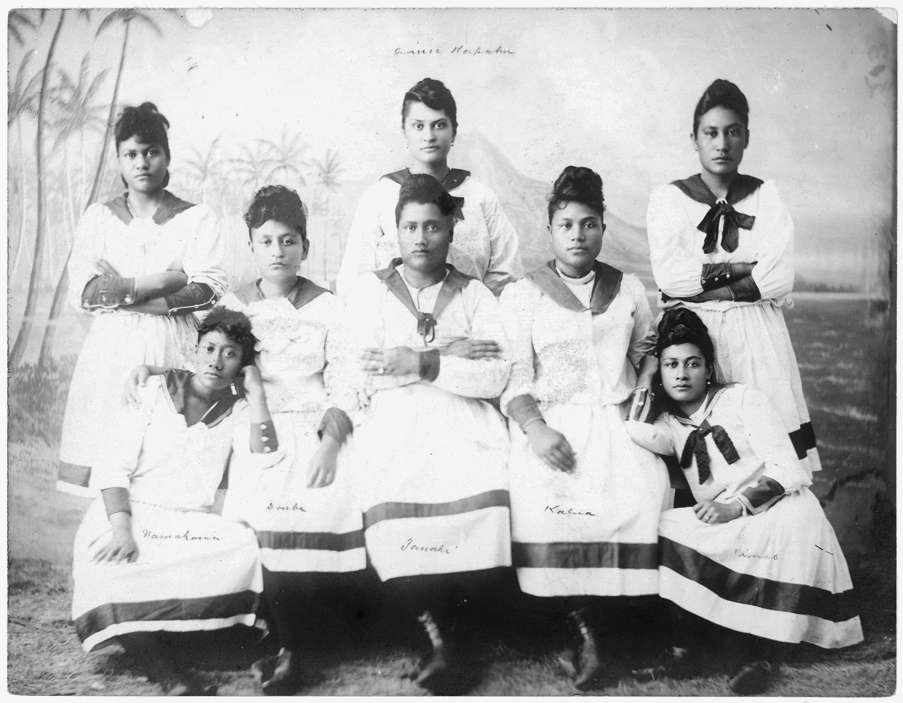
Kini Kapahu (standing center) with other members of Queen Liliuokalani's Hui Lei Mamo Singing Girls, 1894

Following the King's death in 1891, Kini learned Hawaiian dance from Kauaʻians Kapaona and Namakeʻelua. She learned the sacred, traditional forms hula pahu and hula ālaʻapapa. In 1893, she toured the United States, performing in San Francisco, in Portland, Oregon, and at the World's Columbian Exposition in Chicago. The following year she toured Europe, performing in Paris at the Folies Bergère, in Germany for Kaiser Wilhelm II and in Russia for Tsar Nicholas II. She returned to Chicago in 1895.

Kapahu was the member of touring Hawaiian dance troupes in the following years. She performed at the Trans-Mississippi Exposition in Omaha in 1898 and the Pan-American Exposition in Buffalo in 1901. She related that she invented the tī leaf skirt.

=== Marriage, suffrage and politics ===
Kapahu married engineer John H. Wilson on May 8, 1908. They moved to Molokaʻi and lived in the Pelekunu Valley where Kapahu farmed taro and was postmistress. They returned to Honolulu in 1919 where Wilson was elected Honolulu's mayor. Following the ratification of the Nineteenth Amendment, Kapahu organized a meeting for the territory's women to "discuss the new sphere of womanhood as created by the equal suffrage amendment." Thereafter she supported her husband's political career; he was reelected mayor and served as the territory's postmaster and administrator of Social Security and Public Welfare.

== Death and legacy ==
The Hawaii State Legislature designated Kapahu as "Honorary First Lady" after the admission to the union in 1959. In December 1960, Kapahu went to ʻIolani Palace to cast one of Hawaii's four electoral votes for that year's presidential election. She died on July 24, 1962, at the Queen's Hospital in Honolulu following a mild stroke, aged 90. She was buried beside her husband at Oahu Cemetery in the Nuʻuanu Valley. In March 2017, Hawaiʻi Magazine listed Kapahu among a list of the most influential women in Hawaiian history.
