= List of people from Visalia, California =

The following people were born in, or lived in Visalia, California.

- Matt Black - documentary photographer
- Donald Blessing - gold medal-winning rower and former owner of Oakland Raiders football team
- Scott-Vincent Borba - CEO of e.l.f.
- Linda Gist Calvin - 41st president general of the Daughters of the American Revolution
- Tex Clevenger - professional baseball player
- Tonya Cooley - reality television performer
- Shane Costa - professional baseball player
- Kevin Costner - actor and Oscar-winning director
- Tom B. Coughran - banker, soldier, and public servant
- El Daña - drag king
- Christopher "Chris" Evans (1847–1917) - outlaw who lived in Visalia prior to his arrest for train robbery and confinement to Folsom Prison
- Larry French - baseball player
- Chris Garcia - Stand up Comedian
- Cody Gibson - professional mixed martial artist competing in the Ultimate Fighting Championship organization
- Jerry Heard - professional golfer
- Aaron Hill - professional baseball player
- Tom Johnston - rock musician, singer, founding member of the Doobie Brothers
- Avi Kaplan - singer and songwriter, former and founding member of Pentatonix
- William Kettner - San Diego politician for whom Kettner Boulevard is named
- Ken Khachigian - chief speech writer for Ronald Reagan
- Mike LaCoss - professional baseball player
- Robert B. Laughlin - Nobel Prize-winning physicist
- DJ Lemahieu - professional baseball player
- Robert List - 24th governor of Nevada
- David Lombardi - sports journalist covering the San Francisco 49ers
- Jordan Luplow - baseball player
- Doug Marshall - mixed martial artist
- Monte Melkonian - Armenian military leader in the Nagorno-Karabakh War
- Beau Mills - professional baseball player
- Frank W. Mixter (1873–1947) - California state senator
- Don Mosebar - professional football player
- Rance Mulliniks - MLB player for the California Angels, Kansas City Royals, and Toronto Blue Jays
- Bob Ojeda - professional baseball player
- Marty Perez - professional baseball player
- Steve Perry - lead singer for the rock group Journey
- Shirley Shahan - retired NHRA Super Stock drag racer, nicknamed "Drag-On Lady"
- Jean Shepard - country music singer
- Liza Soberano - actress
- J. Curtis Struble - U.S. diplomat, ambassador to Peru
- Bob Talbot - baseball player
- Andrew Toti - inventor
- Stephen Vogt - manager of the Cleveland Guardians, former MLB catcher
- Marie Wilcox - Wukchumni dictionary creator
- Jim Wohlford - MLB player for the Kansas City Royals, Milwaukee Brewers, San Francisco Giants, and the Montreal Expos
- Betsy Wolfe - actress, singer and Broadway performer
- Edmond Edward Wysinger - Visalia pioneer (1862)
- Tyler Zeller - NBA player for the Brooklyn Nets
- Inde Navarrette - Actress
