= Kawakami (surname) =

Kawakami (written: 川上) is a Japanese surname. Notable people with the surname include:

- Bertha Kawakami (1931–2017), American educator and politician
- Bizan Kawakami (川上 眉山; 1869–1908), Japanese writer
- Gensai Kawakami (1834–1871), a famous samurai
- Hajime Kawakami (1879–1946), Japanese Marxist economist
- Hiromi Kawakami (born 1958), a Japanese author
- Juria Kawakami (born 1993), a Japanese singer
- Kenji Kawakami (born 1946), the inventor of Chindōgu
- Kenshin Kawakami (born 1975), a Japanese Major League Baseball pitcher
- Kikuko Kawakami (1904–1985), a Japanese novelist
- Kiyoshi Kawakami (nicknamed "Karl"; 1873–1949), a Japanese journalist and author
- Lynn Kawakami (born 2006), a Japanese singer, rapper and dancer, member of the K-pop group tripleS
- Masashi Kawakami (born 1972), a Japanese boxer
- Mieko Kawakami (born 1976), a Japanese singer and author
- Mine Kawakami (born 1969), Japanese pianist and composer
- Noriko Kawakami (川上 紀子), Japanese electrical engineer
- Otojirō Kawakami (1864–1911), a Japanese actor and theatrical manager
- Richard Kawakami (1931–1987), American politician
- Sadayakko Kawakami (1871–1946), a Japanese actress known professionally as Sada Yacco
- Saena Kawakami (born 1997), Japanese badminton player
- Shuta Kawakami (born 1998), Japanese Paralympic athlete
- Takeshi Kawakami (born 1972), a Japanese professional shogi player
- Tetsuharu Kawakami (1920–2013), Japanese baseball player "God of Batting/Hitting", and manager
- Tim Kawakami, American sports journalist
- Yoohei Kawakami (born 1982), a Japanese singer-songwriter and musician, leader of the band Alexandros

== Fictional characters ==
- Momoyo Kawakami and Kazuko Kawakami in Maji de Watashi ni Koi Shinasai! (Majikoi ~ Oh! Samurai Girls)
- Sadayo Kawakami in Persona 5
- Tomie Kawakami in Tomie
