= Vitousek =

Vitousek or Vitoušek is a Czech surname. Notable people with the surname include:

- Peter Vitousek (born 1949), American ecologist
- Roy A. Vitousek (1890–1946), member of the Hawaii Territorial House of Representatives
