= 30th Hawaii Territorial Legislature =

Session of the Hawaii Territorial Legislature

30th Hawaiʻi Territorial Legislature
←	29th	Constitution of Hawaii	→
- Seal of the Territory of Hawaii

Overview
- Legislative body: Hawaii Territorial Legislature
- Jurisdiction: Territory of Hawaii, United States

Senate
- Members: 25
- President: Herbert K. H. Lee
- Vice President: Matsuki Arashiro

House of Representatives
- Members: 51
- Speaker: Elmer F. Cravalho
- Vice Speaker: Hiram K. Kamaka

The Thirtieth Legislature of the Territory of Hawaii was the final session of the Hawaii Territorial Legislature. The session convened in Honolulu, Hawaii, and ran from February 18 until May 2, 1959. This was the first session to comprise 25 senators and 51 representatives, avoiding potential equal representation which occurred in the House of Representatives during the 24th Hawaii Territorial Legislature.

== Legislative session ==
The session ran from February 18 until May 2, 1959. It passed 279 bills into law.

== Senators ==
↓
16	9
Democratic	Republican

Affiliation	Party (Shading indicates majority caucus)			Total	
Affiliation	Democratic	Ind	Republican	Total	Vacant
End of previous legislature (1957)	12	0	3	15	0
Begin (1959)	16	0	9	25	0
Latest voting share	64%		36%		

District	Senator	Party	County
1	Kazuhisa Abe	D	Hawaiʻi
1	Nelson K. Doi	D	Hawaiʻi
1	William H. Hill	R	Hawaiʻi
1	Richard J. Lyman, Jr.	R	Hawaiʻi
1	Tom Okino	D	Hawaiʻi
2	Bernard G. Kinney	R	Hawaiʻi
2	Julian R. Yates, Sr.	R	Hawaiʻi
3	John G. Duarte	D	Maui
3	George Fukuoka	D	Maui
3	Herbert C. Jackson	R	Maui
3	Thomas S. Ogata	D	Maui
3	Nadao Yoshinaga	D	Maui
4	Daniel K. Inouye	D	Oahu
4	Mitsuyuki Kido	D	Oahu
4	Herbert K. H. Lee	D	Oahu
4	Oren E. Long	D	Oahu
4	Hebden Porteus	R	Oahu
5	George R. Ariyoshi	D	Oahu
5	Frank F. Fasi	D	Oahu
5	Patsy Takemoto Mink	D	Oahu
5	Sakae Takahashi	D	Oahu
5	Wilfred C Tsukiyama	R	Oahu
6	Matsuki Arashiro	D	Kauaʻi
6	Francis M. F. Ching	R	Kauaʻi
6	Noboru Miyake	R	Kauaʻi

== House of Representatives ==
↓
33	18
Democratic	Republican

Affiliation	Party (Shading indicates majority caucus)			Total	
Affiliation	Democratic	Ind	Republican	Total	Vacant
End of previous legislature (1957)	18	0	12	30	0
Begin (1959)	33	0	18	51	0
Latest voting share	64.7%		35.3%		

District	Representative	Party	County
1	Jack Katsumi Suwa	D	Hawaiʻi
2	Stafford L. Austin	R	Hawaiʻi
2	Joseph R. Garcia, Jr.	R	Hawaiʻi
2	Stanley Ikuo Hara	D	Hawaiʻi
2	Raymond M. Kobayashi	D	Hawaiʻi
3	Yoshito Takamine	D	Hawaiʻi
4	Takeshi Kudo	D	Hawaiʻi
5	Akoni Pule	D	Hawaiʻi
6 (Lānaʻi)	Pedro Dela Cruz	D	Maui
7	Ray F. Adams	D	Maui
7	Elmer F. Cravalho	D	Maui
7	John E. Milligan	R	Maui
7	Bernard Hiroshi Tokunaga	R	Maui
7	David K. Trask, Jr.	D	Maui
8	Albert Evenson (Note: Elected at special election held April 25, 1959, to fill vacancy caused by death of the Honorable Representative Samuel W. King, who was elected at general election held November 4, 1958.)	R	Oahu
8	Hiram K. Kamaka	D	Oahu
9	Yasutaka Fukushima	R	Oahu
9	John Lanham	D	Oahu
10	Bernaldo D. Bicoy	D	Oahu
10	George Makoto Okano	D	Oahu
11	Charles E. Kauhane	D	Oahu
11	Akira Sakima	D	Oahu
11	James H. Wakatsuki	D	Oahu
12	Clarence W. H. Fong	R	Oahu
12	Sidney I. Hashimoto	D	Oahu
12	Robert Eijin Teruya	R	Oahu
13	Sakae Amano	D	Oahu
13	Robert W. B. Chang	D	Oahu
13	Donald D. H. Ching	D	Oahu
14	Walter Harada	D	Oahu
14	Flora K. Hayes	R	Oahu
14	David C. McClung	D	Oahu
14	Howard Y. Miyake	D	Oahu
14	Wadsworth Yee	R	Oahu
15	Dorothy L. Devereux	R	Oahu
15	O. Vincent Esposito	D	Oahu
15	Thomas P. Gill	D	Oahu
15	J. Ward Russell	R	Oahu
15	James Yozo Shigemura	D	Oahu
15	J. Howard Worrall	R	Oahu
16	Tadao Beppu	D	Oahu
16	Walter Heen	D	Oahu
16	Hiroshi Kato	D	Oahu
16	Spark M. Matsunaga	D	Oahu
17	Webley Edwards	R	Oahu
17	Frank C. Judd	R	Oahu
17	Ambrose J. Rosehill	R	Oahu
18	Allan H. Ezell	D	Kauaʻi
18	Manuel S. Henriques	D	Kauaʻi
18	Clinton I. Shiraishi	R	Kauaʻi
18	Yoshiichi Yoshida	R	Kauaʻi
