= Representative Saiki =

Representative Saiki may refer to:

- Pat Saiki (1930–2026, US Representative
- Scott Saiki (born 1964), Hawaii state representative
