= Kawakami =

Kawakami may refer to:

== People ==
- Kawakami (surname)

== Places in Japan ==
- Kawakami District, Hokkaidō, a district in Hokkaidō
- In Okayama Prefecture,
  - Kawakami, Okayama (Kawakami) was a town in the former Kawakami District
  - Kawakami, Okayama (Maniwa) was a village in Maniwa District
- Kawakami, Nagano, a village in Nagano Prefecture
- Kawakami, Nara, a village in Nara Prefecture
- Kawaue, Gifu, a former village in Gifu Prefecture that is now part of the city of Nakatsugawa, Gifu, was written the same way as Kawakami (川上村).

== Other uses ==
- an Hydrangea aspera variety
