= Oregon–Stanford football rivalry =

American college football rivalry

- Oregon Ducks Stanford Cardinal
- First meeting: November 10, 1900; Stanford, 34–0
- Latest meeting: September 30, 2023; Oregon, 42–6
- Next meeting: TBD
- Trophy: None

Statistics
- Total meetings: 87
- All-time series: Stanford leads, 50–36–1
- Largest victory: Stanford, 49–7 (2017)
- Longest win streak: Stanford, 11 (1900–29)
- Current win streak: Oregon, 2 (2022–present)

Locations of Oregon and Stanford

The Oregon–Stanford football rivalry is an American college football rivalry game between the Oregon Ducks and Stanford Cardinal.

== History ==
The bordering state rivals were members of the same conference for much of their athletics histories, first the Pacific Coast Conference (PCC) from 1919 to 1958 then the various predecessors of the modern day Pac-12 Conference from 1959 to 2023. Since 1947, the teams have never gone more than three years without playing each other. The rivalry reached its peak in the 2010s, when Oregon was an established national power under head coach Chip Kelly and Stanford's program was rising under head coaches Jim Harbaugh and David Shaw.

Writing in The Athletic in September 2019, sportswriter David Lombardi called Stanford's 21–6 2019 season home loss to Oregon "the bleakest Cardinal showing against the Ducks since 2006." The touchdown-free defeat, which created the first three-game losing streak of the David Shaw era, stood in contrast to the 2010–15 seasons, when annual top-ten meetings between Oregon and Stanford helped shape the national championship race. Lombardi pointed out that in their 2019 matchup Stanford's front seven players successfully held Oregon to a small number of yards per carry and logged four sacks. However, repeated offensive miscues, busted coverages and an injury-hampered game from quarterback K. J. Costello signalled a broader erosion of the Cardinal's once-dominant power style.

When Oregon left the Pac-12 for the Big Ten Conference and Stanford left for the Atlantic Coast Conference (ACC) in 2024, the rivalry between the Ducks and Cardinal was rendered dormant for the time being. As of June 2025, there are no plans for the schools to meet again on the football field.

== Analysis ==
A 2018 Bleacher Report article by Jeff Bell profiling the rivalry stated that the Stanford–Oregon series has quietly become one of college football's premier showdowns. The article emphasizes that early-2010s top-5 clashes routinely decided the Pac-12 race and influenced the national NCAA title hunt. It added that the rivalry's appeal in the 2010s came from the two team's then contrasting styles, Stanford's bruising defence against Oregon's high-speed offense, and a run of dramatic upsets that made the matchup desired viewing far beyond the West Coast.

Another commentator noted in 2022 that Oregon and Stanford "grew into the premier Pac-10 (and then Pac-12) rivalry commensurate with USC's decline as the 2000s gave way to the 2010s" and that "Marked by classic contests with conference, and sometimes national championship implications, the Ducks and Cardinal defined football out West." Further, he stated "a reminder that even if it’s a relatively new rivalry, the stakes increase when these teams get together."

Zachary Neel had noted, in a 2023 USA Today piece, that the rivalry “may not get the respect that others do in the conference, but it undoubtedly has played as big of an impact on the outcome of the league as any other over the years.” Neel specifically highlights the 2007, 2009, 2010, 2011, 2012, 2013, 2014, 2015, 2018 and 2021 editions as the most memorable matchups between the two teams and separately analyses why he picks each one.

== Game results ==
Oregon victories	Stanford victories	Tie games

No.	Date	Location	Winning team		Losing team	
1	November 10, 1900	Stanford, CA	Stanford	34	Oregon	0
2	October 29, 1904	Stanford, CA	Stanford	35	Oregon	0
3	October 17, 1905	Stanford, CA	Stanford	10	Oregon	4
4	October 30, 1920	Stanford, CA	Stanford	10	Oregon	0
5	November 10, 1923	Eugene, OR	Stanford	14	Oregon	3
6	October 18, 1924	Stanford, CA	Stanford	28	Oregon	13
7	October 31, 1925	Stanford, CA	Stanford	35	Oregon	13
8	October 23, 1926	Eugene, OR	Stanford	29	Oregon	12
9	October 29, 1927	Stanford, CA	Stanford	19	Oregon	0
10	October 6, 1928	Eugene, OR	Stanford	26	Oregon	12
11	October 5, 1929	Stanford, CA	Stanford	33	Oregon	7
12	October 10, 1936	Stanford, CA	Tie	7	Tie	7
13	October 2, 1937	Eugene, OR	Oregon	7	Stanford	6
14	October 15, 1938	Stanford, CA	Stanford	27	Oregon	16
15	October 7, 1939	Portland, OR	Oregon	10	Stanford	0
16	October 5, 1940	Stanford, CA	Stanford	13	Oregon	0
17	September 27, 1941	Stanford, CA	Stanford	19	Oregon	15
18	November 15, 1947	Stanford, CA	Oregon	21	Stanford	6
19	September 25, 1948	Stanford, CA	Oregon	20	Stanford	12
20	September 22, 1951	Portland, OR	Stanford	27	Oregon	20
21	November 15, 1952	Stanford, CA	Oregon	21	Stanford	20
22	September 26, 1953	Stanford, CA	Stanford	7	Oregon	0
23	September 25, 1954	Portland, OR	Stanford	18	No. 16 Oregon	13
24	November 12, 1955	Stanford, CA	Stanford	44	Oregon	7
25	October 20, 1956	Eugene, OR	Stanford	21	Oregon	7
26	November 2, 1957	Stanford, CA	No. 15 Oregon	27	Stanford	26
27	November 8, 1958	Eugene, OR	Oregon	12	Stanford	0
28	September 19, 1959	Stanford, CA	Oregon	28	Stanford	27
29	November 5, 1960	Portland, OR	Oregon	27	Stanford	6
30	November 4, 1961	Stanford, CA	Oregon	19	Stanford	7
31	November 3, 1962	Portland, OR	Oregon	28	Stanford	14
32	September 28, 1963	Stanford, CA	Oregon	36	Stanford	7
33	October 31, 1964	Portland, OR	Stanford	10	No. 7 Oregon	8
34	October 9, 1965	Stanford, CA	Stanford	17	Oregon	14
35	October 8, 1966	Portland, OR	Oregon	7	Stanford	3
36	November 11, 1967	Stanford, CA	Stanford	17	Oregon	14
37	September 28, 1968	Eugene, OR	Stanford	28	Oregon	12
38	September 27, 1969	Stanford, CA	Stanford	28	Oregon	0
39	September 26, 1970	Eugene, OR	No. 3 Stanford	33	Oregon	10
40	September 25, 1971	Stanford, CA	No. 13 Stanford	38	Oregon	17
41	October 21, 1972	Eugene, OR	Oregon	15	No. 13 Stanford	13
42	November 17, 1973	Stanford, CA	Stanford	24	Oregon	7
43	November 16, 1974	Eugene, OR	Stanford	17	Oregon	0
44	November 15, 1975	Stanford, CA	Stanford	33	Oregon	30

No.	Date	Location	Winning team		Losing team	
45	November 13, 1976	Eugene, OR	Stanford	28	Oregon	17
46	October 1, 1977	Stanford, CA	Stanford	20	Oregon	10
47	November 10, 1979	Stanford, CA	Oregon	16	Stanford	7
48	September 6, 1980	Eugene, OR	Stanford	35	Oregon	25
49	November 14, 1981	Stanford, CA	Stanford	42	Oregon	3
50	November 12, 1983	Stanford, CA	Oregon	16	Stanford	7
51	September 21, 1985	Eugene, OR	Oregon	45	Stanford	28
52	October 18, 1986	Eugene, OR	Stanford	41	Oregon	7
53	October 24, 1987	Stanford, CA	Stanford	13	Oregon	10
54	September 24, 1988	Eugene, OR	Oregon	7	Stanford	3
55	September 23, 1989	Stanford, CA	Stanford	18	No. 22 Oregon	17
56	October 27, 1990	Eugene, OR	No. 25 Oregon	31	Stanford	0
57	November 2, 1991	Eugene, OR	Stanford	33	Oregon	13
58	September 12, 1992	Stanford, CA	No. 21 Stanford	21	Oregon	7
59	November 13, 1993	Eugene, OR	Stanford	38	Oregon	34
60	November 12, 1994	Stanford, CA	No. 15 Oregon	55	Stanford	21
61	September 23, 1995	Eugene, OR	Stanford	28	No. 12 Oregon	21
62	October 12, 1996	Stanford, CA	Stanford	27	Oregon	24^{OT}
63	September 27, 1997	Stanford, CA	No. 20 Stanford	58	Oregon	49
64	September 26, 1998	Eugene, OR	No. 20 Oregon	63	Stanford	28
65	October 20, 2001	Eugene, OR	Stanford	49	No. 5 Oregon	42
66	November 2, 2002	Eugene, OR	No. 19 Oregon	41	Stanford	14
67	October 25, 2003	Eugene, OR	Oregon	35	Stanford	0
68	October 23, 2004	Stanford, CA	Oregon	16	Stanford	13
69	October 1, 2005	Stanford, CA	Oregon	44	Stanford	20
70	September 2, 2006	Eugene, OR	No. 21 Oregon	48	Stanford	10
71	September 22, 2007	Stanford, CA	No. 13 Oregon	55	Stanford	31
72	November 8, 2008	Eugene, OR	Oregon	35	Stanford	28
73	November 7, 2009	Stanford, CA	Stanford	51	No. 8 Oregon	42
74	October 2, 2010	Eugene, OR	No. 4 Oregon	52	No. 9 Stanford	31
75	November 12, 2011	Stanford, CA	No. 6 Oregon	53	No. 3 Stanford	30
76	November 17, 2012	Eugene, OR	No. 14 Stanford	17	No. 1 Oregon	14^{OT}
77	November 7, 2013	Stanford, CA	No. 6 Stanford	26	No. 2 Oregon	20
78	November 1, 2014	Eugene, OR	No. 5 Oregon	45	Stanford	16
79	November 14, 2015	Stanford, CA	Oregon	38	No. 7 Stanford	36
80	November 12, 2016	Eugene, OR	Stanford	52	Oregon	27
81	October 14, 2017	Stanford, CA	No. 23 Stanford	49	Oregon	7
82	September 22, 2018	Eugene, OR	No. 7 Stanford	38	No. 20 Oregon	31^{OT}
83	September 21, 2019	Stanford, CA	No. 16 Oregon	21	Stanford	6
84	November 7, 2020	Eugene, OR	No. 12 Oregon	35	Stanford	14
85	October 2, 2021	Stanford, CA	Stanford	31	No. 3 Oregon	24^{OT}
86	October 1, 2022	Eugene, OR	No. 13 Oregon	45	Stanford	27
87	September 30, 2023	Stanford, CA	No. 9 Oregon	42	Stanford	6
Series: Stanford leads 50–36–1

Game results sources:

== See also ==
- List of NCAA college football rivalry games
