= Daniel J. Kihano =

American businessman and politician

Daniel Kihano

6th Speaker of the Hawaii House of Representatives
- In office 1987–1992
- Preceded by: Richard Kawakami; Emilio Alcon (acting)
- Succeeded by: Joseph M. Souki

Member of the Hawaii House of Representatives from the 11th district 20th (1970–1982) 40th (1982–1984)
- In office 1970–1992
- Succeeded by: Redistricted

Personal details
- Born: March 16, 1933 Waipahu, Hawaii, U.S.
- Died: January 26, 2000 (aged 66) ʻEwa Beach, Hawaii, U.S.
- Party: Democratic
- Spouse: JoAnn
- Children: 6

Daniel James "Danny" Kihano (March 16, 1933 – January 26, 2000) was an American businessman and politician.

Born in Waipahu, Hawaii, Kihano went to Waipahu High School and Honolulu Business College. He also went to Leeward Community College. Kihano owned Danny Kihano Insurance Agency. From 1970 to 1992, Kihano served in the Hawaii House of Representatives and was a Democrat. He served as speaker of the house in 1987, 1989, and 1991. In 1997, Kihano was convicted in the United States District of wire and mail fraud, and money laundering. However, Kihano was ordered released from federal prison in May 1999 because of poor health. Kihano died in Honolulu, Hawaii.
