= Amy Perruso =

American politician (born 1968)

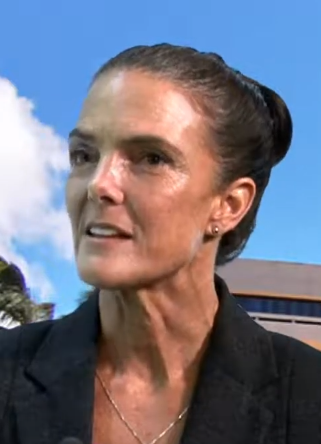
- Perruso in 2019

Member of the Hawaii House of Representatives from the 46th district
- Incumbent
- Assumed office November 6, 2018
- Preceded by: Lei Learmont

Personal details
- Born: November 5, 1968 (age 58) Fallbrook, California, U.S.
- Party: Democratic
- Domestic partner: John Mackey
- Children: 2
- Education: University of Southern California(BA); University of Hawaiʻi at Mānoa(PhD)
- Occupation: Politician; teacher
- Website: Campaign website

Amy Anastasia Perruso (born November 5, 1968) is an American politician and educator serving as a member of the Hawaii House of Representatives for the 46th district. She represents the 46th House District as a member of the Democratic Party.

== Early life and education ==
Perruso was born and raised in Fallbrook, California. She earned a Bachelor of Arts degree in political science from the University of Southern California in 1990 and studied at the University of Helsinki as a Fulbright Scholar. She took courses toward a doctorate at the University of California, Los Angeles and earned her teaching credential from the University of Hawaiʻi at Mānoa. She earned a PhD in political science and government from the University of Hawaiʻi at Mānoa.

== Career ==
As a result of the education workers' strike, Perruso was one of several teachers to seek election to the Hawaii State Legislature. Perruso, a former secretary-treasurer of the Hawaii State Teachers Association who taught social studies at Mililani High School, defeated the incumbent Democratic representative Lei Learmont in the primaries. Perruso then went on to collect twice as many votes as her Republican opponent, John E. Miller, in the race for the 46th District.

In March 2020, Perruso joined Tina Wildberger and Russell Ruderman in donating $4,000 from their raises as state legislators to help pay for school lunches in their district. In 2021, she became an inaugural member of the newly-formed Progressive Legislative Caucus of the House of Representatives, a coalition of 18 left-wing members of the body.

In 2018 her candidacy was endorsed by the Democratic Socialists of America. In March 2019, she and other DSA elected officials congratulated striking teachers across the United States.

== Personal life ==
She is married to John Mackey and has two children.

== See also ==
- List of Democratic Socialists of America who have held office in the United States
