= Roy A. Vitousek =

American politician

Royal "Roy" Arnold Vitousek, (May 6, 1890 – April 3, 1947) — was a member of the Hawaii Territorial House of Representatives from 1922 to 1944. He was Speaker of the House from 1931–1932, 1935–1940, and 1943-1944.

== Personal life ==
Vitousek was born in Sissons, CA to Frank and Luella (Arnold) Vitousek. He attended public schools in Healdsburg, CA and graduated from the University of California, Berkeley in 1912. While in college, he was a member of the Pirates' Club and lettered in track. When the Pirates' Club became a chapter of Sigma Pi fraternity the year after his graduation he was one of the first alumni to be initiated into the national organization.

After college he became the city clerk of Healdsburg and had a law practice on the side. He married his wife, the former Juanita Judy, in 1914 and moved to Hawaii in 1917. From 1919 to 1921 he was the city and county attorney for Honolulu He also coached a high school track team in his spare time.

During this time he became a partner in the law firm of Stanley, Vitousek, Pratt, & Winn.

== Politics ==
Vitousek was elected as a Republican to the Hawaii Territorial House of Representatives from 1922-1944. During that time he served as Speaker of the House three times. He was a delegate to the 1940 Republican National Convention for the territory where he was a member of the Resolutions Committee. He also served as the Hawaii Territory Republican Party chair from 1944 until his death.

While in office he worked as Chairman of the Commission on Crime was highly praised. He worked continuously for the cause of Hawaii statehood and sponsored important legislation in the areas of civil service, labor relations, police organization, workmen's compensation, unemployment compensation, and public welfare.

== Pearl Harbor attack ==
Vitousek was caught in the air on a joy ride with his seventeen-year-old son, Martin, during the attack on Pearl Harbor. He was flying an Aeronica when a passing Japanese fighter plane took a shot at them. After about ten minutes of trying to avoid Japanese aircraft they were able to land at John Rodgers Airport amid exploding bombs. Once on the ground they found a dead man (Robert Tyce) and two passenger planes that had been shot up.

The Vitouseks were fortunate. Of the eight civilian pilots in the air that day, three were shot down of which two died. One was forced to bail out. Two landed safely. Two pilots went missing and are presumed dead.

After the attack was over, Vitousek was sworn in as an assistant police captain to help organize the city.

== Family ==
Vitousek's wife, Juanita was a painter best known for her watercolors. They had three children: Frederica Vitousek Carah; Roy A. Vitousek Jr., an attorney; and Martin Judy Vitousek, a geophysicist and researcher. Two of their grandsons are Roy (Randy) Vitousek III and Peter Vitousek.

Vitousek died suddenly on April 3, 1947 from coronary thrombosis.
