= Kim Coco Iwamoto =

American politician (born 1968)

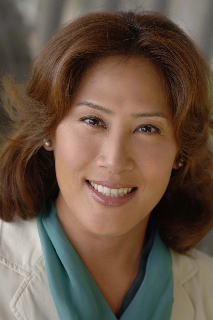
- Iwamoto in 2009

Member of the Hawaii House of Representatives from the 25 district
- Incumbent
- Assumed office November 5, 2024
- Preceded by: Scott Saiki

Personal details
- Born: May 26, 1968 (age 58) Kauai, Hawaii, U.S.
- Party: Democratic
- Education: Fashion Institute of Technology (AA); San Francisco State University (BA); University of New Mexico (JD)

Kim Coco Iwamoto (born May 26, 1968) is an American politician from Hawaii and member of the Hawaii House of Representatives. Iwamoto is the first transgender state legislator in Hawaii history. (Note: No Republican candidate contested her seat.) She was also one of the Democratic primary candidates for the position of Lieutenant Governor of Hawaii in the 2018 election. She previously served as a commissioner on the Hawaii Civil Rights Commission and was elected to serve two terms on the Hawaii Board of Education before winning her state house seat in 2024, unseating then-House Speaker Scott Saiki in the Democratic primary. Iwamoto had previously run against Saiki in 2020 and 2022, losing by a slim margin both times.

Iwamoto was recognized as a Champion of Change by President Barack Obama in 2013 and in 2018, Newsweek listed her as one of fifty need-to-know pioneers for LGBTQ rights.

In September 2024, Iwamoto and nine others were arrested and cited for alleged obstruction at a protest at Kapiolani Medical Center for Women and Children during a management lockout of unionized nurses. The charges were later dismissed.

== Early life and career ==
Iwamoto was born on the island of Kauai and is of Japanese descent. Her mother went into labor at a private party hosted by Grace Guslander to celebrate the expansion of her Coco Palms Resort, and Iwamoto was then born the next day. Guslander visited Iwamoto's mother in the hospital with a bouquet of flowers, a card, and a request to name Iwamoto “Coco” after her hotel.

=== Education ===
Iwamoto attended Kaimukī Community Christian Pre-School on Oʻahu, Hōkūlani Elementary School, Aliʻiōlani Elementary School, and Hanahauʻoli School. She later attended and graduated from Saint Louis School in 1986. She went on to qualify as an Associate of Arts in Merchandising at the Fashion Institute of Technology. Subsequently, she received a Bachelor of Arts in Creative Writing from San Francisco State University and a Juris Doctor from the University of New Mexico School of Law.

In 2011, Iwamoto completed Harvard University's John F. Kennedy School of Government program for Senior Executives in State and Local Government as a David Bohnett Foundation LGBTQ Victory Institute Leadership Fellow.

=== Family and personal life ===
Iwamoto's paternal great-grandparents left Japan to work in the sugar cane plantations of Kauaʻi. Her paternal grandmother met her paternal grandfather at Tip-Top Restaurant on Kauai, where she was working as a cashier. The two used their family cars to start a taxi company, which eventually expanded into a tour company and a rental car company. Iwamoto's father began working for the family business in high school as a car washer, and their collective efforts became known as Roberts Hawaii.

Iwamoto's maternal grandparents left Japan to grow cantaloupe and other produce in Imperial Valley, California. During World War II, Iwamoto's mother and her family were forced into internment camps in Poston, Arizona. Iwamoto's uncles were released from the internment camp to enlist in the military to serve the United States of America. Eventually, the entire family was released and they returned to their farm. When Iwamoto's mother was in high school, she contributed to the family business by taking care of all the bookkeeping.

=== Volunteering and leadership ===
Shortly after finishing her undergraduate degree, Iwamoto moved back to New York City, where she attended the Fashion Institute of Technology. Using her own life experience as a transgender woman, she spent time volunteering at a local community center, helping youth develop leadership skills. It was here that her passions for helping homeless youth and LGBTQ homeless youth were fostered. Helping youth like the ones she worked with in New York was part of her motivation for attending law school. When she returned to Hawaii, she became a licensed therapeutic foster parent. Her foster children would ask her to testify to the Hawaii Board of Education to share their experiences of being bullied and harassed as out trans and gay teenagers.

=== Public service and business experience ===
Iwamoto's other work experiences include serving as Managing Attorney at Volunteer Legal Services Hawaii and facilitating affordable housing through AQuA Rentals, LLC (Affordable Quality Apartment Rentals, LLC). Her volunteer work includes serving on the board of directors for both Kūlia Nā Mamo and Hawaiʻi People's Fund. Iwamoto also co-founded the Hawaii Chamber of Sustainable Commerce, a collective of about 250 businesses as of June 2024.

== Political career ==
=== Early political career ===
Iwamoto served two terms with the Hawaii Board of Education, Oahu-at-Large, from 2006 to 2011. Her election as a trans woman in November 2006 made her, at that time, the highest-ranking openly transgender elected official in the United States and the first openly transgender official to win statewide office. She was reelected in 2010 with 25% more votes than in 2006. Later, Iwamoto served as a commissioner on the Hawaii Civil Rights Commission, appointed by Governor Neil Abercrombie to serve a four-year term from 2012 to 2016.

She ran for the 13th State Senate district in 2016 but was defeated by Karl Rhoads in a three-way Democratic primary.

=== 2018 Lieutenant Governor primary election ===
Iwamoto announced her bid for Lieutenant Governor in November 2017. She was endorsed by the Sierra Club of Hawaii, Victory Fund, Maui Time Weekly, Our Revolution Oʻahu Chapter, Unite Here! Local 5, politician Gary Hooser, activist Mari Matsuda, and advocate and teacher Maya Soetoro-Ng, among others. She came in fourth place, losing the nomination to Senator Josh Green.

=== Hawaii House of Representatives ===
In 2020, Iwamoto ran unsuccessfully against incumbent House speaker Scott Saiki in the Democratic primary for the 26th State House district. She contested him again in 2022 for the 25th district, losing in both primaries by around 200 votes.

In 2024, Iwamoto won the 2024 primary against Saiki. Iwamoto was unchallenged in the general election and was elected to represent the 25th district. Upon taking office, she became the first openly transgender state legislator in Hawaii history.

== Electoral history ==
=== 2024 ===
Hawaii's 25th House District Democratic primary election, 2024
Party	Candidate	Votes	%
Democratic	Kim Coco Iwamoto	2,649	52.5%
Democratic	Scott Saiki (incumbent)	2,395	47.5%
Total votes		5,044	100%

=== 2022 ===
Hawaii's 25th House District Democratic primary election, 2022
Party	Candidate	Votes	%
Democratic	Scott Saiki (incumbent)	2,680	51.5%
Democratic	Kim Coco Iwamoto	2,519	48.5%
Total votes		5,199	100%

=== 2020 ===
Hawaii's 26th District House of Representatives election, 2020
Party	Candidate	Votes	%
Democratic	Scott Saiki (incumbent)	3,393	51.3
Democratic	Kim Coco Iwamoto	3,226	48.7
Total votes		6,619	100

=== 2018 ===
Democratic primary for Lieutenant Governor of Hawaii election, 2018
Party	Candidate	Votes	%
Democratic	Josh Green	74,845	31.4
Democratic	Jill Tokuda	68,124	28.6
Democratic	Bernard Carvalho	45,825	19.2
Democratic	Kim Coco Iwamoto	34,243	14.3
Democratic	Will Espero	15,463	6.5
Total votes		238,500	100.0

=== 2016 ===
2016 Hawaii's 13th Senate District Democratic Primary election
Party	Candidate	Votes	%
Democratic	Karl Rhoads	3,606	41.8%
Democratic	Kim Coco Iwamoto	2,530	29.4%
Democratic	Keone Nakoa	1,865	21.6%
N/A	Blank Votes	612	7.1%
N/A	Over Votes	7	0.1%
Total votes		8,620	100.0%

=== 2010 ===
2010 Hawaii Board of Education election
Party	Candidate	Votes	%
Nonpartisan	Pamela Young	117,489	14.7
Nonpartisan	Kim Coco Iwamoto	102,995	12.9
Nonpartisan	Randal M.L. Lee	76,682	9.6
Nonpartisan	Brian Y. Yamane	74,806	9.4
Nonpartisan	Melanie Bailey	73,052	9.1
Nonpartisan	Roger Kiyoshi Takabayashi	62,216	7.8
N/A	Blank Votes	291,033	36.4
N/A	Over Votes	96	0.0
Total votes		876,574	100

=== 2006 ===
2006 Hawaii Board of Education election
Party	Candidate	Votes	%
Nonpartisan	Donna R. Ikeda	123,345	17.1
Nonpartisan	Karen Knudson	110,823	15.4
Nonpartisan	Kim Coco Iwamoto	81,734	11.4
Nonpartisan	Terrance W.H. Tom	78,205	10.9
Nonpartisan	Brian Y. Yamane	68,916	9.6
Nonpartisan	Darwin L.D. Ching	66,332	9.2
N/A	Blank Votes	189,556	26.4
N/A	Over Votes	116	0.0
Total votes		719,027	100

== Notable national advocacy and recognition ==
Iwamoto was recognized as a Champion of Change by President Barack Obama.

Iwamoto publicly opposed passage of California's Proposition 8, outlawing same-sex marriages in California. She has stated that Proposition 8 reminds her of her mother's internment during World War II and believes the proposition is a violation of essential civil rights, stating, "The country has acknowledged that [internment] as a mistake, to just go with populous fear to oppress a specific group. I think we're going to look back at this kind of oppression as a mistake."

In 2021, Iwamoto joined with local advocates known as the Wai Ola alliance as a plaintiff in a suit against the United States Navy to stop its plan to double line its underground fuel tanks at Red Hill.

In September 2024, Iwamoto and nine others were arrested and cited for alleged obstruction at a protest at Kapiolani Medical Center for Women and Children during a management lockout of unionized nurses. The charges were later dismissed.

== See also ==
- List of transgender public officeholders in the United States
