= Hawaii State Legislature =

Legislative branch of the state government of Hawaii

Hawaii State Legislature ʻAhaʻōlelo kau kānāwai o ka Mokuʻāina o Hawaiʻi (Hawaiian)
- 33rd Legislature

Type
- Type: Bicameral
- Houses: Senate; House of Representatives
- Term limits: None

History
- Founded: 1959
- Preceded by: Hawaii Territorial Legislature
- New session started: January 17, 2024

Leadership
- Senate President: Ron Kouchi (D) since May 5, 2015
- House Speaker: Nadine Nakamura (D) since November 6, 2024

Structure
- Seats: 76
- Senate political groups: Majority: Democratic (22); Minority: Republican (3)
- House political groups: Majority: Democratic (41); Minority: Republican (10)
- Length of term: Senate: 4 years House: 2 years
- Salary: $57,852 per year + $175 per diem for non-Oʻahu members, or $10 per diem for Oʻahu members (2014)
- Senators: 25
- State Representatives: 51

Elections
- Senate voting system: First-past-the-post
- House voting system: First-past-the-post
- Last Senate election: November 3, 2026 (13 seats)
- Last House election: November 3, 2026
- Next Senate election: November 7, 2028 (12 seats)
- Next House election: November 7, 2028
- Redistricting: Hawaii Reapportionment Commission

Meeting place
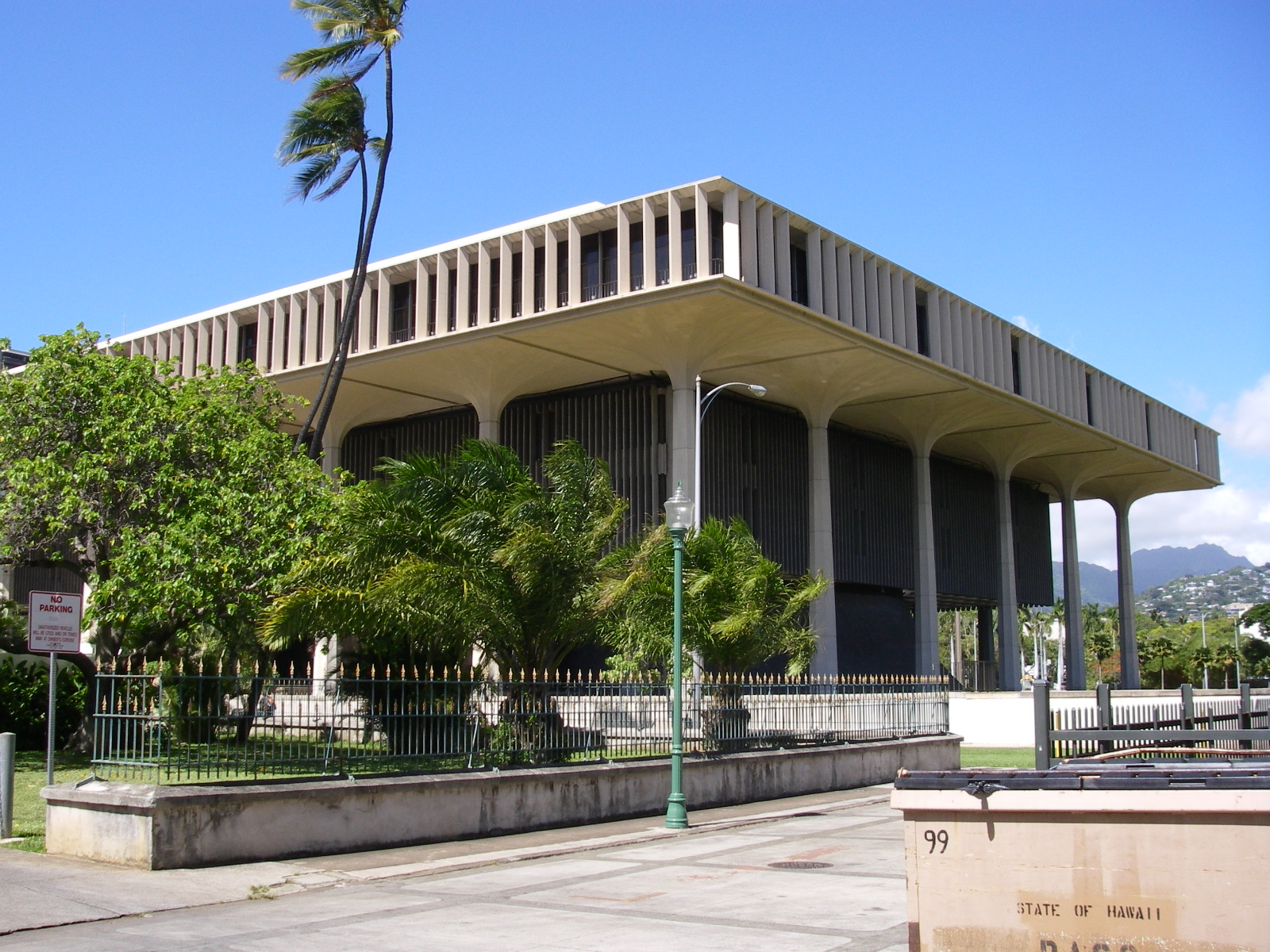
- Hawaii State Capitol; Honolulu

Website
- Hawaii State Legislature

Constitution
- Constitution of Hawaii

The Hawaii State Legislature (Hawaiian: Ka ʻAhaʻōlelo kau kānāwai o ka Mokuʻāina o Hawaiʻi) is the bicameral state legislature of the U.S. state of Hawaii, consisting of the Hawaii State Senate (upper house with 25 senators) and the Hawaii State House of Representatives (lower house with 51 representatives). Each lawmaker represents single member districts across the state. The powers of the legislature are granted under Article III of the Constitution of Hawaii. The legislature convenes at the Hawaii State Capitol building in the state capital of Honolulu, on the island of Oahu.

== History ==
The legislature is a descendant of the two houses of the parliament for the Kingdom of Hawaii, the Legislature of the Hawaiian Kingdom, created in the 1840 Constitution of the Kingdom and continued in the subsequent 1852 Constitution as the Legislature of the Hawaiian Islands, consisting of the House of Representatives (Hawaiian Kingdom) and the House of Nobles. Following the overthrow and fall of the Kingdom of Hawai‘i in 1894 this Legislature became the legislative body of the briefly established Republic of Hawaii, and shortly afterwards under the newly organized Territory of Hawaii following the annexation by the United States in 1898. The current Hawaii State Legislature was created following the passage of the Hawaii Admission Act by the United States Congress in 1959 when the Territory of Hawaii was admitted to the Union as the 50th State.

Timetable of Legislatures in Hawaii
Legislature	Years	Chambers	Meeting Place
Legislature of the Hawaiian Kingdom (ʻAhaʻōlelo o ke Aupuni o Hawaiʻi)	1860–1893	Bicameral (1840–1864): the House of Representatives (Hale ʻAhaʻōlelo Makaʻāinana) and the House of Nobles (Hale ʻAhaʻōlelo Aliʻi); Unicameral (1864–1887): the Legislative Assembly (ʻAhaʻōlelo o ke Aupuni); Bicameral (1887–1893): the House of Representatives and the House of Nobles	Aliʻiōlani Hale
Legislature of the Republic of Hawaii	1894–1898	Bicameral: the House of Representatives and the Senate	ʻIolani Palace
Hawaii Territorial Legislature	1898–1959	Bicameral: the House of Representatives and the Senate	ʻIolani Palace
Hawaii State Legislature (Ka ‘Aha‘ōlelo kau kānāwai o ka Moku‘āina o Hawai‘i)	1959–present	Bicameral: the House of Representatives (Hale o nā Luna Maka‘āinana) and the Senate (Ka ‘Aha Kenekoa)	ʻIolani Palace (1959–1969); Hawaii State Capitol (1969–present)

== Members and terms ==
The 51 members of the House are elected to two-year terms without term limits. The 25 members of the Senate are elected to four-year terms, also without term limits. Like many other state legislatures in the United States, the Hawaii State Legislature is a part-time body and legislators often have active careers outside of government.

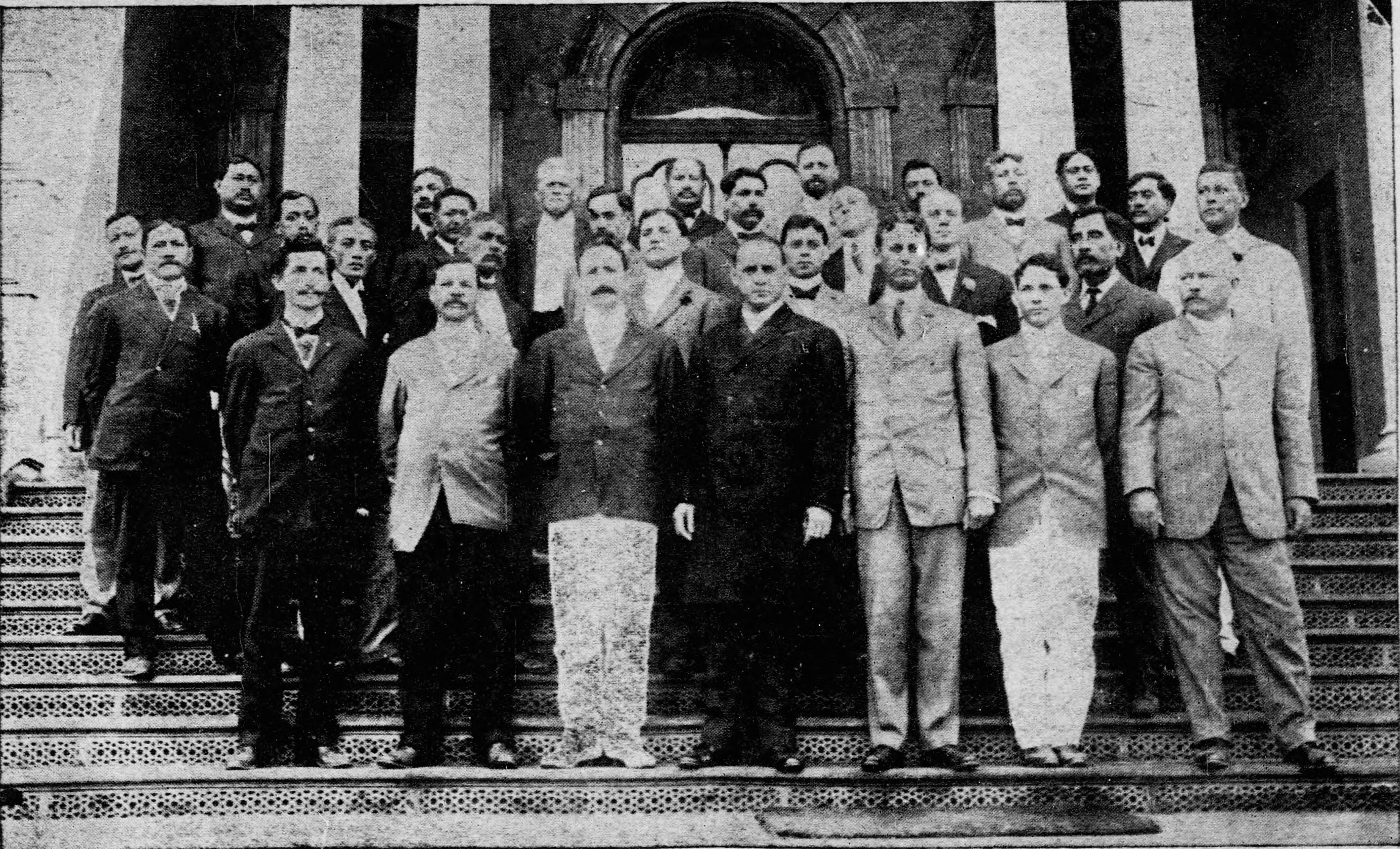
Members of the Territorial Legislature in 1909

According to Article III, section 4 of the Hawaii State Constitution, a legislator's term begins on the day of the general election and ends the day of the general election if a new member is elected.

=== Officers ===
Members of both houses vote to select presiding officers from within their ranks, such as the Speaker of the House and the President of the Senate. These positions are customarily held by members of the majority party in each chamber. The Lieutenant Governor of Hawaii, who also serves as Hawaii's equivalent of a Secretary of State, is entirely removed from the legislative process.

== Sessions ==
Each session of the state legislature lasts for two years, starting in each odd year. Article III, Section 10 of the Hawaii Constitution states that the legislature must convene annually in regular session at 10 a.m. on the third Wednesday in January. Regular sessions are limited to a period of 60 working days, which exclude Saturdays, Sundays, holidays, and designated recess days.

The practical effect of having a two-year session is that any bill introduced in the first (odd-numbered) year which does not pass may be considered in the second year at the point in the process where its progress stopped. At the end of the biennium, however, all bills that did not pass the legislature die; to be considered again they must be reintroduced in the new session.

== Qualifications for office ==
Article III, Section 7 of the Hawaii Constitution state that members of the Hawaii Senate must have been a resident of Hawaii for more than three years, have attained the age of majority and must, prior to filing nomination papers and thereafter continue to be, a qualified voter of the senate district from which the person seeks to be elected. An exception to this rule is that in the year of the first general election following district changes, but prior to the primary election, an incumbent senator may move to a new district without being disqualified from completing the remainder of the incumbent senator's term. Members of the Hawaii House of Representatives must also have been residents of Hawaii for more than three years, must have attained the age of majority, and live in their respective house districts.

== Veto powers ==
In order to override vetoes by the Governor of Hawaii, both houses of the legislature must vote by a two-thirds majority to overrule the governor. Bills presented to the governor more than ten days before the end of that year's session must be signed into law or vetoed within ten days. Bills presented within the final ten days of the session have 45 calendar days to be signed or vetoed, provided the governor gives notice of what bills may be vetoed by the 35th day. The Legislature has the option of calling a special session on the forty-fifth day to vote to override any of the vetoed bills. All bills that are not vetoed or signed become law automatically without the governor's signature. (This system stands in contrast to the pocket veto power held by the president at the federal level.)

The governor also has extensive line-item veto power: bills that appropriate money can have their appropriations reduced or removed entirely by the governor before signing the bill (except where they appropriate money for the judicial or legislative branches). The state legislature does not have the power to override such a veto.

== Capitol ==
The Hawaii State Legislature was moved to the Hawaii State Capitol in the Capital District near downtown Honolulu on March 15, 1969. Following the 1991 session, the Capitol building was closed for four years for asbestos removal, and the Legislature moved temporarily to State Office Tower and Hemmeter Building, also known as No. 1 Capitol District Building. During this time, the Capitol was renovated to meet growing technological needs and improved accessibility for disabled people. The legislature moved back to the Capitol for the 1996 session. Prior to Governor John A. Burns's decision to build the new Capitol building, the Hawaii State Legislature met at ʻIolani Palace.

== See also ==
- 30th Hawaii Territorial Legislature
- List of Hawaii state legislatures
