= Pamela Matson =

American scientist

- Education: University of Wisconsin-Eau Claire, Indiana University, Oregon State University University of North Carolina
- Awards: MacArthur Fellow, NASA Exceptional Service Medal, AAAS Fellow, United States National Academy of Sciences
- Scientific career
- Fields: Ecology, Biology
- Workplaces: University of California, Berkeley, Stanford University, NASA

Pamela Anne Matson (born 1953) is an American scientist and professor. From 2002 - 2017 she was the dean of the Stanford University School of Earth, Energy & Environmental Sciences. She also previously worked at NASA and at the University of California, Berkeley. Matson is the Richard and Rhoda Goldman Professor of Environmental Studies (Emerita) at the Stanford Doerr School of Sustainability and a Senior Fellow (Emerita) at the Stanford Woods Institute for the Environment. Matson is a winner of the prestigious MacArthur Fellowship, also known as the "genius grant," and is considered to be a "pioneer in the field of environmental science." She was appointed to the "Einstein Professorship" of the Chinese Academy of Sciences in 2011. She received an honorary doctorate from McGill University in 2017. She is married to fellow scientist Peter Vitousek.

== Early life and education ==
Pamela Matson grew up in Hudson, Wisconsin. She studied biology at the University of Wisconsin-Eau Claire. After graduation, Matson started a career that would center on environmental issues. She completed her M.S. from the School of Public and Environmental Affairs at the Indiana University, her PhD in Forest Ecology from Oregon State University, and did postdoctoral research at the University of North Carolina.

== Work ==
Matson's first job was at the NASA Ames Research Center where she studied the atmosphere above the Amazon rainforest with emphasis on the way deforestation and pollution affected the environment. After her time with NASA, Matson joined the Environmental Science Policy Management Program at the University of California, Berkeley, where she collaborated in trying to promote a community of academics interested in environmental issues. Matson eventually became the dean of the School of Earth Sciences at Stanford. There she started a sustainability roundtable to bring people together to discuss environmental issues. Matson was selected as a MacArthur Fellow, and in 1997 was elected as a Fellow of the American Association for the Advancement of Science. In 2002, she was named the Burton and Deedee McMurtry University Fellow in Undergraduate Education at Stanford. The "Matson Sustainability Science Research Laboratory" at Stanford is named after her. She was the editor of the journal Annual Review of Environment and Resources. from 2003 to 2008.

== Honors ==
- Ames Associate Fellow (1992)
- Fellow of the American Academy of Arts and Sciences (1992)
- NASA Exceptional Service Medal (1993)
- United States National Academy of Sciences (1994)
- MacArthur Fellowship (1995–2000)
- University of Wisconsin-Eau Claire Distinguished Alumni Award (1996)
- Fellow of the American Association for the Advancement of Science (1997)
- Oregon State University Distinguished Alumni Award (1998)
- McMurtrey Fellow for Undergraduate Education
