= Peter Vitousek =

American ecologist (born 1949)

- Born: January 24, 1949 (age 77); Territory of Hawaii, US
- Spouse: Pamela Matson
- Awards: Princeton Environmental Prize (2002)

Academic background
- Education: BA., 1971 Amherst College; PhD., 1975, Dartmouth College

Academic work
- Institutions: Indiana University; Stanford University
- Notable students: Virginia Matzek

Peter Morrison Vitousek (born January 24, 1949) is an American ecologist, particularly known for his work on the nitrogen cycle.

Born in Hawaii, Vitousek graduated from Amherst College in 1971 and received his Ph.D. in biology from Dartmouth College in 1975. Since then, he has worked as an Assistant Professor of Zoology and Biology at Indiana University (1975–79), an Associate Professor of Botany and Biology at the University of North Carolina at Chapel Hill (1980–83), and a Professor in the Department of Biology at Stanford University since 1984. He is married to fellow Stanford professor and ecologist Pamela Matson.

He was elected a member of the National Academy of Sciences in 1992. In 1993, he was elected a Fellow of the American Academy of Arts and Sciences. Vitousek was awarded the 2006 NAS Award for Scientific Reviewing "for his scholarly and inspirational book and reviews on nitrogen cycling and its role in the evolving patterns of ecosystem productivity and diversity." In 2010, he was awarded the Japan Prize and in 2012 was an inaugural Fellow of the Ecological Society of America.

Vitousek is the son of Betty and Roy Vitousek Jr of Hawaii. He is the grandson of Roy A. Vitousek who was a three-term Speaker of the Hawaii House of Representatives.

== Selected publications ==
- Peter M. Vitousek (1982) Nutrient Cycling and Nutrient Use Efficiency. Am Nat. 119, pp. 553.
- Peter M. Vitousek, Paul R. Ehrlich, Anne H. Ehrlich and Pamela A. Matson (1986) Human Appropriation of the Products of Photosynthesis. BioScience 36: 368-373
- Peter M. Vitousek & L.R. Walker (1989) Biological invasion by Myrica faya in Hawai'i: plant demography, nitrogen fixation, and ecosystem effects. Ecological Monographs 59: 247–265.
- Peter M. Vitousek & R W. Howarth (1991) Nitrogen limitation on land and in the sea: How can it occur? Biogeochemistry 13: 87-115
- Peter M. Vitousek, John D. Aber, Robert W. Howarth, Gene E. Likens, Pamela A. Matson, David W. Schindler, William H. Schlesinger, David G. Tilman (1997) Human alteration of the global nitrogen cycle: Sources and consequences. Ecological Applications: 7, 737-750.
- Peter M. Vitousek, Harold A. Mooney, Jane Lubchenco, Jerry M. Melillo. (1997) Human Domination of Earth's Ecosystems. Science 277: 494 – 499.
- Peter M. Vitousek (2004) Nutrient Cycling and Limitation: Hawai‘i as a Model System. Princeton University Press.
- Peter M. Vitousek, T.L. Ladefoged, P.V. Kirch, A.S. Hartshorn, M.W. Graves, S.C. Hotchkiss, S. Tuljapurkar, and O.A. Chadwick (2004) Agriculture, soils, and society in precontact Hawai’i. Science 304: 1665–1669
- Peter M. Vitousek, R. Naylor, T. Crews, M. B. David, L.E. Drinkwater, E. Holland, P. J. Johnes, J. Katzenberger, L. A. Martinelli, P. A. Matson, G. Nziguheba, D. Ojima, C. A. Palm, G. P. Robertson, P. A. Sanchez, A. R. Townsend, F. S. Zhang (2009) Nutrient Imbalances in Agricultural Development: Science 324: 1519-1520.
