= Marcus Oshiro =

American politician (born 1959)

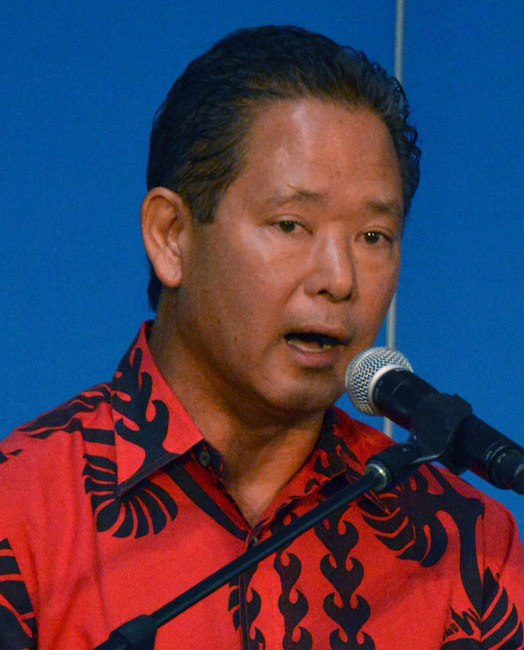
- Oshiro in 2016

Majority Leader of the Hawaii House of Representatives
- In office 2005–2006
- Preceded by: Scott Saiki
- Succeeded by: Kirk Caldwell
- In office 2001–2002
- Preceded by: Ed Case
- Succeeded by: Scott Saiki

Member of the Hawaii House of Representatives from the 46th district 40th (1994–2002) 39th (2002–2012)
- In office November 8, 1994 – December 22, 2017
- Preceded by: Robert Bunda
- Succeeded by: Lei Learmont

Personal details
- Born: April 24, 1959 (age 67) Honolulu, Territory of Hawaii
- Party: Democratic
- Education: University of Hawaii at Manoa; Willamette University College of Law
- Profession: Lawyer

Marcus R. Oshiro (born April 24, 1959 in Honolulu, Hawaii) is an American politician who was a Democratic member of the Hawaii House of Representatives from 1994 to 2017. Oshiro consecutively served from November 1994 until 2012 in the District 40 and 39 seats, and 2012 until 2017 for District 46. He is the son of former state representative Robert C. Oshiro.

In 2017, Governor of Hawaii David Ige appointed Lei Learmont to succeed him when he joined the Hawai‘i Labor Relations Board. He retired from the board on October 31, 2024.

== Education ==
Oshiro earned his BA from the University of Hawaii at Manoa and his JD from Willamette University College of Law. He was a member of the inaugural 1997 class of the Pacific Century Fellows.

== Elections ==
- 2012 Redistricted to District 46, and with Democratic Representative Gil Riviere redistricted to District 47, Oshiro was unopposed for the August 11, 2012 Democratic Primary, winning with 2,808 votes, and won the November 6, 2012 General election against Republican nominee Christopher Murphy.
- 1994 When Democratic Representative Robert Bunda ran for Hawaii Senate and left the House District 40 seat open, Oshiro won the September 17, 1994 Democratic Primary with 2,013 votes (50.6%), and won the three-way November 8, 1994 General election with 3,348 votes (52.2%) against Republican nominee Yoshiro Nakamura and Best Party candidate Loree Johnson.
- 1996 Oshiro won the September 21, 1996 Democratic Primary with 2,787 votes (64.4%), and was unopposed for the November 5, 1996 General election.
- 1998 Oshiro was unopposed for the September 19, 1998 Democratic Primary, winning with 2,405, and won the November 3, 1998 General election with 4,653 votes (69.3%) against Republican nominee Raymond Santana.
- 2000 Oshiro was unopposed for the September 23, 2000 Democratic Primary, winning with 2,501 votes, and won the November 5, 2002 General election with 3,145 votes (55.9%) against Republican nominee Allan Tomas.
- 2002 Redistricted to District 39, and with Republican Representative Guy Ontai redistricted to District 37, Oshiro was unopposed for the September 21, 2002 Democratic Primary, winning with 2,381 votes, and won the November 5, 2002 General election with 4,430 votes (66.6%) against Republican nominee Cynthia Jenkins. who had been redistricted from District 6.
- 2004 Oshiro was unopposed for the September 18, 2004 Democratic Primary, winning with 2,519 votes, and won the November 2, 2004 General election with 5,160 votes (71.7%) against Republican nominee Augustina Tomas, who had run for the seat in 2002 but lost the primary.
- 2006 Oshiro was unopposed for the September 26, 2006 Democratic Primary, winning with 3,029 votes, and won the November 7, 2006 General election with 4,045 votes (71.0%) against Republican nominee Gail Dukes-Requilman.
- 2008 Oshiro was unopposed for both the September 20, 2008 Democratic Primary, winning with 2,168 votes, and the November 4, 2008 General election.
- 2010 Oshiro was unopposed for the September 18, 2010 Democratic Primary, winning with 2,928 votes, and won the November 2, 2010 General election with 3,769 votes (62.5%) against Republican nominee Sam Curtis.
