= Lei Learmont =

American politician

Member of the Hawaii House of Representatives from the 46th District
- In office December 22, 2017 – November 6, 2018
- Preceded by: Marcus Oshiro
- Succeeded by: Amy Perruso

Personal details
- Born: Naalehu, Hawaii
- Party: Democratic
- Education: University of Oregon

Lei Learmont is an American politician from the Democratic Party of Hawaii. She was a member of the Hawaii House of Representatives from 2017 to 2018.

Learmont is a member of the Wahiawa-Whitmore Village Neighborhood Board, the Friends of the Wahiawa Library, the Wahiawa Historical Society, and the Wahiawa Community Business Association.

She was first appointed by Governor of Hawaii David Ige to replace Marcus Oshiro. In the 2018 Hawaii House of Representatives election, she was defeated in the Democratic primary by Amy Perruso.
