= Joseph M. Souki =

American politician

Joe Souki
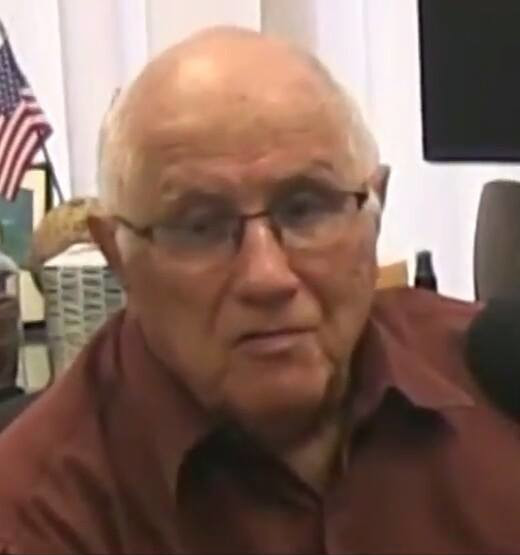

7th and 9th Speaker of the Hawaii House of Representatives
- In office January 16, 2013 – May 4, 2017
- Preceded by: Calvin Say
- Succeeded by: Scott Saiki
- In office January 4, 1993 – January 4, 1999
- Preceded by: Daniel J. Kihano
- Succeeded by: Calvin Say

Member of the Hawaii House of Representatives from the 8th district 9th (1984–1992)
- In office 1982 – March 21, 2018
- Succeeded by: Troy Hashimoto

Personal details
- Born: April 25, 1933 (age 93) Puʻunene, Hawaii, U.S.
- Party: Democratic
- Spouse: Frances Borge
- Children: Desiree; Mark
- Education: Woodbury University
- Website: House website

Joseph "Joe" M. Souki (born 1933) is an American Democratic politician and former Speaker of the Hawaii House of Representatives.

He served as a Private First Class in the United States Army from 1954–1956.

Souki replaced former Speaker Calvin Say in 2013, after organizing a coalition with both Democrats and Republicans. This was his second tenure as Speaker, as he had previously served from 1993 to 1999. He represented Hawaii's 8th District since 1982, and served as Chair of the Finance Committee and the Transportation Committee. He was the primary sponsor of 825 bills. Before becoming a politician, Souki was a real estate broker and Executive Director of the Maui Economic Opportunity.

Souki was accused by several women of multiple counts of sexual harassment including unwanted kissing, touching and sexual language by the Hawaii State Ethics Commission. On March 21, 2018, Souki agreed to resign his seat, apologize and pay a $5,000 fine.

== See also ==
- Politics of Hawaii
- Me Too movement

Political offices
Preceded by Calvin Say	Speaker of the Hawaii House of Representatives; 2013–2017	Succeeded by Scott Saiki
Preceded by Daniel J. Kihano	Speaker of the Hawaii House of Representatives; 1993–1999	Succeeded by Calvin Say
