= Virginia Matzek =

American restoration ecologist

- Born: Davis, California, USA
- Known for: Environmental Scientist

Academic background
- Education: B.A, M.A, University of California, Berkeley; PhD., 2006, Stanford University
- Thesis: Morphological, physiological, and biochemical aspects of growth rate in plants (2006)
- Academic advisor: Peter Vitousek

Academic work
- Institutions: California State University, Sacramento; Santa Clara University
- Website: virginiamatzek.com

Virginia Alynn Matzek is an American restoration ecologist. She is an associate professor in environmental studies and sciences at Santa Clara University.

== Education ==
Matzek completed her Bachelor of Arts and Master of Arts at the University of California, Berkeley. In 1998, Matzek was the recipient of the UC Berkeley's Outstanding Graduate Student Instructor award. In 1999, Matzek was the recipient of the UC Berkeley's Teaching Effectiveness award.

While at Stanford for her doctoral studies, Matzek sidelined as a teaching assistant in the School of Humanities and Sciences. In 2005, Matzek was one of the recipients awarded the Walter J. Gores Award for Excellence in Teaching. After completing her graduate studies at Stanford alongside Peter Vitousek, she joined the Environmental Studies Institution at Santa Clara University as the director of campus and community programs and a lecturer.

== Career ==
In 2007, while serving as the director of campus and community programs for Santa Clara University's Environmental Studies Institute, she began to teach a course entitled "The Joy of Garbage" which focused on decomposition. This was, however, her last year at Santa Clara University as she accepted a tenure-track position at California State University, Sacramento as an Assistant Professor in Environmental Studies. She proposed to continue the course "The Joy of Garbage" at California State University, Sacramento. She returned to Santa Clara in 2011.

In 2014, she was selected to sit on the board of the California Invasive Plant Council. The year after, she received a $39,643 grant from the National Science Foundation to conduct research on ecological restoration in Australia. She also received funding to study carbon credits associated with forest management strategies in France.

During the summer before the 2016–17 academic year, Matzek set up an experiment to remove and control Brachypodium sylvaticum. As well, during the term she received tenure from the university and was promoted to associate professor. Matzek later was the recipient of two research awards from the California Department of Conservation and the Mid-Peninsula Regional Open Space District.

In the article “40: Can We and Should We Resurrect Extinct Species?”, published on December 17, 2020, Virginia Matzek examines the concept of de-extinction and the scientific and ethical debates surrounding efforts to revive extinct species. She discusses advances in biotechnology that may make de-extinction possible while highlighting concerns about ecological impacts, conservation priorities, and whether resources would be better directed toward protecting currently endangered species.

In 2018, she received a grant to design a policy for accounting for carbon storage in restored and conserved oak woodlands in California.

== Personal life ==
Matzek describes herself as a liberal and attended the 2017 Women's March with her two sons.

== Selected publications ==
- Global patterns of the isotopic composition of soil and plant nitrogen (2003)
- Carbon sequestration and plant community dynamics following reforestation of tropical pasture (2004)
- Are you what you eat? Physiological constraints on organismal stoichiometry in an elementally imbalanced world (2005)
- N: P stoichiometry and protein: RNA ratios in vascular plants: an evaluation of the growth‐rate hypothesis (2009)
- Climate change's impact on key ecosystem services and the human well‐being they support in the US (2013)
