= Calvin Say =

American politician

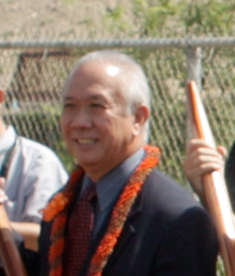
- Say in 2011

8th Speaker of the Hawaii House of Representatives
- In office January 4, 1999 – January 16, 2013
- Preceded by: Joseph M. Souki
- Succeeded by: Joseph M. Souki

Member of the Hawaii House of Representatives from the 20th district 9th (1976–1982) 14th (1982–1984) 25th (1984–1992) 18th (1992–2002)
- In office November 2, 1976 – November 3, 2020
- Preceded by: Dan Hakoda
- Succeeded by: Jackson Sayama

Member of the Honolulu City Council from the 5th district
- In office January 2, 2021 – January 2, 2025
- Preceded by: Ann Kobayashi
- Succeeded by: Scott Nishimoto

Personal details
- Born: February 1, 1952 (age 74) Honolulu, Territory of Hawaii
- Party: Democratic
- Spouse: Cora Kotake
- Profession: businessman

Calvin Kwai Yen Say (Chinese: 佘貴人; Jyutping: Sei^{4} Gwai^{3} Jan^{4}; born February 1, 1952) is an American politician and former Speaker of the Hawaii House of Representatives. Say most recently served as a member of the Honolulu City Council, representing Honolulu's 5th District from 2020 to 2024. He was sworn in as a member of the council in January 2021, taking the seat formerly occupied by Ann Kobayashi, who retired due to the council's term limits. After being worn in, Say was appointed chairperson of the council's budget committee. He retired in 2025 after 48 years of holding elected office.

Prior to his election to the City Council, Say was a Democratic member of the Hawaii State House of Representatives, representing the 20th District from 1976 to 2020. In 1993 he became House Finance Chair. He served as Speaker of the House for 13 years until 2013, when he was replaced by Joseph M. Souki (who was himself a former Speaker). He attended Saint Louis High School and received a bachelor's degree in education from the University of Hawaiʻi at Mānoa.

Political offices
Preceded by Joseph M. Souki	Speaker of the Hawaii House of Representatives; 1999–2013	Succeeded by Joseph M. Souki
