= Andrew Toti =

Andrew J. Toti (24 July 1915 – 20 March 2005) was an American inventor. Toti was born in Visalia, California, and died in Modesto, California. He held more than 500 U.S. patents at the time of his death. Toti was honored by the Edison Society in 1995.

Among his many inventions, the most famous was an automated chicken plucker, a light-weight construction beam (commonly used in Australia), and the EndoFlex endotracheal tube (co-invented with Michael H. Wong and Jay Kotin). Toti invented a combination lock when he was 12 years old. Although he falsely claimed to have invented the "Mae West" life preserver, credited with saving hundreds of aviators' lives during World War II, it was actually invented by Peter Markus, who was granted a patent for it in 1928, when Toti was only 11 years old.

Toti attended Modesto High School through tenth grade. He completed his education through correspondence courses.

Toti owned and operated Tro-Pic-Kal Manufacturing Company of Modesto for approximately 60 years.

== Family ==
- Spouse: Marion Toti
- Daughter: Andrea Pimental née Toti
- Son: Tom Toti
- Unknown child
- Stepson: Raymond Webster

Toti's parents, who immigrated to the US from Italy, bought a delicatessen when he was nine years old.
