= Tadao Beppu =

American politician and businessman

2nd Speaker of the Hawaii House of Representatives
- In office 1968–1974
- Preceded by: Elmer F. Cravalho
- Succeeded by: James H. Wakatsuki

Member of the Hawaii House of Representatives from the 10th district 16th (1959–1970)
- In office 1959–1974

Personal details
- Born: March 26, 1919 Kihei, Maui, Hawaii, U.S.
- Died: July 22, 1993 (aged 74)
- Resting place: National Memorial Cemetery of the Pacific
- Party: Democratic
- Spouse: Alice
- Children: 2

Military service
- Allegiance: United States
- Branch/service: United States Army
- Years of service: 1943–1947
- Rank: Technical sergeant
- Unit: 442nd Regimental Combat Team
- Battles/wars: World War II (WIA)
- Awards: Soldier's Medal; Purple Heart

Tadao Beppu (Japanese: 別府 忠雄, March 26, 1919 – July 22, 1993) was an American politician and businessman.

Born in Maui County, Hawaii, to Japanese immigrant parents, Beppu graduated from University of Hawaiʻi and went to graduate school at Northwestern University. During World War II, Beppu served in the United States Army in Europe. After the war, Beppu was involved with the real estate business. In 1958, Beppu served in the Hawaii Territorial House of Representatives and was a Democrat. From 1959 to 1976, Beppu served in the Hawaii House of Representatives and was speaker of the house from 1968 to 1974. He also served as secretary of the Hawaii Constitutional Convention of 1968. After he left the Hawaii Legislature, Beppu served as deputy director of the Hawaii Department of Health.
