= Bertha Kawakami =

American politician and educator

Bertha Bicenta Leinaala Ching Kawakami (July 28, 1931 – November 30, 2017) was an American politician and educator.

Born in Honolulu, Hawaii, Kawakami received her bachelor's degree in education from University of Hawaii at Manoa in 1952 and her master's degree from New York University in 1962. Kawakami was a teacher and a school principal. She lived in Hanapepe, Hawaii. Kawakami was appointed to the Hawaii House of Representatives in March 1987 when her husband Richard Kawakami died while still in office. Kawakami served in the Hawaii Legislature until her retirement in 2006 and was a Democrat. Kawakami died in Honolulu, Hawaii.
