= Tim Kawakami =

American sports journalist

Tim Kawakami is an American sports journalist for The San Francisco Standard. Previously, he was a sports columnist for the San Jose Mercury News. In addition to his print column, he maintained a blog, communicated on Twitter, and had a podcast series. He was named the California Sportswriter of the Year by the National Sportscasters and Sportswriters Association in 2013. In 2017, he joined The Athletic, a subscription-based, sports journalism website, becoming the editor-in-chief for its San Francisco Bay Area edition.

== Early life ==
Kawakami was born in Oakland, California, and later moved to San Francisco and Burlingame. His grandfather owned The New World-Sun, a Japanese-language newspaper in San Francisco. Kawakami attended Northwestern University, where he got his start in sportswriting with The Daily Northwestern.

== Career ==
Kawakami interned at the Philadelphia Daily News, and became their beat writer for the Philadelphia Eagles in the late 1980s. He joined the Los Angeles Times in 1990 and covered the Los Angeles Rams before moving to boxing in 1993. While continuing to cover boxing, he began covering UCLA Bruins men's basketball in their national title season in 1994–95. He became the beat writer for the Los Angeles Lakers in 1998–99, covering the basketball team through the Shaquille O'Neal–Kobe Bryant era. Kawakami was interested in becoming a columnist, but the Times filled their opening with T. J. Simers. Kawakami left for the San Jose Mercury News in the mid-2000s, writing a Page 2 column and later a regular column.

Kawakami started his "Talking Points" blog in 2006. He once said, "I love the energy of the blog world", which The Big Lead called a rarity for a mainstream media member in 2009. He also started using Twitter in 2009, and developed a reputation for blocking users from seeing his posts for offenses such as telling him what to do, making racist comments, or laughing at him (e.g. "LOL"). He began a podcast series, “The TK Show”, in 2015, when he also began a recurring segment with Ray Ratto called "But Seriously" on Comcast SportsNet Bay Area's Yahoo SportsTalk Live.

Kawakami left The Mercury in July 2017 to become the editor-in-chief of the San Francisco Bay Area edition of The Athletic. He joined The San Francisco Standard on September 13, 2024, together with fellow Athletic journalist David Lombardi. Kawakami said his departure stemmed from a desire to prioritize local sports coverage, a focus he felt was shifting at The Athletic in favor of a broader, national perspective.

SFGate wrote that Bay Area media circles generally considered him to be "credible, fair, and tenacious".
