= Mine Kawakami =

Japanese pianist and composer (born 1969)

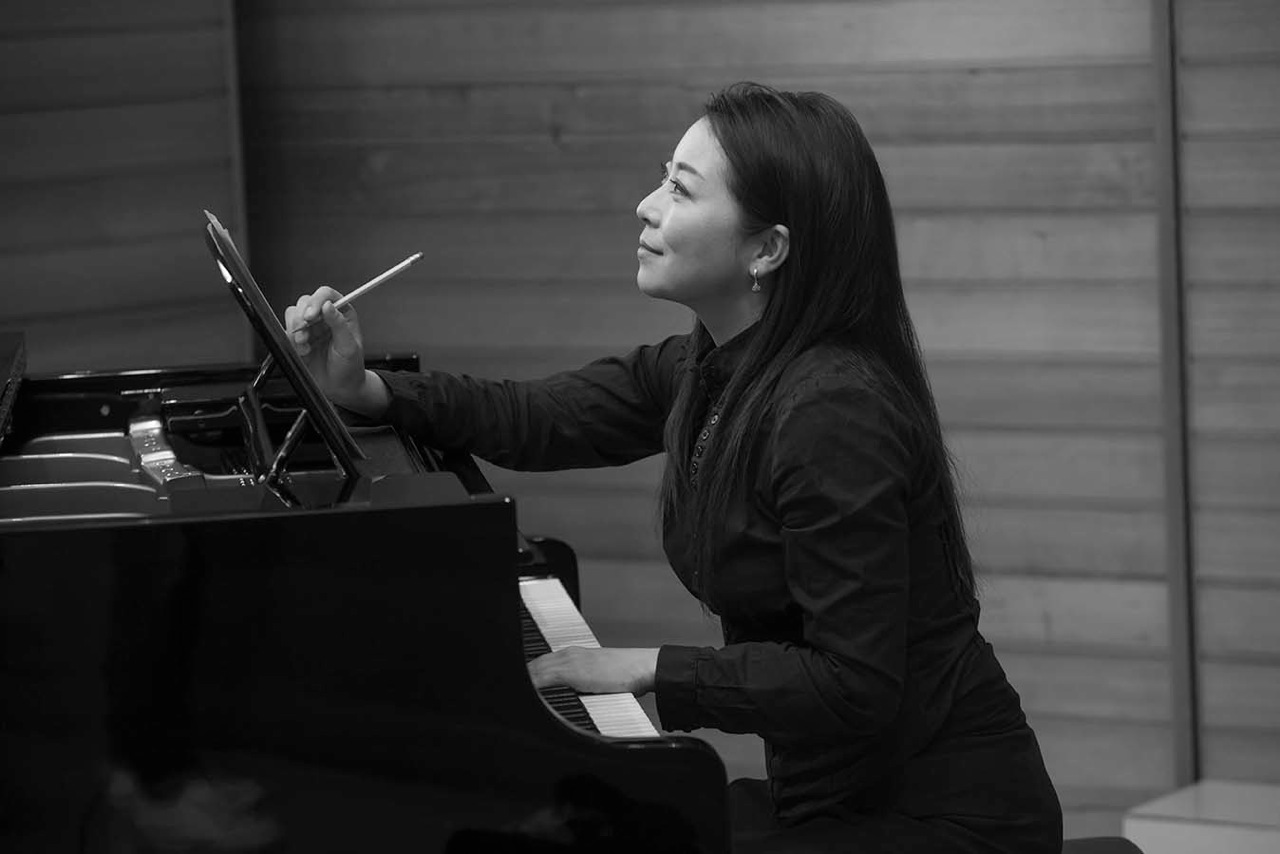
- Mine Kawakami
- Born: September 7, 1969 (age 56); Japan Aichi prefecture
- Occupation(s): pianist, composer

Mine Kawakami (born September 7, 1969) (Shōwa 44) is a Japanese pianist and composer.

== Biography ==
Mine Kawakami was born in the town of Nagakute, Japan in 1969. She started playing piano at age 3. She is entitled in music by High School Aichi Prefectural Meiwa and graduated from the Hochschule für Musik in Munich and the Madrid Royal Conservatory. As a classical musician, she has performed on the five continents, organized by foundations such as YAMAHA, NHK (Japan Broadcasting Corporation), Japan Foundation, SEEI, Embassy of Spain in Japan or the Ministry of Foreign Affairs of Japan. She has the awards of Radio Nagoya (1986) and the Munich Conservatory Competition (1990).

However, her formation in cultured tradition has been gradually approaching, without setting any barriers, different styles and aesthetics. These include traditional Japanese music, reflections from impressionism and neoclassicism, Latin jazz and Cuban rhythms. In 1996, she began her career as a composer.

Past projects include the two-piano concert with Chucho Valdés in Teatro Amadeo Roldan in Havana, Cuba (2004). In 2005, Kawakami was the pianist and official composer of the World Expo 2005 in Aichi (Japan), in 2008 she performed "Los Conciertos del Sueño" in Spain, an experimental proposal born in Japan, which approached and emphasized concepts of musical therapy. In 2013, Mine Kawakami was commissioned to compose the Sonata samurai in cultural events organized to commemorate the "Dual Year Spain – Japan", premiering this composition on June 11 at the Teatro Real in Madrid, in the presence of the Prince and Princess of Spain and the Prince of Japan, Naruhito. On March 11, 2014, played inside the Cathedral of Córdoba a unique concert that gathered more than 1,400 people.

In the words of Mine "The piano can express infinite number of possible sounds, rhythms and tones. I want my compositions and my playing forward so you might be touching the trees in the jungle, the sound of the wind or the voice of the earth."

== Discography ==
- In LatinAmerica (2004)
- In The Forest (2006)
- Kaori (2010)
- O meu caminho (2011)
- El piano durmiente (2012)
- Sonata samurái (2013)
- Samurai 1613 (2015)
- Nostalghia-Kiyomizu- (2017)
- NHK Radio Shinya Bin -Piano ga Kanaderu 72 kou- (2017)
- Yamato Amadera Shojin Nikki Original Soundtrack (2019)
- Pilgrim (2019)
- Sky Blue (2019)
- Christmas of Mine (2019)
- Neko no Shippo Kaeru no Te (2020)

== Soundtracks ==
- Morizo to Kikoro (2005). 4 chapters.
- Kamataki (2006). Film directed by Claude Gagnon. Theme: "Como si fuera una cancion" (original of Victor Fonseca, musical arrangement & piano by Mine Kawakami)
- Neko no shippo Kaeru note (2010). 3 chapters.
- El jardín de las cuatro estaciones (2013). Film based on the life of Venetia Stanley-Smith.
- Anime time of adult women (2013). 4 chapters.

== Concerts ==
Town	Venue	Date	Comments
Cambados, Spain	Auditorio da Xuventude	August 31, 2014	
Santiago de Compostela, Spain	Cathedral of Santiago de Compostela	August 28, 2014	
Riveira, Spain	Parish Church	July 25, 2014	Caritas España concert
Madrid, España	Teatro Real	July 15, 2014	Closing ceremony Año Dual España Japón https://www.youtube.com/watch?v=5tOZPRyVVxY
Vigo, España	Teatro García Barbón	March 16, 2014	
Vilagarcía de Arousa, España	Salón García	March 15, 2014	
Pontevedra, España	Fundación Caixa Nova	March 14, 2014	
Córdoba, España	Mezquita-Catedral de Córdoba	March 11, 2014	https://www.youtube.com/watch?v=8cAc2I-1bMQ
Tokyo, Japan	Hotel New Otani	February 6, 2014	
Madrid, Spain	Fundación Canal	January 4, 2014	
Rivas Vaciamadrid, Spain	Pilar Bardem	December 8, 2013	
Kyoto, Japan	Yearly concert at Kiyomizu-dera	2005–2013	https://www.youtube.com/watch?v=u8Acl3C5kOw
Valladolid, Spain	Carpa del Milenio	September 12, 2013	
Santiago de Compostela, Spain	Cathedral	June 17, 2013	With Carlos Núñez.
Madrid, Spain	Teatro Real de Madrid	June 11, 2013	Opening Gala "Año Dual Spain Japón". In presence of Spanish and Japanese princes.http://www.rtve.es/alacarta/videos/los-conciertos-de-la-2/conciertos-2-concierto-400-aniversario-relaciones-espana-japon/2061191/
Kyoto, Japan	Kyoto Concert Hall	December 14, 2012	Christmas concert
Bilbao, Spain	BBK	November 25, 2012	DIA INTERNACIONAL DE LUCHA CONTRA LA VIOLENCIA DE GÉNERO
Logroño, Spain	Rioja Forum	November 5, 2012	
Lanzarote, Spain	La Cueva de los Verdes	April 30, 2012	
Ishinomaki, Japan	Music High School	March 11, 2012	in the TV program commemorating " One year after the tsunami" broadcast by NHK.
Huelva, Spain	Las Cocheras del Puerto	March 1, 2012	
San Sebastián de los Reyes, Spain	Adolfo Marsillach	February 11, 2012	
Leon, Spain	Auditorium	November 15, 2011	
Colmenarejo, Spain	Centro Cultural	October 22, 2011	
Valladolid, Spain	Cúpula del Milenio	October 20, 2011	
Salamanca, Spain	Palacio de Congresos	October 15, 2011	
Barcelona, Spain	L'Audirori	October 1, 2011	
Madrid, Spain	Fernando Fernán Gómez	May 6, 2011	May 6 and 7.
Onjuku, Japan	Culture House	November 7, 2010	
Tokyo, Japan	FIAT SPACE	October 26, 2010	
Madrid, Spain	Fernando Fernán Gómez	October 15, 2010	
Lugo, Spain	Plaza de Santa María	September 5, 2010	
Santiago de Compostela, Spain	Parque Bonaval	August 24, 2010	
Orense, Spain	Plaza de la Magdalena	August 11, 2010	
Pontevedra, Spain	Plaza del Teucro	August 10, 2010	
CAUDETE, Spain	Centro de Cultura	April 25, 2010	
DAIMIEL, Spain	Centro de cultura	February 6, 2010	
Madrid, Spain	Teatro Lara	July 29, 2009	
Córdoba, Spain	La Magdalena	April 23, 2009	
Consuegra, Spain	Centro de Cultura	April 17, 2009	
Fuentealbilla, Spain	Centro de Cultura	April 11, 2009	
Pioz, Spain	Centro de Cultura	March 4, 2009	
Nerpio, Spain	Centro de Cultura	February 14, 2009	
Cuenca, Spain	Auditorium	February 6, 2009	
Azuqueca de Henares, Spain	Centro de Cultura	January 24, 2009	
Lima, Peru	Teatro Peruano Japonés	February 5, 2008	
Cazorla, Spain	Hotel Sierra de Cazorla	December 27, 2007	"Los conciertos del Sueño"
Bilbao, Spain	Barakaldo Antzokia	November 2, 2007	
Almedinilla, Spain	Villa Romana	September 18, 2007	"Los conciertos del Sueño"
Gijón, Spain	Revillagigedo	September 6, 2007	
Barcelona, Spain	Auditori FAD	June 19, 2007	"Los conciertos del Sueño"
Madrid, Spain	Fernando Fernán Gómez	April 2, 2007	April 2 and 3.
Madrid, Spain	Círculo de Bellas Artes de Madrid	March 9, 2007	"Los conciertos del Sueño"
Valencia	Palau de la Música	February 23, 2007	
Gosen, Niigata Prefecture, Japan	Town Hall	2007	
Málaga, Spain		2007	
Salamanca, Spain	Hospedería de Fonseca	November 9, 2006	
Alalapardo, Spain	Auditorio	June 9, 2006	
La Habana, Cuba	Cuba Disco 2005	May 25, 2005	
Fidji Islands	Lahaina Jodo Mission	April 3, 2005	
La Habana, Cuba	Teatro Amadeo Roldán	October 15, 2004	Two piano concert with Chucho Valdés
Buenos Aires, Argentina	Teatro Margarita Xirgu	October 7, 2004	With Néstor Marconi.
São Paulo, Brasil	Concertos no Mercado	September 25, 2004	
Camagüey	Club Minerva	July 14, 2004	
Santa Cruz de la Sierra, Bolivia	AECI	August 23, 2003	
Santa Cruz de la Sierra, Bolivia	Cine Bellavista	January 31, 2003	
Kyoto, Japan	Vivo Spot Rag	2007	With Jin Oki and Ogimi.
Tokyo, Japan	Roppongi STB	2007	With Jin Oki and Ogimi.
Aichi, Japan	Pabellón de Cuba en la Expo de Aichi	June 27, 2005	
Niigata, Japan		2007	With Noriko Kawamura (violin) and Fumio (contrabass)
Bogotá, Colombia	Teatro Jorge Eliécer Gaitán	February 16, 2008	
Cali, Colombia	Teatro Municipal	February 22, 2008	
Logroño, Spain	Open air	July 24, 2010	
Alalpardo, Spain	Sala Ala Artis	March 7, 2009	"Los conciertos del Sueño"
Almedinilla, Spain	Museo Arqueológico	September 28, 2007	"Los conciertos del Sueño"
