= Nostalgia Super Stock =

Drag racing class

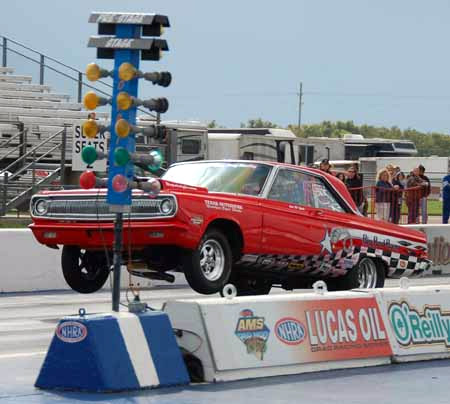
NSS Car (Big Red Ram) Launching

Nostalgia Super Stock (a.k.a. NSS) is among the most popular, and fastest growing forms of drag racing. The class recreates the style of drag racing very popular in the 1960s with drivers like Ronnie Sox, Dick Landy, Butch Leal and Judy Lilly.

NSS's roots go back to the early 1980s, when retired Super Stock racers Dave Duell, Arlen Vanke and others started exhibition racing 1960s style Super Stock at nostalgia racing events. The popularity of the class evolved into a category of drag racing with hundreds of cars and drivers competing in Championship series, and large nostalgia drag racing events.

The spirit of NSS drag racing has the same models of cars that raced Super Stock between 1959 and 1969—but with certain safety equipment updates. The cubic inch displacement of the engines in Nostalgia Super Stock is not a tech item, and motors as large as 620 cubic inches (10 L) has these cars running as quick as 8-seconds in the quarter mile, at speeds over 150 miles per hour (241 km/h).

While there are many different series, clubs, and events running NSS—the rules most run were developed and agreed by representatives from most of the clubs, and universal at most NSS events.

The largest annual NSS race is the Dave Duell Classic (named in honor of Dave Duell), which has seen as many as 90 Nostalgia Super Stock cars compete in what is considered the class's national event. The event is currently run in the fall at Beechbend Raceway in Bowling Green, Kentucky, in conjunction with the National Muscle Car Association. Dave Duell's son, Doug, organizes the event which draws competitors from all over the country.

Some of the more popular cars currently running in NSS include Drag'n Wag'n, Texas Whale, Hustling Hooser, and the Big Red Ram.

== Class description ==
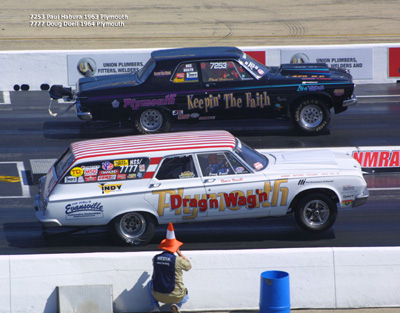
Pair of NSS Cars compete at the Monster Mopar Weekend

Nostalgia Super Stock is an index-style foot brake only class for the year models, body styles, and engine combinations which raced in the A/FX and Super Stock classes of the '60s. Exceptions in the authenticity of these cars will be allowed, for instance those relating to safety, equality in performance, availability, and durability. Sandbagging, excessive braking near the finish line or excessive mph for a given e.t. is subject to result in a disqualification. The class will qualify by elapsed time closest to index, be paired according to qualifying positions, and then advance to eliminations.

== Eligible year models and body styles ==
The following is a list of cars/engines, which are allowed to compete in the Nostalgia Super Stock class:

- AMC AMX: 1968 - 1969; 390
- Chevrolet Full Bodied: 1959-64; 348 & 409s, Z11 427
- Chevrolet Full Bodied: 1965-67; 396-454
- Chevrolet Chevelle: 1964 - 1967; 396-454
- Pontiac Full Bodied: 1959-67; 389-455
- Tempest/GTO: 1962-67; 389-455
- Ford Full Bodied: 1959-67; 390-427
- Ford Thunderbolt: 1964; 427
- Fairlane/Comet/Cyclone/Falcon: 1963-67; 390, 427
- Dodge/Plymouth Full Bodied: 1960-67; 383-440 wedge
- Dodge/Plymouth Full Bodied: 1964-67; Hemi
- Buick Full Bodied: 1960-67; 401-455
- Skylark GS: 1964-67; 400-401-455
- Chevelle: 1964-67; 396-454
- Oldsmobile Full Bodied: 1960-67; 394-400-455
- Cutlass/442: 1964-67; 400-455
- Dart/Barracuda: 1967-69; 383-440
- Dart/Barracuda: 1968; 426 Hemi

== Dave Duell Classic ==
The Dave Duell Classic is the world's largest drag racing event for Nostalgia Super Stock drag racing. It is considered to be the NSS Nationals, with as many as 90 Nostalgia Super Stock cars competing.

The event originally began as the NSS Racing class of the Monster Mopar Weekend back in 1990, and was administered by Dave Duell, who was a Super Stock racer (and then Chrysler/Plymouth dealer) back in the 60s. It was the only class of drag racing at the Monster Mopar Weekend open to all makes of race cars that fit in the strict Nostalgia Super Stock rules. The Monster Mopar Weekend was held at Gateway International Raceway the week after Labor Day each year, just outside St. Louis. The event grew to over 60 cars when Dave Duell last raced in the event in September 2005.

Dave died a few months later, in December 2005. For 2006, the NSS racing portion of the Monster Mopar Weekend was renamed the Dave Duell Classic, and Dave's son Doug took over the administration of the event.

In 2010, Gateway closed, forcing the Monster to move to the race track in Indianapolis, In. About 90 NSS car competed in the last Dave Duell Classic held in conjunction with the Monster Mopar Weekend at Gateway. One of the secrets of the success of the Dave Duell Classic, was its central location. As such, the event moved to its new home with the NMCA's race at Beechbend Raceway in Bowling Green, KY.

In addition to the NSS drag racing that is popular with both the drivers and the fans, the NSS drivers are treated to a sponsored Driver's Dinner on Saturday night, immediately following Class Eliminations. At the dinner swag donated to the event is raffled to the drivers, and a collection is taken up for Dave's favorite charity Santa Clothes.

Sunday is when all of the NSS Indexes compete in Eliminations for the winner of the event. The Dave Duell Classic is not only the most popular of NSS races, but has the Class' highest purse.

== History ==
=== The Foundation, 1955 to 1985 ===
The early practitioners of Nostalgia Super Stock drag racing are shrouded in mystery and the exact beginnings are hard to discern.

In clear contrast, the original source of the sport is clear.

For many World War II military veterans, and in increasing numbers, Korean War veterans and post-WW II 'Baby Boomers,' American automobile culture became the highlight of their young and middle-age lives - complete with both home-built and later on, Detroit-produced available-to-the-public 'muscle' cars, paraded nightly at drive-in restaurants and raced on weekends at the drag strip.

Started in the sales competition between the major American automobile manufacturers General Motors, Ford and Chrysler in the 1950s and 1960s, fueled by low cost oil and the horsepower available from ever larger and more powerful V-8 engines underneath two carburetors, and administered by sanctioning organizations such as the National Hot Rod Association - Stock, Super Stock, Top Stock and Junior Stock Eliminator racing was both a participant and spectator racing favorite in a 'Golden Age' from approximately 1955 until 1971.

In this original era, Stock Eliminator (established 1955) and Super Stock Eliminator (established 1957) race cars were limited to design specifications as factory produced, including maximum engine sizes and other restrictions on cylinder heads, intake manifolds, camshaft and valve train components and wheels/tires.

These cars, many street-driven to the strip and then (with good fortune) back home after the race, were grouped in fast-to-slow alphabetical classes (A/S, B/S, C/S, etc.) determined by horsepower-to-weight factors in wide ranges.

In 1960, optional classes (A/SA, B/SA, C/SA, etc.) for cars equipped with automatic transmissions were added.

The nearly universal competition format on the track was 'heads-up' racing - both cars leave the starting line at the same time, no handicap, and the first one to the finish line is deemed the winner.

At first, elapsed times in the 16 to 13-second range, and later on, 12 and 11 seconds for a quarter-mile standard distance, were considered remarkable.

With time, however, the competitive spirit between manufacturers and also between participants to always go faster increased the pressure for more and more performance.

Numerous and complex engineering changes were implemented, sometimes available as 'special' products sold over-the-counter at dealership parts departments.

For some original manufacturers, the power game was also played at a higher level, with complete 'package' cars, designed to be highly potent for racing but practically unusable as normal transportation.

Whether just 'bodies-in-white,' subcontracted to fabrication and/or assembly vendors, built in off-site but company-controlled facilities sometimes described as 'skunkworks' or actually assembly-line produced in the factory, these 'packages' were sometimes delivered to 'insiders' with special connections or knowledge.

Or the cars were delivered directly to commercial dealers for sale to the public with the unwritten but common understanding that these vehicles could – and would - only be used for racing.

This evolution led to the establishment by NHRA of the Optional Super Stock (O/SS, 1961), Super Super Stock (SS/S, 1962) and Factory Experimental (FX, also 1962) categories, followed by Modified Production (MP, 1963), in an effort to keep pace with the fast-moving technology.

Also in 1963, in cooperation with other governing national and international authorities, NHRA limited maximum engine size to 427 cubic inches (7 liters) and in 1964, started using its own horsepower factors, mainly to correct notoriously low ratings from the manufacturers.

By 1965, some of these factory and privateer purpose-built FX vehicles, like the long-established 'Gasser' and 'Altered' classes, featured changed wheelbases, fuel injection and forced air induction (blowers) - configurations not even an infinite amount of rationalization could justify as 'Stock' or even 'Super Stock.'

In 1966, NHRA put the increasingly radical FX cars – some now fueled with nitromethane - into their own eliminator, officially called 'Experimental Stock.' But popularly they had been called 'Funny Cars' for some time, reflecting a common comment, "That car sure looks funny."

The following year, NHRA formally established 'Funny Car' as a separate eliminator.

Also in 1967, NHRA redefined Super Stock as a division within Stock Eliminator, adding 10 classes based on horsepower-to-weight factors. In addition, on-track competition was conducted with handicapped starts based on national elapsed time records.

This new system was a major change, greatly increasing the number of vehicles eligible for Super Stock - in part by now allowing former stock-only combinations the additional power potential of aftermarket intake manifolds and any camshaft and valve train components and the increased traction efficiency of any size rear tire/wheel assembly which would fit into the stock wheel well.

Also included were big-block powered 'pony cars,' such as the Ford Mustang and Chevrolet Camaro and eventually the Plymouth Barracuda, Dodge Dart and Challenger models and the AMX from American Motors.

In 1968, NHRA continued the expansion, increasing to 34 classes in Stock Eliminator and 12 in Super Stock, and also allowing larger engine sizes except in SS/A and SS/AA, which retained the 427 cubic inch limit.

Many observers agree the pinnacle of both sales and track competition as defined by vehicle brand identification was reached in the 1970-71 period following the 1969 birth of the 500 cubic inch 'heads-up' Pro Stock class, a direct descendant of both the quickest Super Stock cars and the widespread dissatisfaction with handicapped competition.

But the automotive party – 'Bye, Bye, Miss American Pie' as expressed in Don McLean's song – ended after the oil price shocks of the early 1970s and the subsequent chaotic economic conditions of the next 15 years made mass-produced muscle obsolete.

For "Pro" racing with the NHRA, Nostalgia Super Stock evolved into Pro Stock and FX evolved into Funny Car.

=== The Revival, 1985 to 2010 ===
The factory supported Super Stock and Factory Experimental racing had faded away. But the cars, the sounds, the looks - and despite the growing pains, how much fun it all had been – remained sharp and vibrant memories for some. Just as the dispute between the first Top Fuel racer to ever achieve 200 mph in the quarter mile has many argue that it was "Big Daddy" Don Garlits, or Conrad "Connie" Kalleta, or Chris "the Golden Greek" Karamesines, The true origin of the first Nostalgia Super Stock event is the source of major disputes between clubs claiming they were the first to coin the phrase "NSS" and/or "Nostalgia Super Stock".

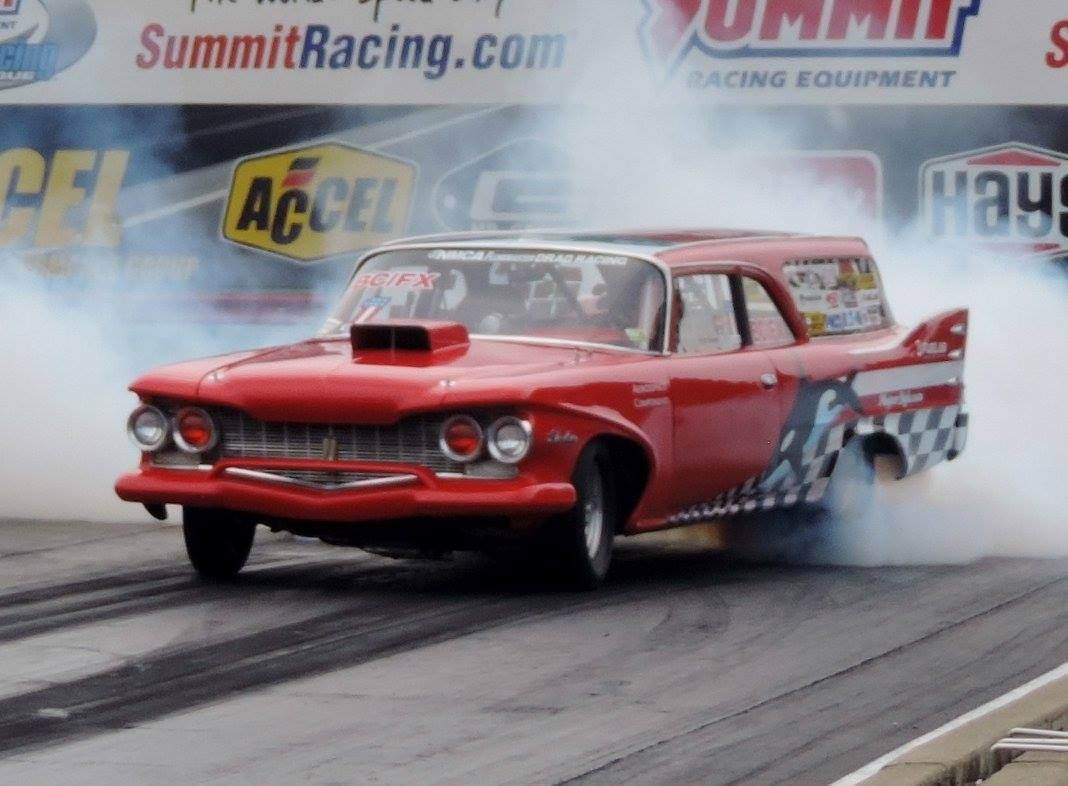
NSS Car (Texas Whale) performing burnout

Various claims include the below by the midwest club Nostalgia Super Stock, Inc.

According to Jim Brandon, a long-time NSS racer and automotive instructor at Linn State Technical College, by the mid-1980s there were several individuals who had started to hazily revive the spirit of the original era.

Whether acquiring an unwanted factory original or producing a clone car from salvageable and/or reproduction parts, some started racing what would now be called NSS cars, competing informally in the central area of the State of Missouri.

And with increased documentation from later in the decade, the visibility improves.

Dave Campbell, the secretary of The Midwest Nostalgia Super Stock Association which later became Nostalgia Super Stock Inc. recalled, "In the mid to late 1980s, Super Chevy Magazine published a series of stories highlighting technical information on the Chevrolet 409 W-design motor."

The 409 (cubic inches) engine was one of the giants of early 1960s Super Stock and FX racing, along with other factory 'big block' competitors, the 421 Pontiacs, the 426 Max Wedge and then the 426 Hemi MoPars (Dodge and Plymouth) and the 427 FE and later the 'Cammer' Fords.

"These stories led to more old-style Super Stock 409 cars being built, with six racers putting on an exhibition match race during the Super Chevy Sunday event at Indianapolis Raceway Park in 1987," said Campbell.

Also a veteran of the General Motors (Leeds) assembly plant in Kansas City, Missouri where he worked a 30-year career from the 1950s through the 1980s, Campbell knew this combination well. Inspired with first-hand knowledge from both owning a new 409 back in 1963 and his factory experience, he built a replica 1963 Chevrolet Bel-Air car named 'Faded Memories.'

At the invitation of Doug Marion, the editor of Super Chevy Magazine, Campbell joined six other 409 racers, Jim Goodwin 'Pre Historic Rat', Clint & Matt Murphy 'Armortek,' Don Evans 'Golden Rod,' John Barber 'Barber John', and Bill Burge 'Living Legend,' at The Super Chevy Show at IRP in July 1988.

In May 1989, another Chevrolet 409 racer, Russ Campbell, contacted Len Greco, a promoter who was producing 'Muscle From The Past' events at Gateway International Raceway (Madison, Illinois), and suggested their cars might be a good fit for his program.

Greco agreed and shortly after hosted Dave Campbell, Russ Campbell, Leroy Fly with a 1962 Chevrolet, and Rick Johnson with a 1962 Pontiac in an exhibition format at the St. Louis area track.

In July 1989, Dave Campbell and others did a show for The National Muscle Car Association, then owned by Chuck Green, at its first annual 'High Performance Showdown' event at Beech Bend Park in Bowling Green, Kentucky.

Later that year, Greco asked Johnson to organize an eight-car field for an exhibition race the following spring. That success led to another Greco-promoted race at Kansas City International Raceway in July 1990.

On July 28, 1990, a meeting of racers was held at Dave Campbell's residence in Kearney, Missouri, to discuss an outline of formal organization.

The group's primary purpose was to provide a complete entertainment package – 'heads-up' exhibition match racing, car display and interaction with spectators - to track owners and promoters.

Under the name suggested by Dave Campbell and later approved by vote, The Midwest Nostalgia Super Stock Association published its first newsletter, named 'Nostalgia News' on April 7, 1991 and stated a membership of 21 racers.

The association's first match race event took place May 4–5 at Gateway for Greco.

The second newsletter, dated July 5, 1991, named Rick Johnson as Chairman of the Board along with members Joe Zajac, Larry Kaufman, Ray Bisig, Craig Dawson, Mike Riefer, Frank Zalud, Jim Whittenburg, Russ Campbell, Don Shaffer, Dave Campbell, Jim Hagenhoff, John Brady and Phil Hayenga.

In August, MNSSA made its first appearance at the Goodguys Rod and Custom Association's race at Indianapolis Raceway Park.

The third issue of 'Nostalgia News' - September 4, 1991 - was written under Dave Campbell's byline.

"By then our group had been featured in several magazine articles and Russ Smiltnieks had acquired NMCA from Green," said Dave Campbell. "Smiltnieks asked our group to do some exhibition racing at Memphis (Tennessee) Motorsports Park in September as NMCA was interested in offering an NSS class for 1992. They wanted to see our performance and the reaction to it."

NMCA was favorably impressed with the result, enough to establish its own rules in consultation with MNSSA and also schedule a four-race series for 1992. Each season since, NMCA has offered NSS in addition to its numerous modern classes, changing to an open competition index-style format in 1994.

The original MNSSA continued to produce 'heads-up' match race programs until 1997, when an internal disagreement caused the group to split.

One faction, including Jim Whittenburg, Terry Whittenburg, Rick Johnson, Russ Campbell, Shaffer, Zalud and Dave Johnson, took the original MNSSA name and occasionally produced shows until 2006.

On November 15, 1997, the remaining faction, including original founders Dave Campbell, Zajac, Kaufman, Bisig and Hayenga, held a reorganizational meeting at the residence of Larry Quinn in Springfield, Illinois, and were joined by other members, Richard Anderson, Bob Kokenes, Jerry Zeman, Dallas Peffley, Tom Ponder, Jim Richardson, John Rousset, Steve Snyder and Mike Swanson in establishing a renamed organization called Nostalgia Super Stock Inc.

Also in 1997, NMCA was sold to Petersen Publishing, adding more to a complex web of ownership intrigue, drama, misunderstanding and mystery which still continues to confound many racers and the public.

In 1998, a former MNSSA member, Tony DePillo, co-founded the National Street Car Association, which included NSS and a similar class named Pro Nostalgia for faster cars. Sometimes in association with NMCA and sometimes not, NSCA produced events that included NSS for 10 years before it disbanded.

Meanwhile, the popularity of nostalgia drag racing in general and NSS specifically, had continued to grow, spreading to the eastern and southern regions of the United States. This gave rise to other organizations, such as the East Coast Nostalgia Super Stock Association, 422 Motorsports, and the Texas Outsiders.

In addition, subset individual events and season-long series related to the specific brands, for example, the Ford Nationals, Pontiac Nationals, Mopar Nationals and the Chrysler Classic series with its Max Wedge and Hemi Super Stock classes, had grown popular.

An independent event, Monster Mopar Weekend, has included NSS since 1996 and until 2010 was widely considered to be the annual 'national' event for the sport.

In 2006, NSS within the MMW race was named The Dave Duell Nostalgia Super Stock Nationals in memory of Dave Duell, a long-time participant and administrator in NHRA Stock and NSS, and an alumnus of the original MNSSA.

=== Various rules committees ===
In 2008, the Nostalgia Super Stock National Association was formed with representatives from various NSS groups, including Dave Duell's son, Doug, in an effort to establish nationally recognized definitions and rules for the category.

Since that year, the NSSNA has provided rules authority, technical inspection and race management services for the category to NHRA at its annual National Hot Rod Reunion event at Beech Bend Park; for the Dave Duell Classic; for the MMW events and a number of other free-standing races at various 1/8th-mile tracks.

However, when one of the clubs attempted a failed power struggle to take ownership of the NSSNA Rules Committee for their own, all other members (including Doug Duell) resigned. October 19, 2015 three of members (Doug Duell, Jim Netherland, and Clay Kossuth) who had resigned from NSSNA formed a new rules organization, which is now recognized as the Uniform Rules Governing Nostalgia Super Stock by events such as The Dave Duell Classic, NMCA, and other well known event promoters with a NSS class racing.

=== Past, present and future, 2011 to 2013 ===
NMCA continues to offer its long-time and wide-ranging NSS series, which determines what is generally considered to be an individual national champion.

Just possible geographic expansion from the eastern half of the country has turned into potential as NMCA now has four events west of the Mississippi River. While NSS is not a current category offered, it could become one in future seasons.

The 2012 sale and of subsequent reopening of the closed race tracks at Memphis and St. Louis was a positive development.

With new ownership, Monster Mopar Weekend (MMW) has two events each year at Indianapolis, In and Norwalk, Oh.

The Victory Performance Midwest Nostalgia Super Stock series, featuring six races, has been active for several years.

In 2015, The Southwest Heritage Racing Association began a series of races featuring Nostalgia Stock Racing in Texas and Louisiana.

A relatively new entry to feature Nostalgia Super Stock Racing is the annual Atlanta $10,000 - held in Commerce, Ga.

These all are hopeful signs that 'Reliving Dreams in Fields of Gold,' through NSS will continue.

== Summary ==
Current NSS cars, most constructed as post-era replicas or 'clones' but also some surviving factory originals, have unlimited engine size and other modern engineering which makes them technically similar to the former NHRA Modified Production category.

These allowances make possible performances far beyond their original capabilities with elapsed times now as quick as mid-8 seconds and top speeds exceeding 150 mph.

Seven general principles apply: historical accuracy (American factory created/manufactured/supported makes and models); multiple carburetion preferred; intake manifolds produced by metal casting; maximum rear tire width designation of 10.5 inches; footbrake only, no transmission brake permitted; no electronic racing devices allowed (except ignition boxes); and competition conducted by class on established elapsed time indexes.

Because in the original era (until 1967) vehicles were de facto factory 'purpose-built' and the competition format was 'heads-up,' some participants say that late 1960s common production models and 'pony cars' should not be eligible and also that NSS racing done on index or bracket racing elapsed time 'dial-ins' is not correct.

Accordingly, there is ongoing debate about these issues and also about what other elements should be allowed into or excluded from NSS.

And the appearances - the ride heights, the 'mag-style' aftermarket wheels, the stock dashboards and the colorful and vibrant period-correct paint and graphics, including the historical popularity of naming the cars. Names such as 'Psychotic ReAction,' 'Mad Torquer,' 'Old Reliable,' 'Wedge Hog,' 'Asphalt Angel,' 'Asphalt Elephant,' 'Better than Nothin,' 'Color Me Gone,' 'Rebel Rouser,' 'Fugly,' 'We Haul,' 'American Muscle,' 'Lost Dream,' 'Showtime,' 'Fire and Faith,' 'Keeping the Faith,' 'The Other Woman,' 'Lady Max,' 'Max Attack,' 'Moonshiner,' 'She's Furyous,' and the 'Drag'n Wag'n' are some of the current reflections of the era and now as in earlier times are limited only by the owner's imagination and creativity in wordplay.

What is considered unique to nostalgia drag racing in general and NSS specifically is concept of 'the active past.'

In contrast to the atmosphere of a museum or the more alive and approachable format of a 'car show,' current NSS racers and cars are not static symbols of American history or just re-enactors, but are fully functional in their natural intent and environment, performing in actual race track competition.

-----------------------------

(Author's Note: Because NSS is a work in progress, so is its documentation. Therefore, this story is not a complete and definitive history. There are other organizations and individual events which put NSS-type vehicles on the track. I invite and welcome further research and documents from any knowledgeable source with contact through Nostalgia Super Stock Inc., nostalgiasuperstock.com; through The Nostalgia Super Stock National Association at 4000 E. Division St. Evansville IN 47715, (812) 473-0215; or through The National Muscle Car Association, 3518 West Lake Center Drive, Santa Ana CA 92704, (714) 444-2426, nmcadigital.com or promedia.com)

=== Sources ===
Archives, The Midwest Nostalgia Super Stock Association, Dave Campbell, Secretary, 1991 to 1997

'High Performance: The Culture and Technology of Drag Racing 1950-1990,' by Robert C. Post, published 1994 by The Johns Hopkins University Press, Baltimore, MD

Archives, Nostalgia Super Stock Inc., Dave Campbell, Secretary 1997 to 2010 and present Historian

'Super Stock: Drag Racing the Family Sedan,' by Larry Davis, published 2001 by CarTech Books, North Branch, MN'

American Drag Racing,' by Robert Genat, published 2001 by MBI Publishing Co., St. Paul, MN'

Mustang Race Cars,' by Dr. John Craft, published 2002 by MBI Publishing Co., St. Paul, MN

Interviews with Dave Duell - June 2005 and August 2005

Interview with Jim Brandon - September 2006

Archives, Nostalgia Super Stock National Association - 2008 through 2013

Popular Hot Rodding Magazine, 'National Muscle Car Association – Changing to Fit the Need,' by Rod Short - February 2009

Interviews with Doug Duell – February 2010 and March 2010

Interviews with Dave Campbell, Larry Kaufman, Joe Zajac - March 2010

=== Undocumented internet references ===
Gordon Marks – "I'll hafta think a while. I started in '91 I believe at Don Lamoine's (68 AMX-white) urging. We raced initially in Jerry Kelly's Muscle Car Nationals (I may call Jerry & ask what he remembers besides losing a bunch of $'s on 2 rainouts) then NMCA." - Gordon Marks, 64 Biscayne

Steve 1118 – "The first 'real' NSS race that I recall was the old Musclecar Showdown/Nostalgia Nationals run by Bill Bartell of Youngstown, Ohio, and it was held at Quaker City Dragway in Salem, Ohio. I believe the inaugural event was held in 1992." One of the main draws was the "Field of Dreams", which is now NSS. The rules were identical to what they have today, and it was well attended with thirty some odd cars. Among the hitters were the late Bill Banks' "Boppin Bear" 64 GTO; Derek Smith's ex-Jere Stahl 67 RO Plymouth, Jim Wittenburg's "Precious Metal" Galaxie, and so many others it is hard to remember them all. My first time was in 1994, and I lost in the second round to Doug Wright, who went on to win the NMCA Championship that year. "I've been racing my same 65 Hemi Dodge for forty one years, and that is the first 'dedicated' NSS race of any size that I can recall."
