= James H. Wakatsuki =

American judge and politician(1929–1992)

James Hiroji Wakatsuki
- 若月 比呂司

Justice of the Supreme Court of Hawaii
- In office September 7, 1983 – September 22, 1992

3rd Speaker of the Hawaii House of Representatives
- In office 1975–1980
- Preceded by: Tadao Beppu
- Succeeded by: Henry H. Peters

Member of the Hawaii House of Representatives
- In office 1959–1980

Personal details
- Born: August 17, 1929 Kalihi, Honolulu, Territory of Hawaii, U.S.
- Died: September 22, 1992 (aged 63)
- Spouse: Irene Yoshimura
- Education: University of Hawaiʻi; University of Wisconsin Law School
- Nickname: The Opihi

James Hiroji Wakatsuki (Japanese: 若月 比呂司, August 17, 1929 – September 22, 1992) was a Japanese American politician and a justice of the Supreme Court of Hawaii from September 7, 1983, to September 22, 1992. His nickname was "The Opihi," after the well-known, difficult to move, mollusk.

== Early life and education ==
Wakatsuki was born on August 17, 1929, in Kalihi, a district of Honolulu, Hawaii to immigrants from Japan. He studied at Farrington High School and the University of Hawaiʻi. He joined the U.S. Army partway through his university studies, enlisting from 1948 to 1949. After leaving the army, Wakatsuki finished his degree at Bowling Green University. In 1954, Wakatsuki graduated from the University of Wisconsin Law School.

== Career ==
In 1955, Wakatsuki worked at the Renegotiation office in Washington DC. He then worked as a clerk at the Hawaii Territorial Legislature. Wakatsuki opened a law office in Kalihi in 1957.

Wakatsuki was elected to the Territorial House of Representatives in 1958. By 1975 he was the Speaker of the House and had gained the nickname "The Opihi" because once he took a position, he would not budge, much like the difficult to move mollusk. During his time in office, Wakatsuki also maintained his law office and did community service with the Kalihi YMCA and the Lions Club. He was also president of the Honolulu Junior Japanese Chamber of Commerce.

He retired from politics in 1980 after being appointed the Hawaii State Circuit Court judge by George Ariyoshi. Wakatsuki was nominated for a seat on the Supreme Court of Hawaii in 1983. Prosecutor Charles Marsland criticized Wakatsuki's legal and political experience, but he was confirmed by the Senate and joined the Supreme Court on September 7, 1983.

== Personal life ==
In 1953, Wakatsuki married Irene Yoshimura. They had three children.

Wakatsuki died of liver failure while in office on September 22, 1992.

Political offices
Preceded by	Justice of the Supreme Court of Hawaii; 1983–1992	Succeeded by
