= List of speakers of the Hawaii House of Representatives =

Speaker of Hawaii House of Representatives Ka Luna Hoʻomalu o ka Hale ʻAhaʻōlelo Makaʻāinana

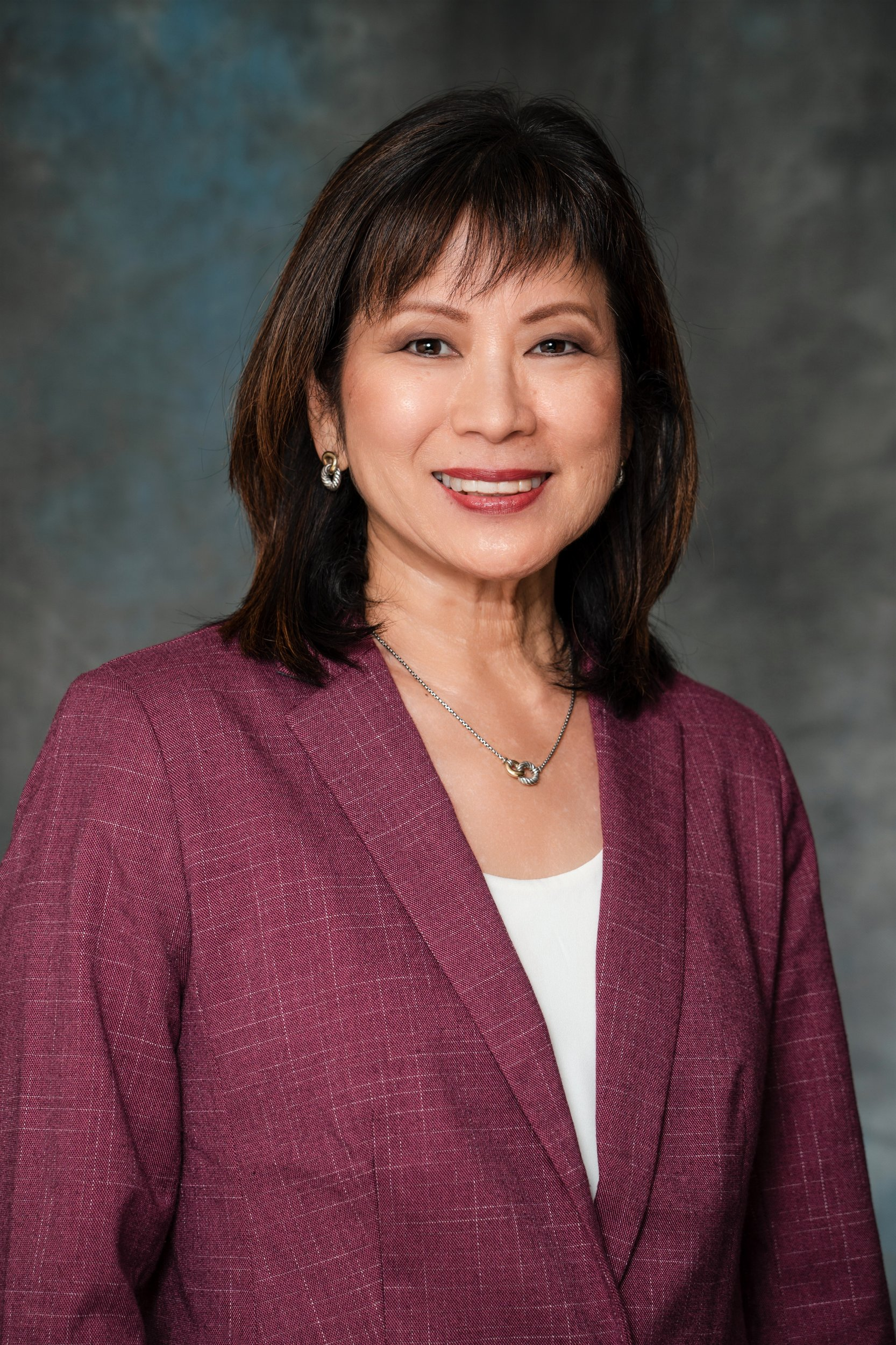
- Incumbent; Nadine Nakamura since November 6, 2024
- Status: Presiding officer
- Seat: Hawaii State Capitol, Honolulu
- Appointer: Hawaii House of Representatives
- Succession: Third
- Website: www.capitol.hawaii.gov

The Speaker of the Hawaii House of Representatives (Hawaiian: Ka Luna Hoʻomalu o ka Hale ʻAhaʻōlelo Makaʻāinana) is the speaker (presiding officer) of the Hawaii House of Representatives.

== Territorial House of Representatives ==
Name	Party	Term
Joseph Apukai Akina	Home Rule	1901
Frederick William Beckley	Republican	1903–1904
Eric Alfred Knudsen	Republican	1905–1906
Henry Lincoln Holstein	Republican	1907–1921
Clarence Hyde Cooke	Republican	1923–1924
Norman K. Lyman	Republican	1925–1926
Clarence Hyde Cooke	Republican	1927–1928
Frederick Dwight Lowrey	Republican	1929–1930
Roy A. Vitousek	Republican	1931–1932
Herbert Nikela Ahuna	Republican	1933–1934
Roy A. Vitousek	Republican	1935–1940
Arthur A. Akina	Republican	1941–1942
Roy A. Vitousek	Republican	1943–1944
Manuel G. Paschoal	Republican	1945–1948
Hiram Leong Fong	Republican	1949–1954
Charles Ernest Kauhane	Democratic	1955–1956
O. Vincent Esposito	Democratic	1957–1958
Elmer F. Cravalho	Democratic	1959

== Hawaiʻi State House of Representatives ==
Name	Term	Party
Elmer F. Cravalho	1959–1967	Democratic
Tadao Beppu	1968–1974	Democratic
James H. Wakatsuki	1975–1980	Democratic
Henry H. Peters	1981–1986	Democratic
Richard Kawakami	1987 (Note: (died in office; Emilio Alcon named Acting Speaker))	Democratic
Daniel J. Kihano	1987–1992	Democratic
Joseph M. Souki	1993–1999	Democratic
Calvin Say	1999–2013	Democratic
Joseph M. Souki	2013–2017	Democratic
Scott Saiki	2017–2024	Democratic
Nadine Nakamura	2024–	Democratic

== Vice speakers ==
The Vice Speaker of the Hawaii House of Representatives is the second-highest presiding officer of the Hawaii House of Representatives. In the absence of the Speaker of the Hawaii House of Representative, the vice speaker assumes the powers and duties of the presiding officer.

Name	Term	Party
Manuel S. Henriques	1959–1962	Democratic
William M. Furtado	1962–1964	Democratic
Tadao Beppu	1965–1967	Democratic
Barney B. Menor	1968–1970	Democratic
Pedro de la Cruz	1968–1974	Democratic
Richard Garcia	1975–1976	Democratic
Daniel J. Kihano	1977–1984	Democratic
Marshall K. Ige	1985–1986	Democratic
Emilio S. Alcon	1987–1990	Democratic
Peter K. Apo	1991–1992	Democratic
Jackie Young	1993–1994	Democratic
Paul T. Oshiro	1995–1998	Democratic
Marcus R. Oshiro	1999–2000	Democratic
Sylvia J. Luke	2001–2004	Democratic
K. Mark Takai	2005–2006	Democratic
Jon Riki Karamatsu	2007	Democratic
Pono Chong	2008	Democratic
Michael Y. Magaoay	2009–2010	Democratic
Joey Manahan	2011–2012	Democratic
John M. Mizuno	2013–2017	Democratic
Della Au Belatti	2017	Democratic
Mark Nakashima	2017–2020	Democratic
John M. Mizuno	2021–2022	Democratic
Greggor Ilagan	2022–2024	Democratic
Linda Ichiyama	2024–	Democratic

== See also ==
- List of Hawaii state legislatures
- Legislature of the Hawaiian Kingdom
