= Richard Kawakami =

American businessman and politician

5th Speaker of the Hawaii House of Representatives
- In office January 21, 1987 – March 8, 1987
- Preceded by: Henry H. Peters
- Succeeded by: Emilio Alcon (acting)

Member of the Hawaii House of Representatives from the 51st district 18th (1968–1970) 25th (1970–1974) 27th (1974–1982)
- In office 1968–1987 Serving with Anthony C. Baptiste Jr. (1968–1970); Tony T. Kunimura (1968–1982); Dennis R. Yamada (1972–1982)
- Succeeded by: Bertha Kawakami

Personal details
- Born: February 22, 1931 Waimea, Hawaii, U.S.
- Died: March 8, 1987 (aged 56) Lanai, Hawaii, U.S.
- Party: Democratic
- Spouse: Bertha Kawakami
- Children: 3

Richard A. Kawakami (February 22, 1931 – March 8, 1987) was an American businessman and politician.

Born in Waimea, Kauai County, Hawaii, Kawakami received his bachelor's degree from University of Hawaiʻi and his master's degree from New York University. Kawakami was the president of the Big Save Groceries in Kauai County. Kawakami served on the Kauai County Council and was a Democrat. Kawakami served in the Hawaii House of Representatives from 1968 until his death in 1987. He served as speaker of the house in 1987 at the time of his death. Kawakami died suddenly of a heart attack while on a hunting trip on Lanai. His wife Bertha succeeded him in the Hawaii Legislature.
