= Scott Saiki =

American politician

- Saiki in 2024

10th Speaker of the Hawaii House of Representatives
- In office May 4, 2017 – November 5, 2024
- Preceded by: Joseph M. Souki
- Succeeded by: Nadine Nakamura

President of the National Conference of State Legislatures
- In office 2021–2022
- Preceded by: Robin Vos
- Succeeded by: Scott Bedke and Robin Vos

Majority Leader of the Hawaii House of Representatives
- In office January 16, 2013 – May 4, 2017
- Preceded by: Pono Chong
- Succeeded by: Della Au Belatti

Member of the Hawaii House of Representatives from the 25th district 20th (1994–2002) 22nd (2002–2012) 26th (2012–2022)
- In office November 8, 1994 – November 5, 2024
- Preceded by: David Hagino
- Succeeded by: Kim Coco Iwamoto

Personal details
- Born: July 17, 1964 (age 62) Honolulu, Hawaii, U.S.
- Party: Democratic
- Education: University of Hawaii, Manoa (BA, JD)

Scott Kazuo Saiki (born July 17, 1964) is an American attorney and politician. He has served as a Democratic member of the Hawaii House of Representatives, representing the state's 26th district. He served as majority leader from 2013 to 2017 and as speaker of the Hawaii House of Representatives from 2017 to 2024.

In the 2024 primary election, Saiki lost his seat in a close race with Kim Coco Iwamoto.

== Early life and education ==
Saiki was born in Honolulu, Hawai‘i on July 17, 1964 and grew up in Kailua, Hawaii. He attended Hawaii Baptist Academy in Honolulu.

Saiki earned a Bachelor of Arts degree in Political Science from the University of Hawaiʻi at Mānoa and a Juris Doctor from the William S. Richardson School of Law in 1991. In 1988, he was a student intern for U.S. Senator Daniel Akaka. As a law student, he advocated for requiring students to complete a pro bono program.

== Early career ==
After graduating from law school, Saiki worked as an attorney, practicing disability law and personal injury litigation.

He is a former staff attorney at the Legal Aid Society of Hawaii and assistant to state Representative David Hagino.

== Hawaii House of Representatives ==
In 1994, Saiki was first elected to the Hawaii House of Representatives to represent House District 20, an urban district spanning from Kapahulu to Moiliili.

From 2013 to 2017, Saiki served as the majority leader. After Speaker Joe Souki resigned, Saiki was elected Speaker of the Hawaii House of Representatives on May 4, 2017. In addition to serving in office, he continues to practice disability law.

== Community involvement and affiliations ==
- Member, Board of Directors, Advocates for Public Interest Law
- Member, Hawaii State Bar Association
- Member, Mōʻiliʻili Community Center
- President of the National Conference of State Legislatures (2021–22)
- Chairperson, Japan-Hawaii Legislators’ Friendship Association

== Personal life ==
Saiki enjoys swimming. He and his wife Patsy have a cat, Emi.

== Electoral history ==
=== 2014 ===
Hawaii’s 26th District House of Representatives election, 2014
| Party | Candidate | Votes | % |
|---|---|---|---|
| Democratic | Scott Saiki | 3,858 | 68.6 |
| Republican | Eric B. Marshall | 1,768 | 31.4 |
| Total votes | | 5,626 | 100 |

=== 2016 ===
In the 2016 election, Saiki ran unopposed in both the Democratic primary and general election.

=== 2018 ===
In the 2018 election, Saiki once again ran unopposed in both the Democratic primary and general election.

=== 2020 ===
Hawaii’s 26th District House of Representatives election, 2020
| Party | Candidate | Votes | % |
|---|---|---|---|
| Democratic | Scott Saiki | 3,393 | 51.3 |
| Democratic | Kim Coco Iwamoto | 3,226 | 48.7 |
| Total votes | | 6,619 | 100 |

=== 2022 ===
In the 2022 Democratic Primary Saiki once again faced Kim Coco Iwamoto for the nomination. Due to redistricting Saiki was placed in the 25th District which contain Ala Moana and Kakaako. Saiki narrowly won with 51% of the vote. He faced Rob Novak in the general election.

Hawaii's 25th House District Democratic primary election, 2022
| Party | Candidate | Votes | % |
|---|---|---|---|
| Democratic | Scott Saiki | 2,680 | 51.55% |
| Democratic | Kim Coco Iwamoto | 2,519 | 48.45% |
| Total votes | | 5,199 | 100% |

=== 2024 ===
Hawaii's 25th House District Democratic primary election, 2024
| Party | Candidate | Votes | % |
|---|---|---|---|
| Democratic | Kim Coco Iwamoto | 2,649 | 52.52% |
| Democratic | Scott Saiki | 2,395 | 47.48% |
| Total votes | | 5,044 | 100% |

Political offices
| Preceded by Joseph M. Souki | Speaker of the Hawaii House of Representatives; 2017–2024 | Succeeded by Nadine Nakamura |
