= David Lombardi =

American sports journalist and commentator (born 1988)

David Lombardi (born May 5, 1988), is an American sports journalist. He covers the National Football League's San Francisco 49ers for The San Francisco Standard. Before joining The Standard he worked at ESPN and The Athletic.

== Education ==
Lombardi graduated from Stanford University with a bachelor's degree in 2010, and received a master's in Broadcasting from Boston University in 2011.

== Career ==
A native of Visalia, California, Lombardi started his career covering Stanford sports for KZSU campus radio, serving as its sports director from 2006 until 2010, while an undergraduate, and covering Stanford football games.

After receiving his master's degree in broadcasting, Lombardi began his career at 95.7 The Game, while simultaneously working as a sideline reporter on a freelance basis for stations affiliated with the Comcast Sports Network and joined the Stanford Football pregame show on KNBR, as well as a general freelancer covering Stanford football.

In September 2014, he was hired by ESPN as a writer, pundit and on air-analyst for college football. In 2017, Lombardi was let go during a major layoff at ESPN and began covering the San Francisco 49ers for The Athletic.

Lombardi made his first appearance, representing The Athletic, on the San Francisco 49ers official podcast, You've Got Mail, in 2020.

One of Lombardi's first investigative jobs was to cover the 2018 misdemeanor drug charges and the later felony domestic violence case surrounding 49er Reuben Foster in 2018, the latter of which was ultimately closed.

Since 2021, Lombardi also serves as an adjunct lecturer at the College of Marin, teaching classes about writing for sports media, and using camera technology and social media as part of reporting.

In September of 2024, Lombardi had left The Athletic to join The San Francisco Standard. In moving to the Standard, he was joined by fellow Athletic journalist Tim Kawakami.

== Reception ==
In 2012, Lombardi was listed as one of the top 20 newscasters covering college sports in North America by the Sportcasters Talent Agency.

In June 2022, Lombardi received attention for being one of the pundits that correctly predicted that the 49ers Deebo Samuel would re-sign to the 49ers while Jimmy Garoppolo was on the roster. He provided frequent first-hand updates on the health status of the players.

Lombardi's most controversial prediction that proved true occurred in 2021. He predicted the 49ers would select Trey Lance and not Mac Jones in the 2021 NFL draft. SFGate credited Lombardi as being one of three reporters to make the correct prediction, as the overwhelming majority believed Jones would receive the nod.

In May 2024, Lombardi's 'data-driven' approach was analyzed by pundit Sauvik Banerjee. Banerjee devoted an article to Lombardi's methodology behind the determination that Brock Purdy is a stronger quarterback than Jordan Love.

He was also profiled in an episode of the Paper Trail podcast in 2024.

David Lombardi's work was analyzed in a January 2024 piece by Eric Ting of SFGate. Ting took issue with Lombardi for praising Brock Purdy excessively. Ting wrote that "It might seem dramatic to blame a single writer for an entire ecosystem of takes. But Lombardi has become the conductor of the out-of-control Purdy hype train, and he drives the train in a manner that's downright offensive to neutral observers." A different SFGate journalist, Gabe Fernandez, had previously criticized Lombardi, in an article devoted to him, for apparently using incorrect statistics to back up his pro-Purdy arguments. However, in September 2024, Purdy himself cited the same metrics Lombardi had previously mentioned and encouraged the media to fact check the numbers. A fact check from radio station KNBR verified the numbers, and Fernandez wrote this gave Lombardi "validation" on the issue. Lombardi's coverage of Purdy received further attention in early November of 2022. Lombardi attributes some of the 'unfounded' criticism of Purdy to his nickname, "Mr. Irrelevant". This nickname is given to the last pick of an NFL draft. In a series of tweets, Lombardi stated that "draftism" has distorted the perception of quarterbacks, and pointed out the difference in salary between Purdy ($3.7M over 4 years) and fellow quarterback C. J. Stroud (approximately 10 times that of Purdy) who was an early draft pick.

In February 2025, sports blogger Bret Stuter published an article on the potential salary dispute between the Los Angeles Rams and quarterback Matthew Stafford, referencing video commentary by Lombardi to support his central argument.

In March 2025, Lombardi’s statistical commentary on X about Purdy, specifically that Purdy led the NFL in expected points added (EPA) per play while the Los Angeles Rams “had done this without great QB play”, was analyzed by the SB Nation site Turf Show Times. The article confirmed Lombardi’s raw efficiency numbers but argued that EPA alone can inflate differences once turnover-worthy plays, big-time throws, and overall roster contexts are considered, concluding that the Purdy-over-Stafford gap is “smaller and more nuanced” than Lombardi’s post implied.

Lombardi was stated to be an 'organization man' by fellow sports journalist Chris Beck for giving "the impression" that he has been "teaming up in an unspoken partnership with the Niners' management" as opposed taking a more critical approach in covering the team. In the article, Beck contrasted him with Grant Cohn, another sports commentator who takes a more contrarian and skeptical approach to covering football. In November 2025, Beck followed up with another article contrasting the two. In 2023, Cohn said that he and Lombardi are locked in a feud. As of October 2026, Lombardi has never commented publicly in response to Cohn. In a May 2024 House of Strauss podcast appearance by Cohn was asked whether he felt "threatened" by Lombardi's increasing use of YouTube, which up to then was considered 'Cohn-territory', which Cohn denied. In October 2026, following the San Francisco 49ers’ 32-29 win over the Seattle Seahawks, Cohn accused Lombardi during a postgame YouTube livestream of crossing journalistic ethics by acting as a fan rather than a reporter, specifically claiming that Lombardi hugs and congratulates players in the locker room “as if they won together” instead of attending postgame press conferences. Neither Lombardi nor the San Francisco Standard responded to SFGATE’s requests for comment. While some online commentators agreed with Cohn, per outlet Pro Football Network the majority reacted negatively, with some attributing Cohn's comments to him being envious of Lombardi.

== Personal life ==
According to a KQED feature, Lombardi's earliest memory of the 49ers came in January of 1993, where he remembers his father being upset as the Dallas Cowboys were scoring a long touchdown to win the NFC Championship Game at the end of the 1992 season.

In addition to U.S. citizenship, Lombardi holds Czech citizenship through his mother. He also is fluent in Czech. Lombardi is of Swiss-Italian descent on his father's side. He is married. He and his wife were featured in an edition of NFocus, a lifestyle magazine based in Nashville.

Lombardi is not related to Hall of Fame coach Vince Lombardi, despite the shared surname and rumors of a relationship.
