= Mayoral elections in Honolulu =

Mayoral elections in Honolulu are held every four years to elect the mayor of the City and County of Honolulu, Hawaii, the largest county in Hawaii by population.

Since a 1992 referendum, all local elections in Honolulu are required to be non-partisan. Mayors of Honolulu are limited to two consecutive terms. The incumbent mayor is independent Rick Blangiardi, serving since 2021.

== 2004 ==
=== First round ===
2004 Honolulu mayoral election, first round September 18, 2004
| Candidate | Votes | % |
|---|---|---|
| Duke Bainum | 84,197 | 46.12% |
| Mufi Hannemann | 78,279 | 42.88% |
| Frank Fasi | 17,719 | 9.71% |
| Lillian L. L. W. Hong | 1,095 | 0.60% |
| Terrence Koichi Teruya | 545 | 0.30% |
| Daniel H. Cunningham | 213 | 0.12% |
| Mike Powers | 177 | 0.10% |
| Theodore W. Gibson | 148 | 0.08% |
| Glenn Pinho | 116 | 0.06% |
| Paul Manner | 73 | 0.04% |
| Total votes | 182,562 | 100.00% |

=== Runoff ===
2004 Honolulu mayoral election, runoff November 2, 2004
| Candidate | Votes | % |
|---|---|---|
| Mufi Hannemann | 147,949 | 50.23% |
| Duke Bainum | 146,595 | 49.77% |
| Total votes | 294,544 | 100.005 |

== 2000 ==
Incumbent mayor Jeremy Harris was re-elected on the first round.

2000 Honolulu mayoral election September 23, 2000
| Candidate | Votes | % |
|---|---|---|
| Jeremy Harris (inc.) | 84,197 | 54.10% |
| Mufi Hannemann | 65,652 | 42.18% |
| Frank Fasi | 3,293 | 2.12% |
| Lillian L. L. W. Hong | 1,363 | 0.88% |
| Dicky J. | 346 | 0.22% |
| Mike Powers | 317 | 0.20% |
| Bruce L. Bellows | 279 | 0.18% |
| Larry Hitchcock | 191 | 0.12% |
| Total votes | 155,638 | 100.00% |

== 1996 ==
=== First round ===
1996 Honolulu mayoral election, first round September 21, 1996
| Candidate | Votes | % |
|---|---|---|
| Jeremy Harris | 94,846 | 49.27% |
| Arnold Morgado | 56,241 | 29.21% |
| Frank Fasi | 38,744 | 20.13% |
| Lillian L. L. W. Hong | 1,502 | 0.78% |
| Bruce L. Bellows | 674 | 0.35% |
| Charles Hirayasu | 513 | 0.27% |
| Total votes | 192,520 | 100.00% |

=== Runoff ===
1996 Honolulu mayoral election, runoff November 5, 1996
| Candidate | Votes | % |
|---|---|---|
| Jeremy Harris | 146,034 | 57.32% |
| Arnold Morgado | 108,746 | 42.68% |
| Total votes | 254,780 | 100.00% |

== 1994 special ==
A special election was triggered after the resignation of incumbent Republican mayor Frank Fasi. This was the first mayoral election after a 1992 referendum made local elections in Honolulu nonpartisan.

1994 Honolulu mayoral special election September 17, 1994
| Candidate | Votes | % |
|---|---|---|
| Jeremy Harris | 67,670 | 31.67% |
| Arnold Morgado | 58,018 | 27.16% |
| Ann Kobayashi | 43,367 | 20.30% |
| Gary Gill | 34,522 | 16.16% |
| Mito Alban | 4,136 | 1.94% |
| Whitney T. Anderson | 1,234 | 0.58% |
| Warner K. R. Sutton | 1,193 | 0.59% |
| Dennis O'Connor | 995 | 0.47% |
| Solomon D. K. Naluai | 613 | 0.29% |
| Lillian L. L. W. Hong | 580 | 0.27% |
| Danny Deocampo | 522 | 0.24% |
| Riley K. Medeiros | 275 | 0.13% |
| Felix Guess Jr. | 261 | 0.12% |
| Patricia M. Camara | 230 | 0.11% |
| Total votes | 213,616 | 100.00% |

== 1992 ==
=== Democratic primary ===
1992 Honolulu mayoral Democratic primary election September 19, 1992
| Party | Candidate | Votes | % |
|---|---|---|---|
| Democratic | Dennis O'Connor | 58,279 | 51.10% |
| Democratic | Mike Wilson | 45,204 | 39.63% |
| Democratic | Kekoa David Kaapu | 7,183 | 6.30% |
| Democratic | Jerry Souza | 1,872 | 1.64% |
| Democratic | Molina Ojerio | 1,519 | 1.33% |
| Total votes | | 114,057 | 100.00% |

=== Republican primary ===
1992 Honolulu mayoral Republican primary election September 19, 1992
| Party | Candidate | Votes | % |
|---|---|---|---|
| Republican | Frank Fasi (inc.) | 22,123 | 56.01% |
| Republican | Whitney T. Anderson | 10,481 | 26.54% |
| Republican | Diana Hansen-Young | 6,236 | 15.79% |
| Republican | Charles Y. Hirayasu | 656 | 1.66% |
| Total votes | | 39,496 | 100.00% |

=== Libertarian primary ===
Jack Schweigert won the Libertarian primary unopposed with 728 votes.

=== Nonpartisan primary ===
1992 Honolulu mayoral nonpartisan primary election September 19, 1992
| Party | Candidate | Votes | % |
|---|---|---|---|
| Nonpartisan | Jim Brewer | 477 | 51.62% |
| Nonpartisan | Pat Camar | 272 | 29.44% |
| Nonpartisan | Hilarie I. Miracle | 175 | 18.94% |
| Total votes | | 924 | 100.00% |

=== General election ===
1992 Honolulu mayoral election November 3, 1992
| Party | Candidate | Votes | % |
|---|---|---|---|
| Republican | Frank Fasi (inc.) | 127,939 | 48.59% |
| Democratic | Dennis O'Connor | 124,719 | 47.36% |
| Libertarian | Jack Schweigert | 10,670 | 4.05% |
| Total votes | | 263,328 | 100.00% |
