= 2010 Honolulu mayoral special election =

- September 18, 2010
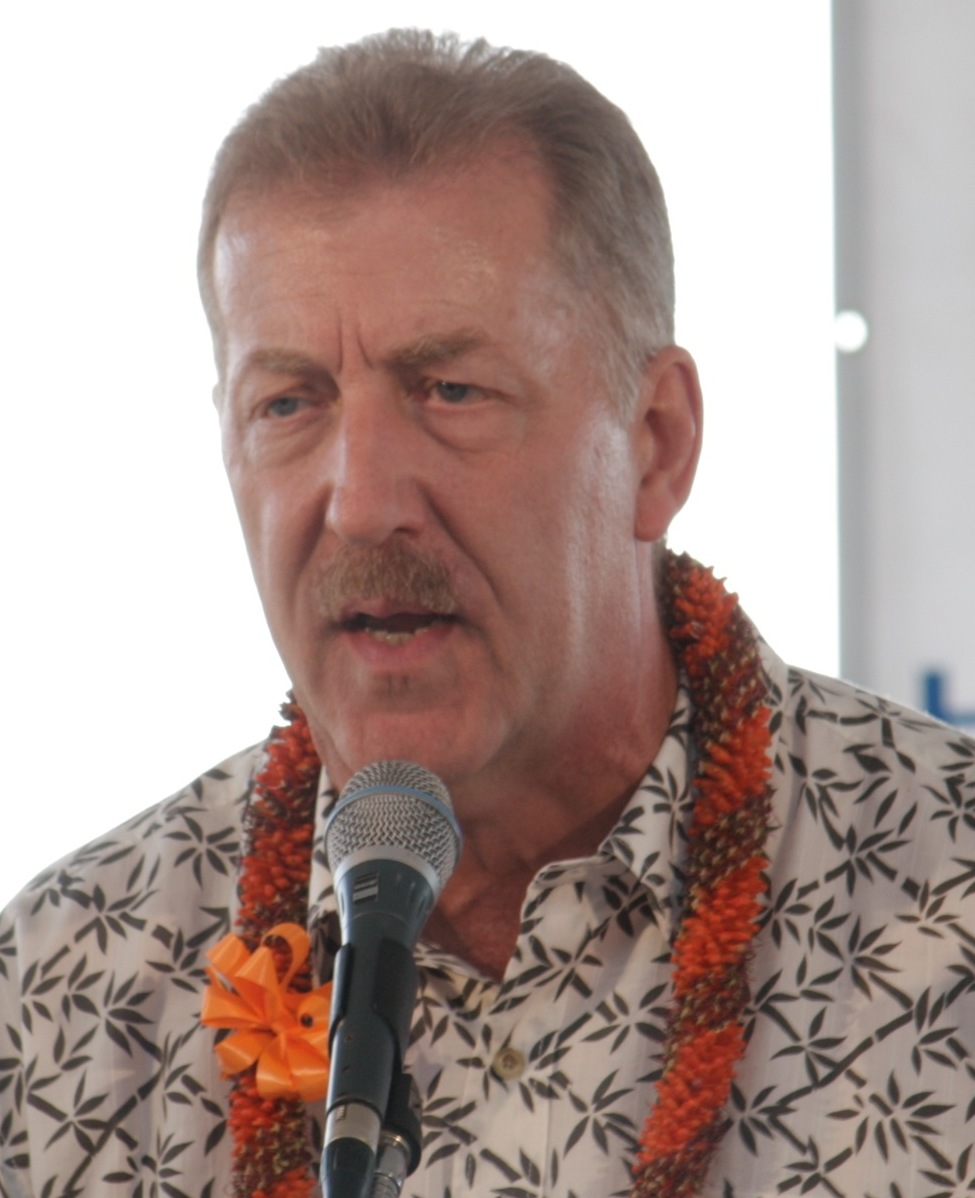

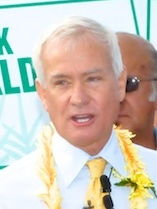

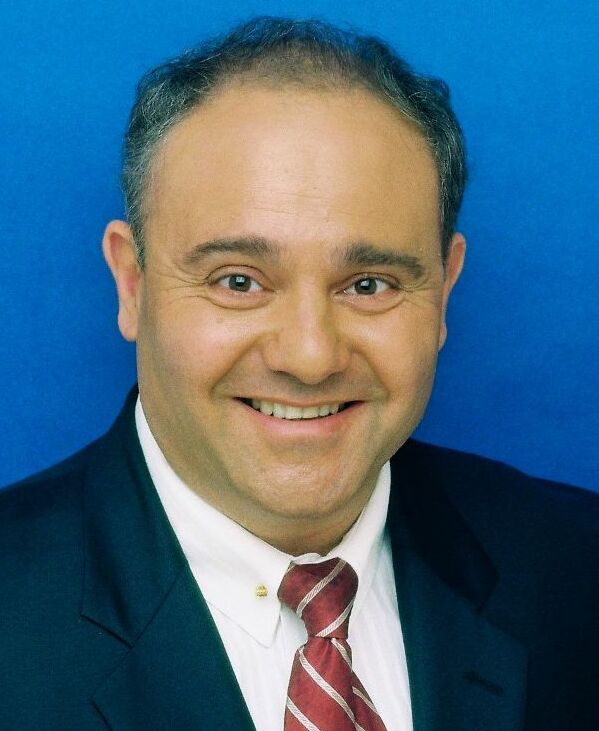
Nominee	Peter Carlisle	Kirk Caldwell	Panos Prevedouros
Popular vote	80,553	71,815	38,439
Percentage	38.8%	34.6%	18.5%
Mayor before election
Mufi Hannemann
Democratic
Elected mayor
Peter Carlisle
Independent

The 2010 Honolulu special mayoral election was held on September 18, 2010. The election coincided with Hawaii's primary election. The winner of the election, Peter Carlisle, filled the unexpired term of former Democratic Honolulu Mayor Mufi Hannemann, who resigned on July 20, 2010, to run in the 2010 election for Governor of Hawaii.

Honolulu Managing Director Kirk Caldwell was acting Mayor of Honolulu on July 20, 2010, following Hannemann's resignation, until the special election was held.

== Special election background ==
Mayor Mufi Hannemann was re-elected to a second term in the 2008 mayoral election. In 2010, he announced his intention seek the Democratic nomination for Governor of Hawaii in the gubernatorial election. Under Hawaii's resign-to-run law, Hannemann had to resign as Mayor of Honolulu in order to pursue election to another office in the state.

Mayor Hannemann resigned from office on July 20, 2010, and formally became a candidate for Governor of Hawaii. Hanneman's resignation necessitated a special mayoral election to fill the remainder of the mayor's unexpired term.

The Honolulu City Council set the date for the mayoral election for September 18, 2010.

== Candidates ==
- Kirk Caldwell, acting Mayor of Honolulu
- Peter Carlisle, Honolulu city prosecutor and lawyer
- Panos D. Prevedouros, University of Hawaii engineering professor
- Rod Tam, Honolulu city councilman

=== Withdrawn ===
- Donovan Dela Cruz, Honolulu city councilman

=== Polls ===
An August 2010 poll conducted by Hawaii News Now and the Star-Advertiser showed Peter Carlisle at 49 percent, Kirk Caldwell with 25 percent, Panos Prevedouros with 11 percent, and Rod Tam being favored by 4 percent of potential voters. Carlisle won the election.

== Results ==
Honolulu mayoral special election, 2010
Candidate	Votes	%
Peter Carlisle	80,553	38.8
Kirk Caldwell	71,815	34.6
Panos Prevedouros	38,439	18.5
Rod Tam	3,036	1.5
Khistina De Jean	761	0.4
Philmund Lee	642	0.3
Calvin Griffin	582	0.3
John Andrew McLeod	391	0.2
Blank votes/over votes	11,218	5.5
Total votes		100.0
