= 2016 Honolulu mayoral election =

- August 13, 2016 (primary); November 8, 2016 (runoff)
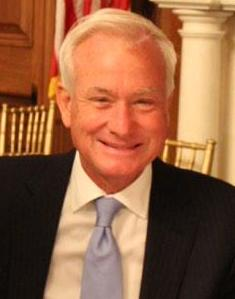

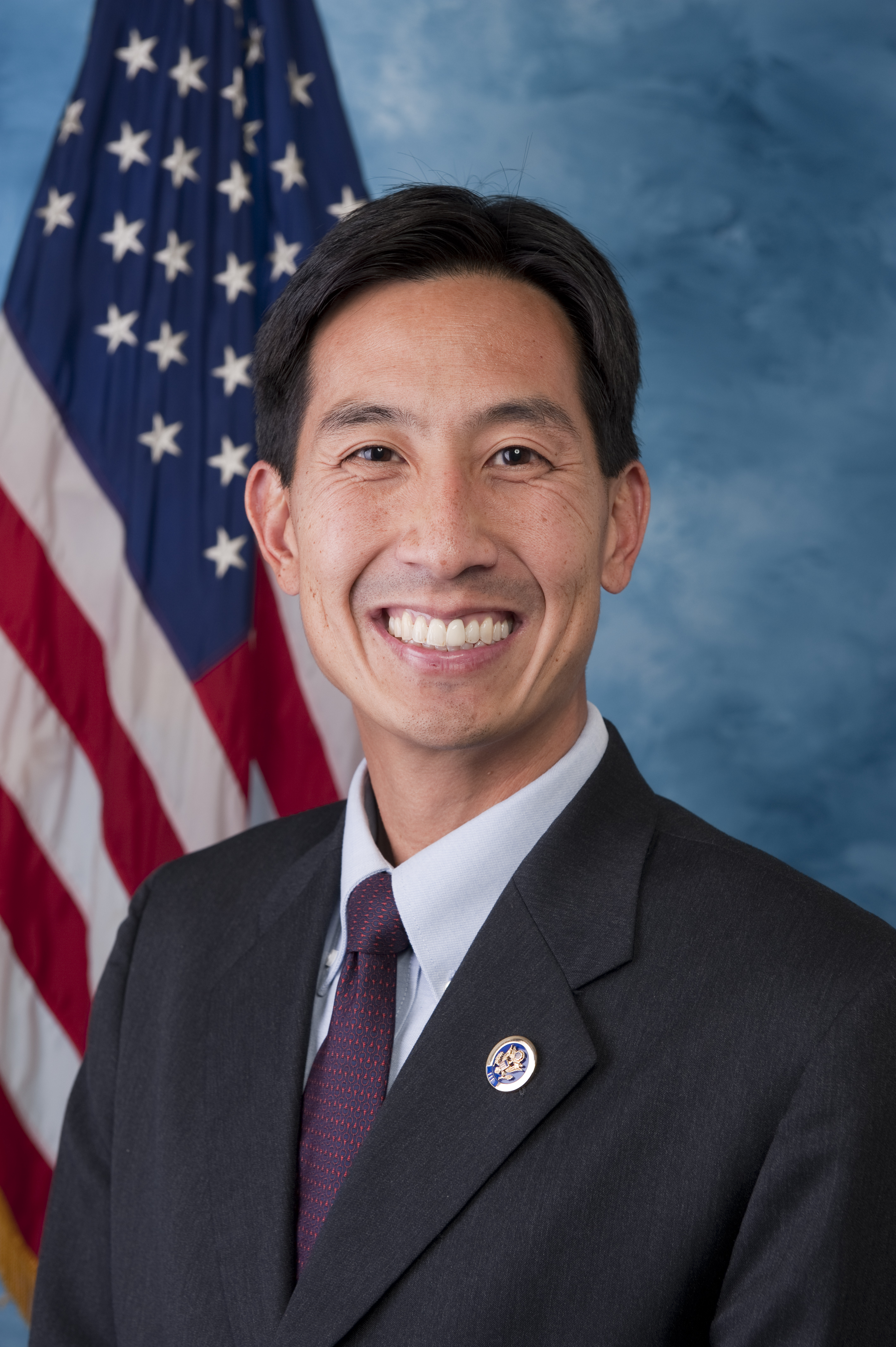

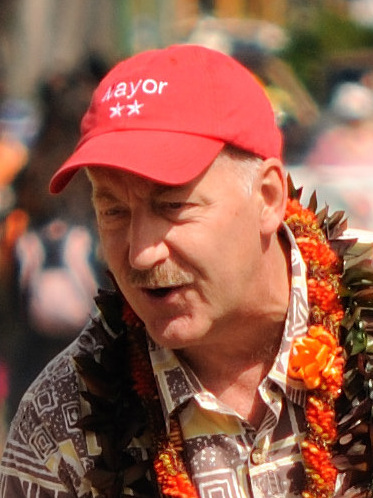
Nominee	Kirk Caldwell	Charles Djou	Peter Carlisle
First round	74,057; 43.7%	72,520; 42.8%	15,539; 9.2%
Runoff	147,885; 52.2%	135,662; 47.8%	Eliminated
- Caldwell: 40–50% 50–60% 60–70% 70–80% Djou: 50–60% 40–50% 50–60% 60–70% No votes
Mayor before election
Kirk Caldwell
Democratic
Elected mayor
Kirk Caldwell
Democratic

The 2016 Honolulu mayoral election determined the Mayor of the City and County of Honolulu for the full term commencing in January 2017. As in the previous several elections, Skyline and its cost overruns was a major topic of the campaign.

Incumbent Democratic Mayor Kirk Caldwell ran for re-election to a second term. A non-partisan blanket primary was held on Saturday, August 13, 2016. As no candidate received an outright majority of the vote in the primary, the top-two finishers, Caldwell and former Republican U.S. Representative Charles Djou, advanced to the general election runoff on Tuesday, November 8, 2016; Caldwell won with 52 percent of the vote, to Djou's 48 percent.

== Candidates ==
- Kirk Caldwell, incumbent Mayor of Honolulu (voter registration: Democratic)
- Charles Djou, former U.S. Representative and former Honolulu City Councilman (voter registration: Republican)

=== Eliminated ===
- Kurt Baker
- Zachary Burd
- Ernest Caravalho
- Peter Carlisle, former Mayor of Honolulu (voter registration: Independent)
- Lawrence Friedman
- Tim Garry
- Ronald Hochuli
- Lillian Hong
- Angela Kaaihue (ran instead for, and received the Republican nomination as, U.S. Representative for Hawaii's 2nd congressional district)
- Mike Powers
- Joseph Wargo

== Endorsements ==
Kirk Caldwell

Politicians

- George Ariyoshi, former Governor and Lt. Governor
- David Ige, Hawaii Governor

Unions

- Hawaii Construction Alliance
- Hawaii Government Employees Association
- International Longshore and Warehouse Union Hawaii Longshore Division
- State of Hawaii Organization of Police Officers (SHOPO)
Charles Djou

Politicians

- Duke Aiona, former Lt. Governor
- Ben Cayetano, former Governor and Lt. Governor
- Walter Meheula Heen, Judge and former Chair of the Democratic Party of Hawaii
- Ann Kobayashi, Honolulu City Council member and former Hawaii State Senator

Unions

- International Association of Heat and Frost Insulators and Allied Workers, Local 132
- International Brotherhood of Electrical Workers, Local 1186
- International Brotherhood of Electrical Workers, Local 1260
- International Union of Elevator Constructors, Local 126
- Plumbers and Fitters Union, Local 675

== Primary ==
=== Polling ===
Poll source	Date(s) administered	Sample size	Margin of error	Kirk Caldwell	Peter Carlisle	Charles Djou	Undecided
Hawaii News Now – Star-Advertiser	June–July, 2016	401	± 4.9%	30%	15%	39%	9%

=== Primary results ===
Honolulu mayoral primary election, August 13, 2016
Candidate	Votes	%
Kirk Caldwell (incumbent)	74,057	43.7%
Charles Djou	72,520	42.8%
Peter Carlisle	15,539	9.2%
Blank Votes	3,440	2.0%
Lillian Lai Wam Wang Hong	1,140	0.7%
Ernest Caravalho	781	0.5%
Ronald E. Hochuli	635	0.4%
Kurt Baker	360	0.2%
Lawrence Friedman	346	0.2%
Mike Powers	317	0.2%
Tim Garry	210	0.1%
Zachary B. Burd	97	0.1%
Over votes	72	0.0%
Total votes	169,514	100%

== General election ==
=== Results ===
Caldwell won reelection on November 8, 2016, in the runoff with Djou, 52.2% to 47.8%. Though both candidates supported the municipal rail project, substantial cost overruns were an issue, as was Caldwell's alleged interference with the Ethics Commission.
