= 2012 Honolulu mayoral election =

- August 11, 2012 (first round); November 6, 2012 (runoff)
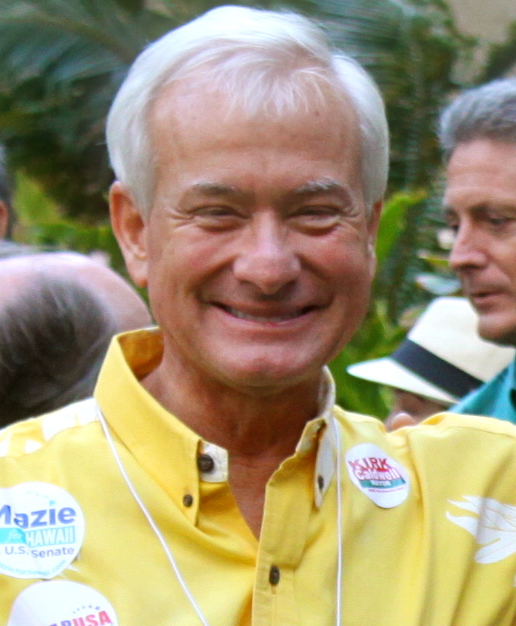

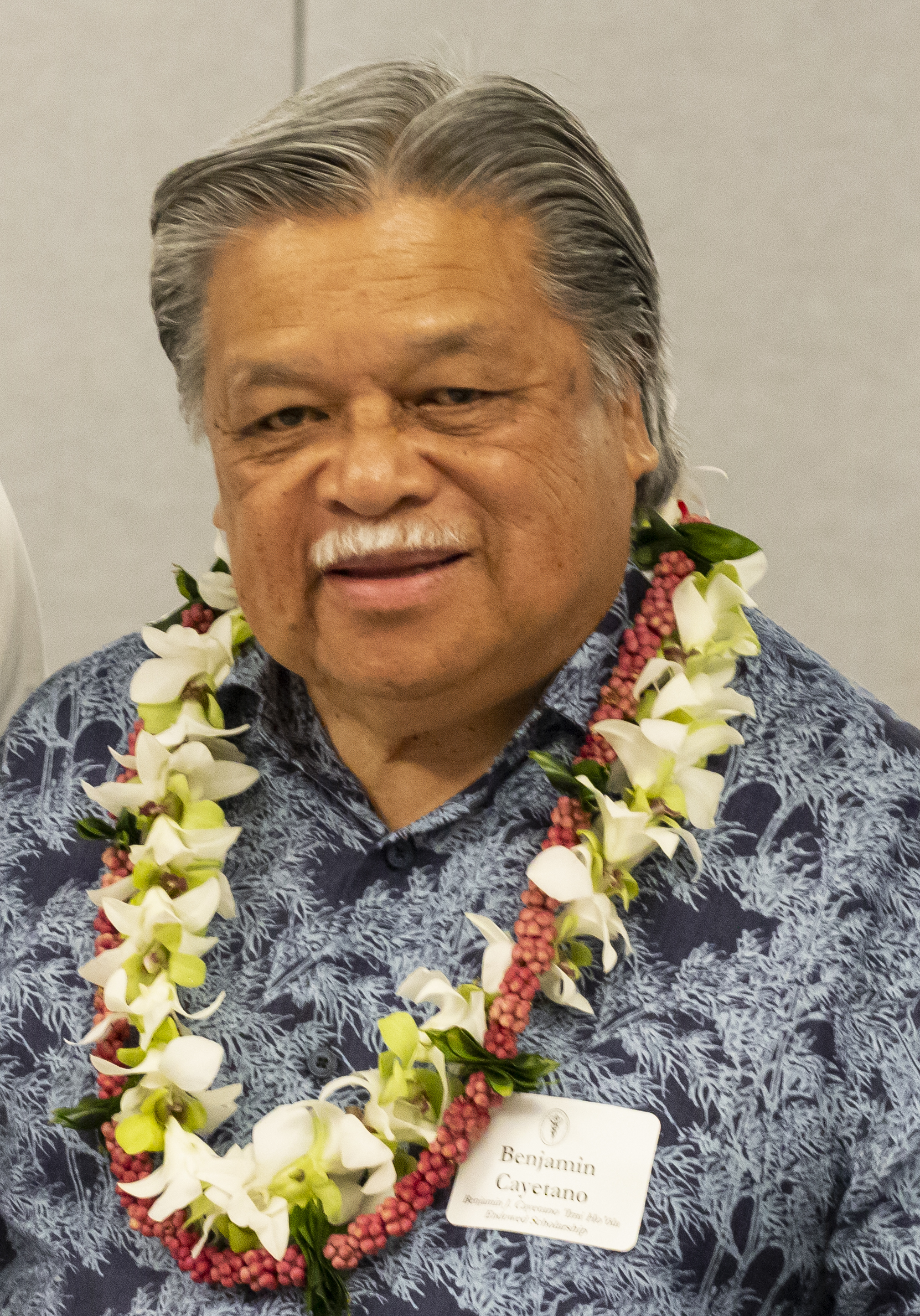

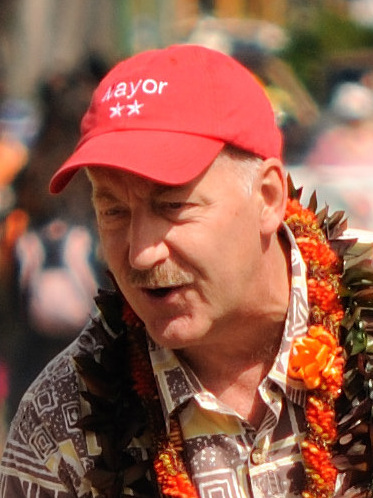
Nominee	Kirk Caldwell	Ben Cayetano	Peter Carlisle
First round	59,963; 29.1%	90,956; 44.1%	51,101; 24.8%
Runoff	157,714; 52.9%	134,740; 45.2%	Eliminated
- Caldwell: 30–40% 40–50% 50–60% 60–70% 70–80% Cayetano: 30–40% 40–50% 50–60% 60–70% 70–80% Carlisle: 30–40% 50–60% 60–70% Tie: 50% No votes
Mayor before election
Peter Carlisle
Independent
Elected mayor
Kirk Caldwell
Democratic

The 2012 Honolulu mayoral election was held on Tuesday, November 6, 2012, to elect the Mayor of the City and County of Honolulu. Kirk Caldwell was elected mayor, beating opponent and former Hawaii governor Ben Cayetano.

The position of Mayor of Honolulu is non-partisan. A non-partisan blanket primary was held on August 11, 2012. Because no candidate received an outright majority of the vote in the primary, the top two finishers, Ben Cayetano and Kirk Caldwell, advanced to the November general election runoff. Incumbent Independent mayor Peter Carlisle was seeking a first full term in office but finished third in the primary and did not proceed to the runoff election.

== Candidates ==
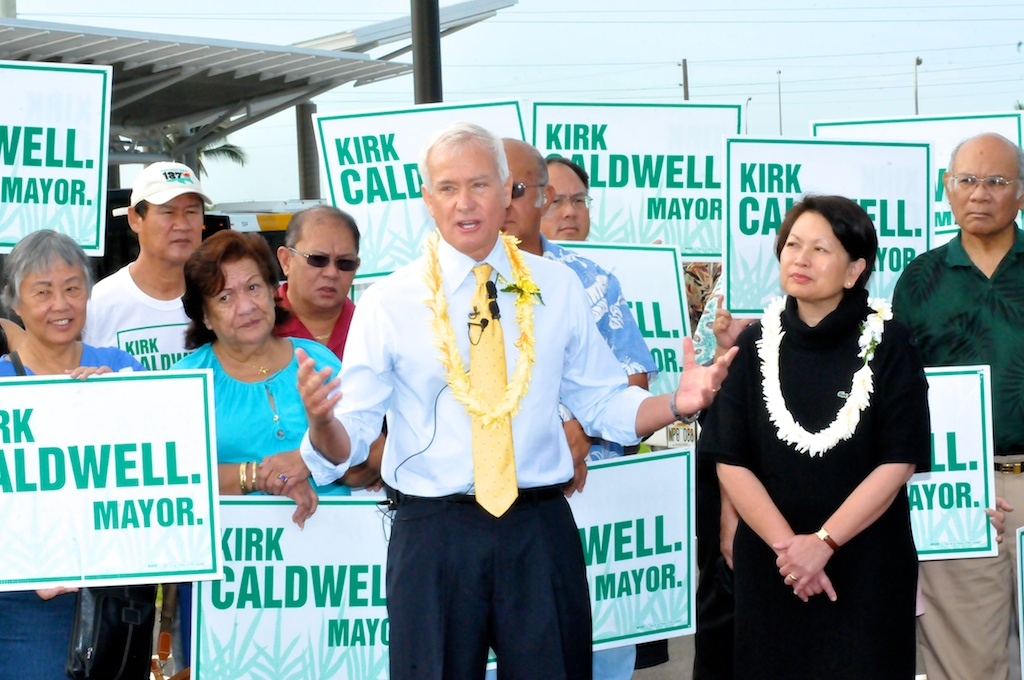
Kirk Caldwell announces his second run for mayor, January 2012.

- Kirk Caldwell, former Acting Mayor of Honolulu and managing director of Honolulu
- Ben Cayetano, former Governor of Hawaii

=== Eliminated ===
- Peter Carlisle, incumbent Mayor
- Khistina Caldwell Dejean, candidate for mayor in 2010

== Primary ==
=== Polling ===
Poll source	Date(s) administered	Sample size	Margin of error	Kirk Caldwell	Peter Carlisle	Ben Cayetano	Undecided
Merriman River/Civil Beat	July 31–August 2, 2012	1,098	± 3.0%	24%	19%	51%	4%
Merriman River/Civil Beat	June 5–7, 2012	799	± 3.5%	23%	21%	44%	12%
Merriman River/Civil Beat	February 26–27, 2012	1,172	± 2.9%	16%	21%	53%	9%

=== Results ===
Honolulu mayoral primary election, 2012
Candidate	Votes	%
Ben Cayetano	90,956	44.1
Kirk Caldwell	59,963	29.1
Peter Carlisle (incumbent)	51,101	24.8
Blank Votes	2,678	1.3
Khistina Caldwell Dejean	1,289	0.6
Over Votes	47	0.0
Total votes	206,034	100

== General election ==
=== Polling ===
Poll source	Date(s) administered	Sample size	Margin of error	Kirk Caldwell	Ben Cayetano	Undecided
Civil Beat	October 24–26, 2012	886	± 3.3%	45%	50%	5%
Hawaii News Now – Star Advertiser	October 15–22, 2012	552	± 4.2%	53%	42%	5%
Civil Beat	September 26–28, 2012	1,257	± 2.8%	42%	51%	7%
Pacific Resource Partnership	August 16–20, 2012	700	± 3.7%	47%	45%	8%

=== Results ===
Results, Honolulu mayoral general election, November 6, 2012
Candidate	Votes	%
Kirk Caldwell	157,714	52.9
Ben Cayetano	134,740	45.2
Blank votes	5,827	2.0
Over votes	58	0.0
Total votes	298,339	100

==== By district ====
District	Neighborhood	Caldwell	Cayetano
17	Hawaii Kai	49.7%	50.3%
18	Kuliouou Niu	46.7	53.3
19	Waialae Kahala	48.2	51.8
20	Wilhelmina	52	48
21	Kapiolani	54.3	45.7
22	Waikiki	52.7	47.3
23	Manoa UH	56.2	43.8
24	Makiki Pawaa	52.2	47.8
25	Punchbowl	52.5	47.5
26	Downtown	53.8	46.2
27	Alewa Hghts	51.1	48.9
28	Kapalama	42.6	57.4
29	Iwilei	48.4	51.6
30	HNL	41.8	58.2
31	Shafter	55.9	44.1
32	Tripler	56.4	43.6
33	Aiea R. Summit	62.7	37.3
34	Pacific Palsds	61.8	38.2
35	Pearl Waipio	59.2	40.8
36	Mili Mauka	63.2	36.7
37	Waikele	62	38
38	Waipahu	48.7	51.3
39	Kunia/Park	60	40
40	Iroquois	57.1	42.9
41	Ewa Villages	59.6	40.4
42	Kap/Makakilo	65.1	34.9
43	Ko Olina	57.2	42.8
44	Waianae	51.9	48.1
45	Schofield	55.8	44.2
46	Wahiawa	55.9	44.1
47	Haleiwa	49.7	50.3
48	Ahuimanu	50	50
49	Aikahi	52.2	47.8
50	KMCBH	45.5	54.5
51	Enchanted Lks	49.1	50.9
