= 2008 Honolulu mayoral election =

- September 20, 2008 (first round); November 4, 2008 (runoff)
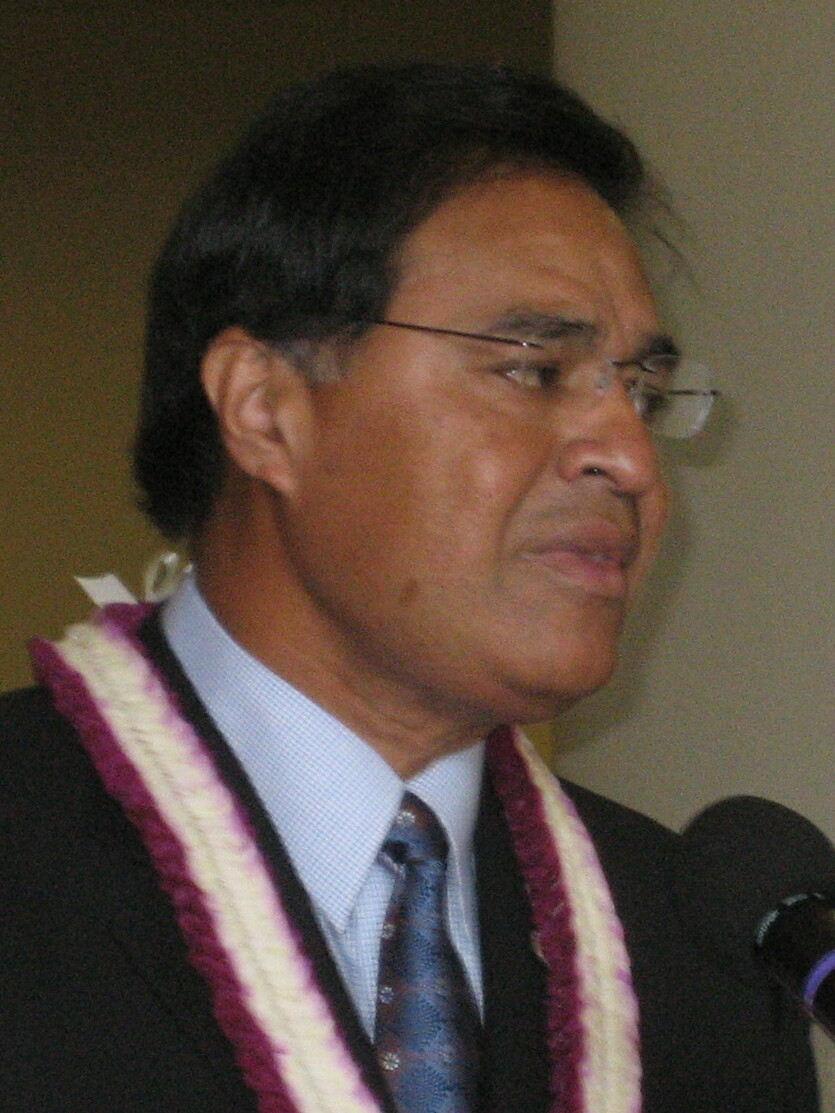

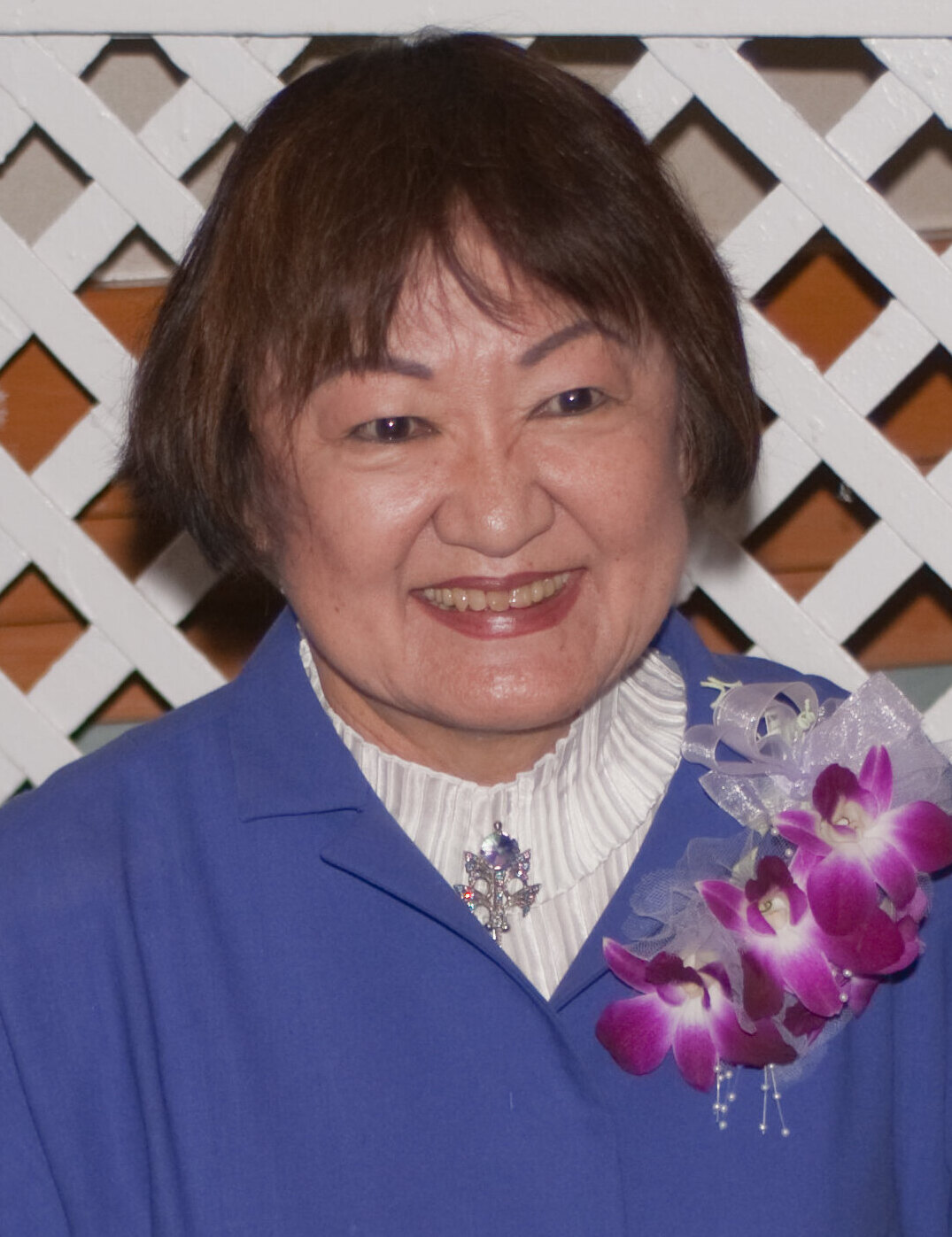

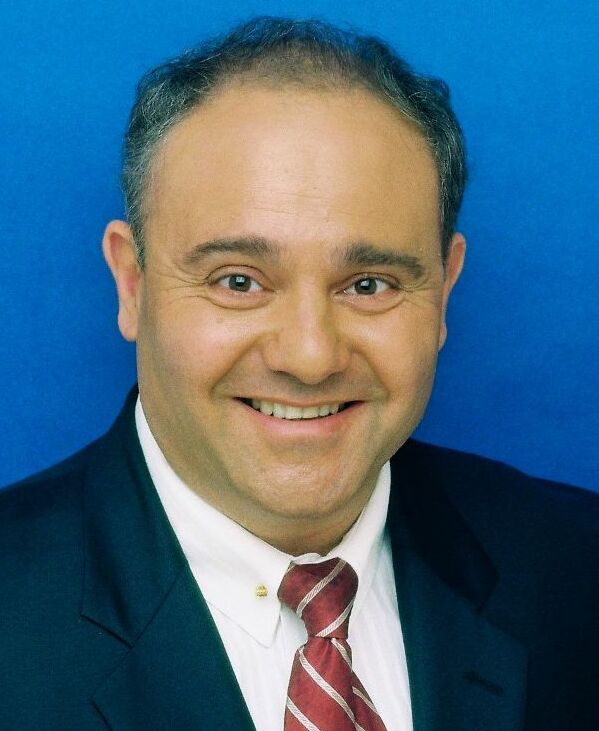
Candidate	Mufi Hannemann	Ann Kobayashi	Panos Prevedouros
First round	80,260; 49.39%	49,020; 30.17%	28,782; 17.71%
Runoff	172,798; 57.90%	125,626; 42.10%	Eliminated
Mayor before election
Mufi Hannemann
Democratic
Elected mayor
Mufi Hannemann
Democratic

The 2008 Honolulu mayoral election was held between September 20 and November 4, 2008, in order to elect the Mayor of Honolulu. Incumbent Mayor Mufi Hannemann was re-elected after a run-off against Ann Kobayashi.

== General Election ==
Since no candidate had received 50% of the vote in the first round on September 20, 2008, a runoff was held between the top-two finishers on November 4, 2008.

== Results ==
=== First round ===
Results
Candidate	Votes	%
Mufi Hannemann (incumbent)	80,260	49.39
Ann Kobayashi	49,020	30.17
Panos Prevedouros	28,782	17.71
Jacqueline R. Maly	1,541	0.95
George Nitta Jr.	1,398	0.86
Daniel H. Cunningham	737	0.45
Cameron M. Datanagan	341	0.21
Paul A. Manner	223	0.14
Donavon D. Kambel	197	0.12
Total votes	162,499	100.00

=== Runoff ===
Results
Candidate	Votes	%
Mufi Hannemann (incumbent)	172,798	57.90
Ann Kobayashi	125,626	42.10
Total votes	298,424	100.00
