= Panos Prevedouros =

Panos D. Prevedouros
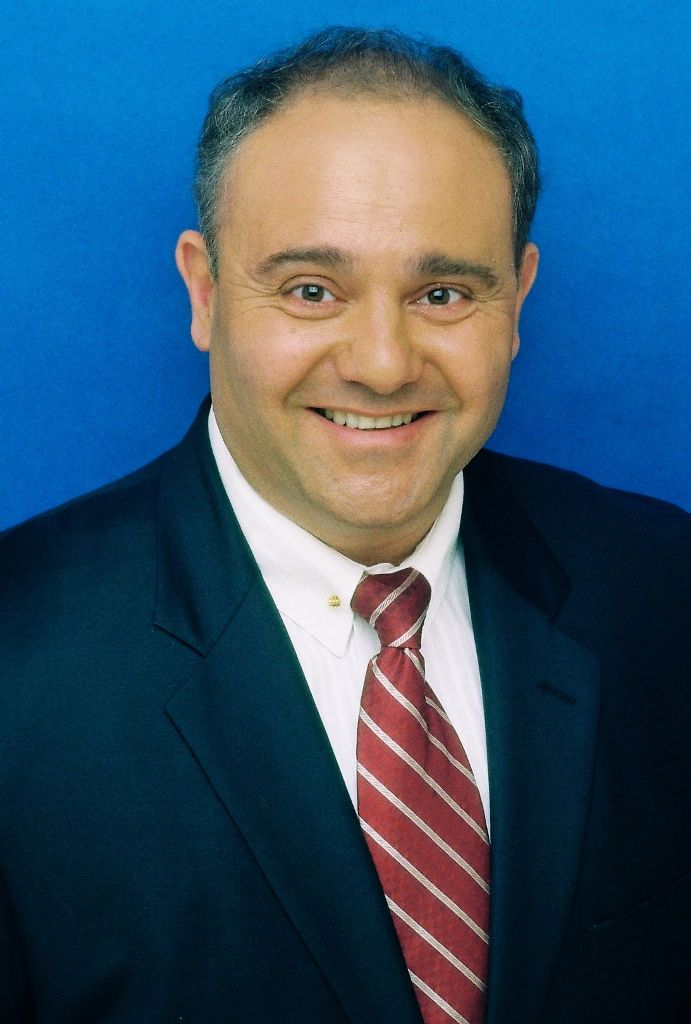
- Prevedouros in 2008
- Born: October 2, 1961 (age 65); Patras, Greece
- Education: Northwestern University (Ph.D., 1990; A.B., 1987)
- Occupations: Professor of Traffic and Transportation Engineering

Panos D. Prevedouros (born October 2, 1961), is Professor of Civil Engineering at the University of Hawaii at Manoa, subcommittee chair of the Transportation Research Board (a unit of the National Academy of Engineering), co-author of the textbook Transportation Engineering and Planning, published by Prentice Hall in 1993 and 2001. He was a two-time unsuccessful candidate for Mayor of the City and County of Honolulu, running on a program of absolute opposition to mass transit.

== Life ==
Prevedouros was born in Patras, Greece, on October 2, 1961, and obtained an Engineering Diploma (5-year program) in Land Surveying from Aristotle University of Thessaloniki, Greece in 1985. He earned Masters and Doctorate degrees in Civil Engineering (in 1987 and 1990, respectively) from Northwestern University’s McCormick School of Engineering and its Transportation Center in Evanston, Illinois. He moved to Hawaii in July 1990 as Assistant Professor with the Department of Civil Engineering at the University of Hawaii at Manoa, and became Full Professor in 2004. He was Graduate Program Chair in the Department of Civil and Environmental Engineering from 1998 to 2003.

== Academic career ==
Prevedouros is the author of numerous technical reports and scholarly journal articles. He publishes his opinions on infrastructure, energy, sustainability, and policy issues on a blog called "Fix Oahu!".

He is a Registered Professional Engineer in the European Union, and a court-qualified traffic and transportation engineering expert in the State of Hawaii. His professional expertise is in urban road network management, including freeway and corridor management, incident management, traffic flow analysis and simulation, traffic signal optimization, traffic sensors and intelligent transportation systems, demand forecasting, evaluation of transportation alternatives, sustainable infrastructure and transportation systems, policies, and regulations.

Prevedouros assisted both Hawaii Department of Transportation and Attica Tollway (Attiki Odos) in constructing to lessen the impact of bottlenecks, such as the Lunalilo on-ramp management, the Liliha-Pali couplet of ramps, the planned Middle Street improvements, and PM zipper lane deployments on Oahu; and the rerouting of the Peripheral Freeway connector onto Attica Tollway as well as a new interchange between Attica Tollway and Greek National Road 1 in Athens.

Prevedouros received the Best Paper Award on Transportation Noise, Transportation Research Board of the National Academy of Sciences in 1995, the Outstanding Faculty Award from the American Society of Civil Engineers–Hawaii in 1996, the Van Wagoner Award for Urban Underpasses from the Institute of Transportation Engineers in 2005, and the Freeway Operations Service Award from the Transportation Research Board of the National Academies in 2009.

Prevedouros is Chair of the Subcommittee on Freeway Simulation, Transportation Research Board, National Academies since 2005. He was co‑chair of the 1st International Symposium of Freeway and Tollway Operations in Athens, Greece, from June 4 to 7, 2006. He also served as chair of the 2nd International Symposium of Freeway and Tollway Operations in Honolulu, Hawaii, from June 21 to 24, 2009.

== Political career ==
Prevedouros was candidate for Mayor of the City and County of Honolulu in the primary election in September 2008, against incumbent mayor Mufi Hannemann and City Council member Ann Kobayashi. He received 17.2% of the vote. In spring 2010 mayor Hannemann resigned to run for governor and lost in the Democratic primary election to U.S. Congressman Neil Abercrombie who was elected governor in November 2010. Prevedouros was one of four main candidates in the special election for mayor for the remaining two years of the term. He ran against veteran city prosecutor Peter Carlisle (who won the race with 39% of the vote), city manager and acting mayor Kirk Caldwell, and term-limited council member Rod Tam. Prevedouros came third after receiving 18.5% of the votes in the 2010 primary election. Prevedouros gained nearly 10,000 votes over his 28,792 in 2008, to 38,408 in 2010, but only increased his percentage of the vote by 1.3%. In both elections, his program was centered on resolute opposition to public transportation.

Prevedouros served on the Technical Advisory Committee of Oahu Metropolitan Planning Organization from 2003 to 2004, was a member of the Transit Advisory Task Force for the Honolulu High-Capacity Transit Corridor Project in 2006, and was the Council Chair's appointee on the expert panel for the selection of fixed guideway technology for Honolulu in 2008. From 2006 to 2008 he was President of the Hawaii Highway Users Alliance. He was named one of the "50 People Who Rocked Hawaii" by the Hawaii Reporter in 2003, one of "Ten People Who Made a Difference in Hawaii" in 2008 by the Honolulu Star-Bulletin, and one of Hawaii’s seven "superheroes" by the Hawaii Reporter in 2009.
