= Gary Gill (politician) =

American politician

Chair of the Honolulu City Council
- In office October 12, 1992 – July 18, 1994
- Preceded by: Arnold Morgado
- Succeeded by: John DeSoto

Member of the Honolulu City Council from the 6th district
- In office 1987 – July 29, 1994
- Preceded by: Tony Narvaes
- Succeeded by: Audrey Hidano

Personal details
- Born: 1959 or 1960 (age 66–67)
- Party: Democratic

Gary Gill is a former politician from Honolulu, Hawaii. He was a member of the Honolulu City Council between 1987 and 1994, representing Downtown Honolulu's District 6. Gill served as Chair of the Council from October 12, 1992 until July 18, 1994, when he resigned from council to run for Mayor of Honolulu, losing to incumbent mayor Jeremy Harris.

== Career ==
In 2013, Gill was named interim director of the Hawaii Department of Health after the unexpected passing of director Loretta Fuddy. He had previously served as deputy health director for the environment.

Outside of government, Gill has worked as development director for the Hawaii Sierra Club, program manager for Kokua Kalihi Valley community health clinic, executive director of Waimea Valley on Oahu's North Shore, and program director for Blue Planet Foundation of Hawaii.

== Personal life ==
Gill is the son of former Hawaii congressman and lieutenant governor Thomas Gill and nephew of Lorin Tarr Gill, founder of the Hawaii Chapter of the Sierra Club.
