= Pacific Resource Partnership =

- Formation: 1987
- Headquarters: Honolulu, Hawaii, U.S.
- Executive director: Nathaniel "Nat" Kinney
- Website: prp-hawaii.com

Pacific Resource Partnership (PRP) is a 501(c)(5) non-profit market recovery organization based in Honolulu, Hawaiʻi. Established as a joint venture between the Hawaii Regional Council of Carpenters (affiliated with the United Brotherhood of Carpenters and Joiners of America) and over 250 signatory contractors, PRP functions as an intermediary that represents both labor and management in the construction industry. The organization is widely recognized as one of the most influential political and advocacy entities in the State of Hawaiʻi.

== Mission and industry advocacy ==
PRP's stated mission is to promote the unionized construction industry through research, marketing, and legislative advocacy. PRP is a steadfast proponent of large-scale public works projects, most notably the Honolulu Rail Transit (Skyline) project, which it views as a critical economic driver. The organization advocates for the enforcement of prevailing wage laws and the use of Project Labor Agreements (PLAs) to ensure high labor standards and safety on job sites. PRP frequently participates in policy discussions and provides testimony on state and county measures aimed at increasing the supply of workforce and affordable housing.

== Governance and community impact ==
PRP is governed by a Board of Trustees representing both the Hawaii Regional Council of Carpenters and signatory contractors. Beyond politics, the organization participates in community initiatives and philanthropic efforts, including disaster relief contributions and supporting local non-profits focused on education and social services.

== Political influence and PAC activity ==
PRP exerts significant political influence through various financial vehicles, including the Hawaii Carpenters Market Recovery Program Fund and the super PAC "For A Better Tomorrow," formerly known as "Be Change Now." The organization is known for its data-driven campaign strategies, utilizing extensive polling and statistical modeling to support "pro-growth" candidates, including Honolulu Mayor Kirk Caldwell. PRP typically backs pro-rail candidates and others involved in the construction industry. When the super PAC was formed in 2018, they had over $45 million in cash.

=== Notable Political Affiliations ===
PRP maintains a significant presence in Hawaiʻi’s political landscape, not only through its campaign spending but also through the direct transition of its leadership into high-level government roles. Several key political figures and public officials have direct professional ties to PRP or its founding union, the Hawaii Regional Council of Carpenters.

- Mike Formby: Formby served as PRP's Executive Director from June 2019 to July 2020. His career includes a broad range of public service roles, including serving as an interim member of the Honolulu City Council (2019), the Director of the Honolulu Department of Transportation Services (2013–2016), and the Chief of Staff to U.S. Representative Colleen Hanabusa. In 2020, he was selected to serve as managing director to Honolulu Mayor Rick Blangiardi.
- Brooke Wilson: Wilson is currently the Chief of Staff to Governor Josh Green, a role she has held since his inauguration in December 2022. Before joining Green’s administration, she was the Political and Education Director for the Hawaii Regional Council of Carpenters. Her appointment drew media attention due to the significant support Green’s primary campaign received from the Carpenters-backed super PAC, Be Change Now.
- Kyle Chock: A central figure in PRP’s history, Chock served as the organization's Executive Director from 2005 to 2011, where he led the advocacy programs supporting the Honolulu Rail Transit project. He concurrently served on the Hawaii State Land Use Commission, which determines land use classifications that are key to community planning and development.
- Andy Winer: A prominent political strategist, lawyer, and lobbyist in Hawaiʻi who has a long-standing professional relationship with PRP, Winer is often described as one of the state's most effective political operatives, known for his deep ties to both the local and federal branches of the Democratic Party. He managed Barack Obama's 2008 presidential campaign in Hawaiʻi and led successful Senate campaigns for both Brian Schatz (2014, 2016) and Mazie Hirono (2012). He served as the Chief of Staff for U.S. Senator Brian Schatz for six years (2013–2019), overseeing the Senator's appropriations and legislative strategy in Washington, D.C. Winer also played a lead role as a senior consultant to Governor Josh Green’s gubernatorial campaign. Following the election, he continued to serve in a leadership capacity within Green’s team.
- John White: Previously served as the Executive Director of PRP, overseeing its advocacy efforts during various legislative cycles and major construction initiatives in Honolulu. A former Executive Director of PRP who oversaw the organization's multi-million dollar independent expenditure campaign for Honolulu Mayor Kirk Caldwell. He is a veteran strategist who previously served as Chief of Staff to then-Congresswoman Mazie Hirono before moving into private lobbying alongside Andy Winer in December 2025.
- Bruce Coppa: The original Executive Director of PRP. He later served in two high-level state positions: Comptroller of Hawaii and Chief of Staff to Governor Neil Abercrombie. He is currently a leading lobbyist at Capitol Consultants of Hawaii.

=== Negative campaigning and election controversies ===
PRP has a documented history of utilizing aggressive independent expenditures and negative advertising against candidates who oppose major infrastructure projects, particularly the Honolulu rail transit project, or other union priorities:

- In 2012, PRP spent over $3 million to oppose former Governor Ben Cayetano's 2012 bid for Mayor of Honolulu due to his anti-rail platform. Following the election, Cayetano filed a defamation lawsuit against PRP for ads he alleged falsely accused him of illegal acts, which were later discredited. The suit was settled in 2014 with PRP issuing a public apology and donating $100,000 to charities. The 2012 tactics deployed by PRP’s super PAC led to fines by the Campaign Spending Commission, which determined the group failed to report hundreds of thousands of dollars in expenses.
- In 2018, the PAC backed Governor David Ige’s opponent Colleen Hanabusa, and ran ads reminding voters of the time Ige forgot his Twitter password during the false missile alert crisis in early 2018.
- In the 2018 Lieutenant Governor primary, PRP spent more than $1 million helping Senator Josh Green defeat Senator Jill Tokuda for lieutenant governor due to Tokuda's opposition to rail funding.
- In the 2022 Lieutenant Governor primary, PRP-backed PACs spent over $1.2 million on ads targeting Representative Sylvia Luke, criticizing her leadership as House Finance Chair for refusing to support a permanent extension to the tax surcharge on Oahu residents. They spent over $2.9 million to support her opponent, Ikaika Anderson. Their $4.1 million spending total set a historic state record for spending by a PAC in a single race.
- Other politicians who have been subjects of PRP-funded negative campaigns include Carol Fukunaga for Honolulu City Council in 2018 and Ann Kobayashi for Honolulu City Council in 2012, following disagreements over rail funding or labor-related legislation.
