= 1964 United States Senate election in Hawaii =

- November 3, 1964
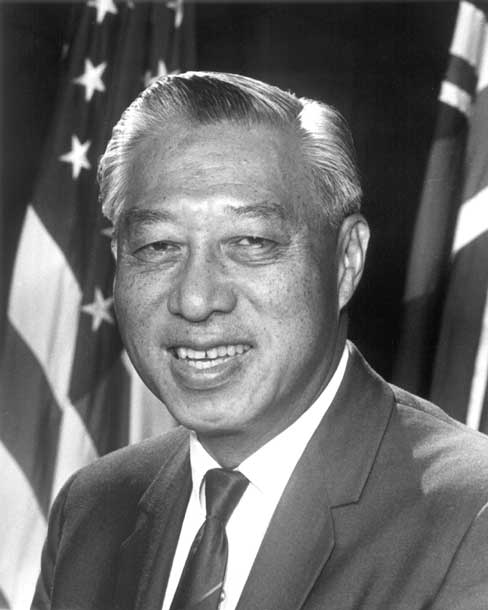

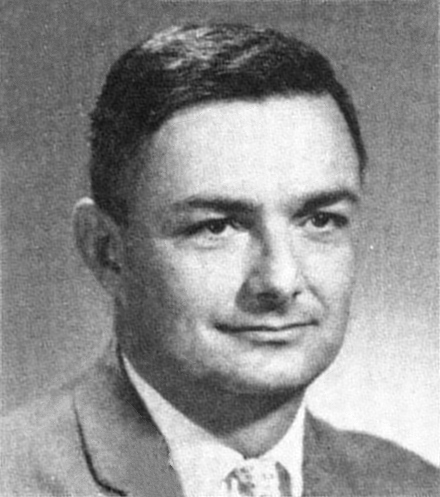
Nominee	Hiram Fong	Thomas Gill
Party	Republican	Democratic
Popular vote	110,747	96,789
Percentage	53.04%	46.35%
- County results Fong: 50–60% Gill: 40–50%
U.S. senator before election
Hiram Fong
Republican
Elected U.S. Senator
Hiram Fong
Republican

The 1964 United States Senate election in Hawaii took place on November 3, 1964.

Incumbent Republican U.S Senator Hiram Fong was re-elected to a second term in office, defeating Democratic U.S. Representative Thomas Gill.

== Republican primary ==
=== Candidates ===
- Hiram Fong, incumbent Senator
- Frank Troy, Democratic candidate for Senate in 1962

=== Results ===
Republican Senate primary
Party	Candidate	Votes	%
Republican	Hiram Fong (inc.)	31,770	95.25%
Republican	Frank Troy	1,586	4.75%
Total votes		33,356	100.00%

== Democratic primary ==
=== Candidates ===
- Thomas Gill, U.S. Representative
- Joseph Petrowski
- Nadao Yoshinaga, State Senator from Maui

=== Results ===
Democratic Senate primary
Party	Candidate	Votes	%
Democratic	Thomas Gill	71,298	63.97%
Democratic	Nadao Yoshinaga	37,253	33.42%
Democratic	Joseph Petrowski	2,904	2.61%
Total votes		111,455	100.00%

== General election ==
=== Results ===
1964 United States Senate election in Hawaii
Party	Candidate	Votes	%	±%
Republican	Hiram Fong (incumbent)	110,747	53.04%	▲1.96
Democratic	Thomas Gill	96,789	46.35%	▼1.93
Independent	Lawrence Domine	1,278	0.61%	N/A
Total votes		208,814	100.00%	

== See also ==
- 1964 United States Senate elections
