= Frank Fasi =

American politician (1920–2010)

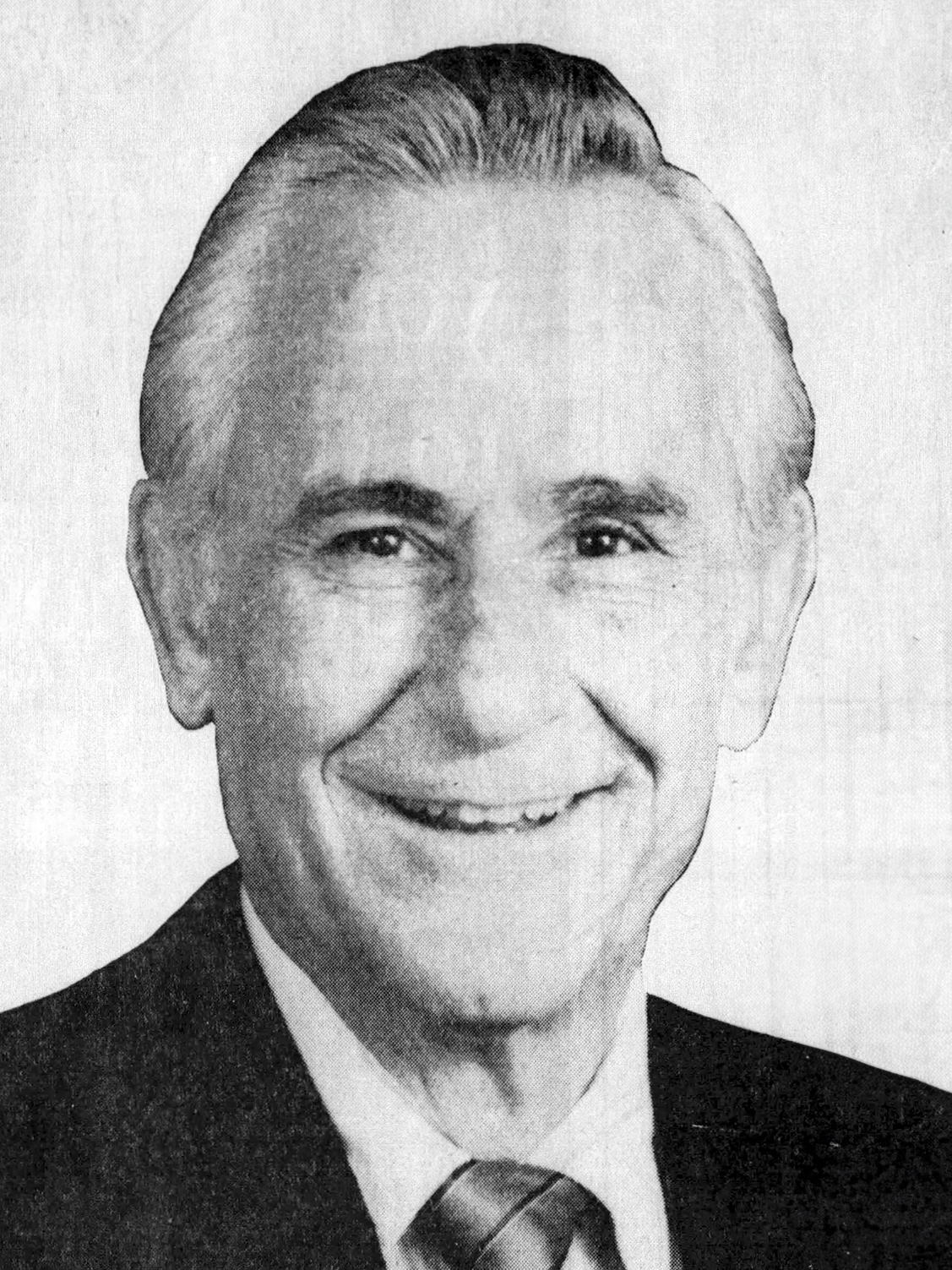

9th Mayor of Honolulu
- In office January 2, 1985 – September 1994
- Preceded by: Eileen Anderson
- Succeeded by: Jeremy Harris
- In office January 2, 1969 – January 2, 1981
- Preceded by: Neal Blaisdell
- Succeeded by: Eileen Anderson

Personal details
- Born: August 27, 1920 East Hartford, Connecticut, U.S.
- Died: February 3, 2010 (aged 89) Honolulu, Hawaii, U.S.
- Party: Democratic (before 1984); Republican (1984–1994); Best Party (1994–1996); Independent (1996–2010)
- Spouse: Florence Ohama (m. 1946–1957) Joyce Miyeku Kono (m. 1958–2010)
- Children: 11
- Education: Trinity College, Connecticut (BA)

Frank Francis Fasi (August 27, 1920 – February 3, 2010) was an American politician who was the longest-serving mayor of Honolulu, Hawaii, serving for 22 years. He also served as a territorial senator and member of the Honolulu City Council. To date, he remains the last Republican mayor of Honolulu.

== Early life ==
Frank Francis Fasi was born on 27 August 1920 in East Hartford, Connecticut, to Sicilian immigrants Carmelo and Josephine Lupo Fasi. Carmelo owned an ice business, and Frank began working for his father at age 11. He finished 7th out of his class of 476 in high school, and graduated from Trinity College where he had been a history major on an academic scholarship.

Fasi tried to join the United States Marine Corps after graduation from Trinity. The Marines turned him down because of his color blindness. On his second try, he hired a friend to take the eye test for him, and he became a Marine. He served in the Pacific Theater of World War II and was briefly stationed on Kauai. He was discharged as a first lieutenant in Boston, Massachusetts, in 1946, and immediately returned to Hawaii. In 1956, he resigned his commission as captain in the Marine Corps Reserve.

Fasi settled in Honolulu, where he became an entrepreneur, opening his own contracting, building demolition and salvage company.

== Political career ==
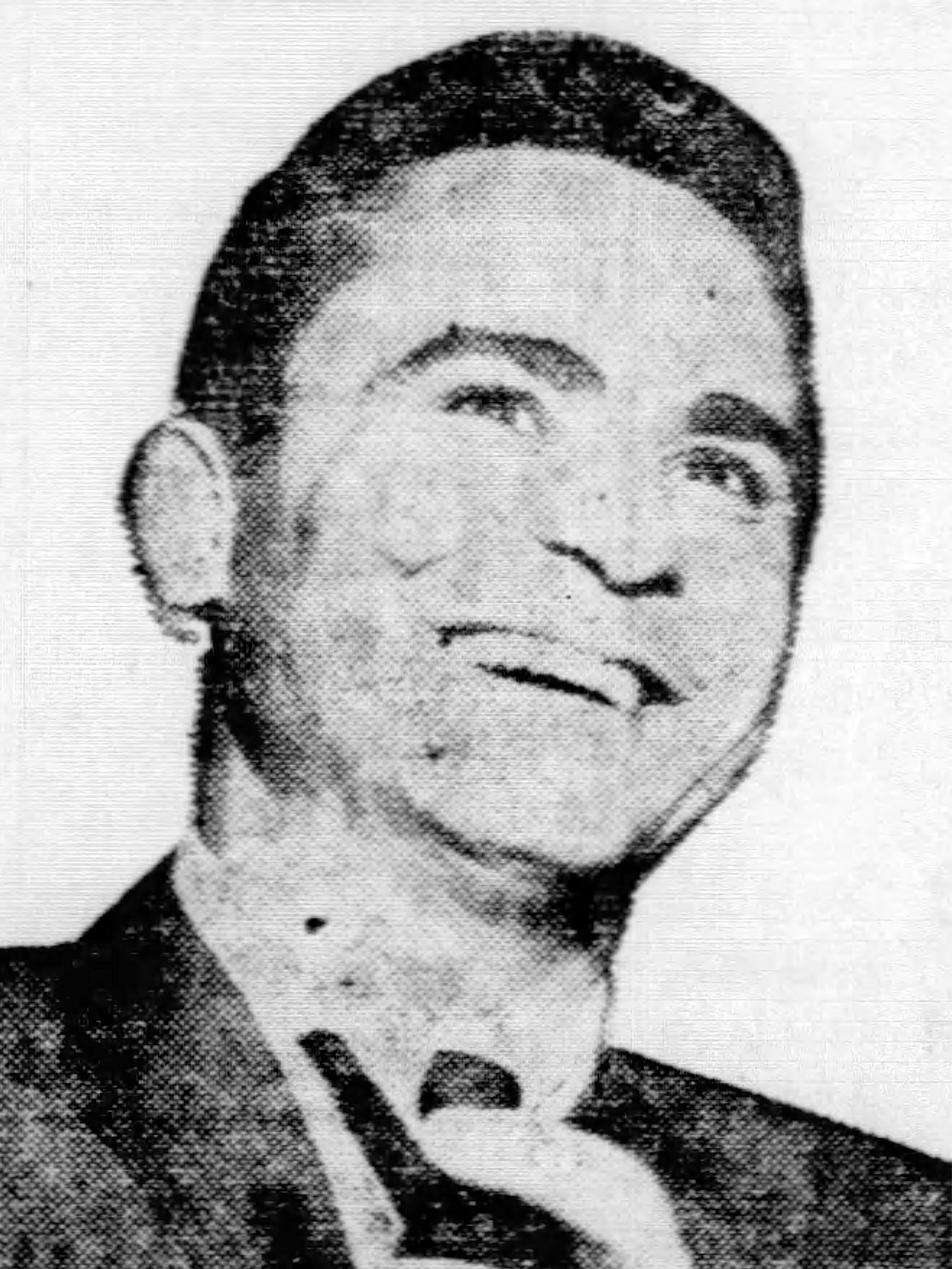
Fasi in 1959

In 1958, Fasi entered politics, winning his first race to represent his district in the senate of the Territory of Hawaii. His term was cut short when Hawaii achieved statehood and the territorial legislature was dissolved in 1959. After returning to his business, Fasi once again ran for office in 1965, winning a seat on the Honolulu City Council, where he served as a councilman through 1968.

=== Mayor of Honolulu ===
By the late 1960s, Fasi had gained a colorful reputation. The Honolulu Advertiser and Honolulu Star-Bulletin newspapers were using the words "firebrand," "trailblazer," and "maverick" to describe him. In 1969, Fasi was elected mayor of Honolulu as a Democrat and served through 1981 when he was defeated for the first time for re-election in the Democratic primary by Eileen Anderson. He then joined the Republican Party to stage a comeback and defeated Anderson in the 1984 election, returning to Honolulu Hale once again and serving as mayor through 1994, when he resigned to seek the Hawaii governorship. After losing his 2004 bid for the office of mayor, Fasi, then 84 years old, announced that he would not run for office again. As of 2020, he is the last Republican to have served as Mayor of Honolulu, Hawaii.

Fasi served 22 years as the mayor of Honolulu, the longest cumulative tenure of any Honolulu mayor.

=== Best Party ===
Fasi was a member of the Democratic Party in his early years. In 1984, he was persuaded by D. G. Anderson to quit and join the Republican Party. In 1994, both parties pushed him away in favor of younger, more popular candidates. In retaliation, Fasi established the Best Party of Hawaii and ran for Governor of Hawaii against Patricia F. Saiki and Benjamin J. Cayetano. John P. Craven ran against Fasi in the party's primary. Fasi lost the general election, but his party lives on as the Aloha ʻĀina Party of Hawaiʻi, with which it merged in 1997.

== Indictment for corruption ==
Fasi was indicted for bribery in 1977 on charges of accepting $500,000 in bribes. The charges were later dropped.

== Legacy ==
Much of Honolulu retains reminders of the Fasi era. He opened the Neal S. Blaisdell Center, and established TheBus, a public transportation system. Fasi also invented and built the Satellite City Hall system, established one of the nation's largest elected neighborhood board systems, and pushed for the construction of the H-POWER waste-to-energy plant. Fasi created the Summer Fun recreational program for children and the annual Honolulu City Lights winter festival. Fasi popularized the shaka, a local hand gesture, when he ordered it to become the city's signature logo and printed on all city signs and publications. He is also credited with transforming the Capitol District by bulldozing massive parking structures near the Hawaii State Capitol, ʻIolani Palace and Kawaiahaʻo Church to create large parcels of green space known as the Honolulu Civic Center. He also created a central office building for many of the city's departments.

In recognition of Fasi's service to Honolulu, Mayor Mufi Hannemann renamed both the Civic Center and the Municipal Building in July 2006. In order to do so, the Honolulu City Council amended its charter with the passage of Bill 76 (2005) CD 1, FD 1, which bypassed a ban on naming city and county sites in honor of living persons. The Mayor Frank F. Fasi Civic Center and Mayor Frank F. Fasi Municipal Building now stand as memorials to him.

== Death ==
Fasi died at his home of natural causes on February 3, 2010. He was 89.

== Organization membership ==
Frank Fasi was a member of the following organizations:

- American Legion
- Rotary International
- Sigma Nu
- Veterans of Foreign Wars

== Electoral history ==
Frank F. Fasi Election Summary
Year	Race	Election	Party	Outcome
1958	Territorial Senator	General	Democrat	Won
1959	Congress Class 1 Senator	Special	Democrat	Lost
1965	Honolulu City Councilman	General	Democrat	Won
1967	Honolulu City Councilman	General	Democrat	Won
1968	Mayor of Honolulu	General	Democrat	Won
1972	Mayor of Honolulu	General	Democrat	Won
1974	Governor of Hawaii	Primary	Democrat	Lost to George R. Ariyoshi (D)
1976	Mayor of Honolulu	General	Democrat	Won
1978	Governor of Hawaii	Primary	Democrat	Lost to George R. Ariyoshi (D)
1980	Mayor of Honolulu	Primary	Democrat	Lost to Eileen Anderson (D)
1982	Governor of Hawaii	General	Independent Democrat	Lost to George R. Ariyoshi (D)
1984	Mayor of Honolulu	General	Republican	Won
1988	Mayor of Honolulu	General	Republican	Won
1992	Mayor of Honolulu	General	Republican	Won
1994	Governor of Hawaii	General	Best	Lost to Benjamin J. Cayetano (D)
1996	Mayor of Honolulu	General	Nonpartisan	Lost to Jeremy Harris (N-P)
2000	Mayor of Honolulu	General	Nonpartisan	Lost to Jeremy Harris (N-P)
2003	Congress 2nd District	Special	Nonpartisan	Lost to Ed Case (D)
2004	Mayor of Honolulu	General	Nonpartisan	Lost to Mufi Hannemann (N-P)

Party political offices
New seat	Democratic nominee for U.S. Senator from Hawaii (Class 1); 1959	Succeeded by Thomas Gill
New political party	Best Party nominee for Governor of Hawaii; 1994	Succeeded by None
Political offices
Preceded by Neal Blaisdell	Mayor of Honolulu; 1969–1981	Succeeded by Eileen Anderson
Preceded by Eileen Anderson	Mayor of Honolulu; 1985–1994	Succeeded by Jeremy Harris
