= Ann Kobayashi =

American politician

Ann H. Kobayashi
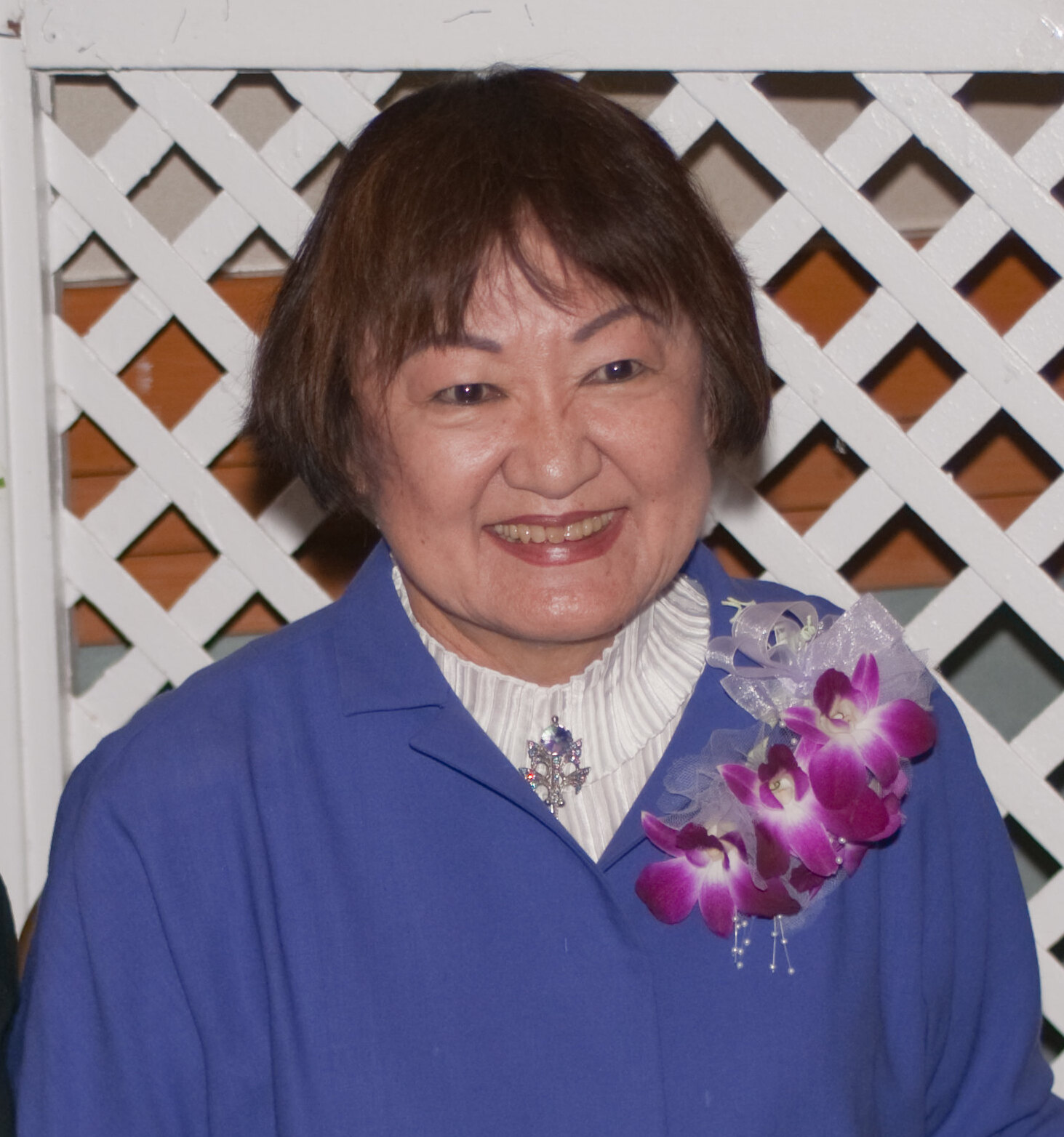
- Kobayashi in 2010

Member of the Honolulu City Council from the 5th district
- In office August 8, 2009 – January 2, 2021
- Preceded by: Duke Bainum
- Succeeded by: Calvin Say
- In office 2002–2008
- Succeeded by: Duke Bainum

Member of the Hawaii Senate from the 10th district
- In office 1981–1994

Personal details
- Born: April 10, 1937 (age 89) Honolulu, Hawaii
- Party: Democratic
- Other political affiliations: Republican (before 1988)
- Spouse: Paul Kobayashi (divorced)
- Children: 3 (Dale, Mark and Susan)
- Education: Pembroke College and Northwestern University
- Occupation: Politician, businesswoman
- Website: annkobayashi.com

Ann Hayashi Kobayashi (born April 10, 1937) is an American politician and businesswoman from Honolulu, Hawaii. She was a member of the Honolulu City Council, representing District 5 from 2009 to 2021. She previously held the same City Council seat between 2002 and 2008, but resigned from the seat to unsuccessfully run for Mayor of Honolulu against incumbent Mufi Hannemann. She was also a member of the Hawaii Senate between 1981 and 1994, having held elected office in Hawaii for over three decades.

== Personal life ==
Ann Kobayashi was born April 10, 1937, in Honolulu to Mori and Florence Hayashi. She grew up with her brother Roy Hayashi near Punchbowl Crater, later moving with her family to Nu‘uanu Valley.

Kobayashi graduated from President Theodore Roosevelt High School before attending Pembroke College in Brown University and Northwestern University.

She was married to Paul Kobayashi until their divorce. She has three children, including former state representative Dale Kobayashi.

== Political career ==
From 1981 to 1994, Kobayashi represented the Manoa area in the Hawaii Senate. During that time, she was chairwoman of the State Senate's Ways and Means Committee for two years. She switched parties from Republican to Democratic in July 1988 due to "disagreement with the recent conservative turn of the Hawaii Republican Party."

In 1994, Kobayashi ran for Mayor of Honolulu but lost. In 1997, she was the Executive Assistant to Mayor Jeremy Harris, and from 1997 to 2002 she worked in the State Executive office as a Special Assistant to Governor Ben Cayetano.

In 2002, Kobayashi successfully ran for Honolulu City Council District 5. She gave up her council seat in 2008 when she again ran for Mayor of Honolulu. She lost the election, and her council seat was won by Duke Bainum, who ran unopposed. Bainum, however, died on June 9, 2009, leaving the council seat vacant. The special election that was held resulted in Kobayashi being declared the winner on August 8 with more than 37 percent of the vote.

== See also ==
- List of American politicians who switched parties in office
