= Rod Tam =

American businessman and politician (1953–2019)

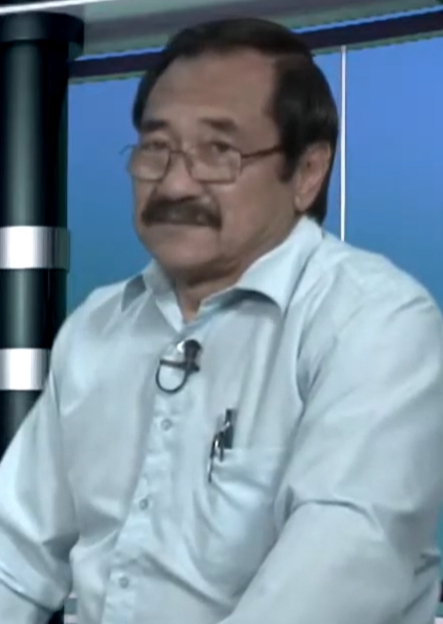

Member of the Honolulu City Council from the 6th district
- In office 2002–2010
- Succeeded by: Tulsi Gabbard

Member of the Hawaii Senate
- In office 1994–2002

Member of the Hawaii House of Representatives
- In office 1982–1994

Personal details
- Born: Rodney H. C. G. Tam; October 3, 1953 Honolulu, Territory of Hawaii
- Died: May 15, 2019 (aged 65) Honolulu, Hawaii, U.S.
- Party: Republican
- Other political affiliations: Democratic (before 2016)
- Education: University of Hawaii at Manoa

Rodney H. C. G. Tam (October 3, 1953 – May 15, 2019) was an American businessman and politician from the state of Hawaii.

== Biography ==
Born in Honolulu, Tam attended California State University and Kapiʻolani Community College. He received his bachelor's degree from University of Hawaiʻi at Mānoa.

== Career ==
Tam began his career as a budget and research analyst, and was also involved with the life insurance business. Tam became a Democratic representative of the Hawaii House of Representatives in 1982. Following a twelve-year term, he was appointed as a member of the state's Senate in 1992, serving until 2002. He was elected to the Honolulu city council before leaving office in 2010 in an unsuccessful bid to become the city's mayor.

In 2016, Tam made a return to politics as a Republican, running for the office of the Hawaii Senate representing District 13. He lost the election to Democrat Karl Rhoads, receiving a total of 3,824 (25.1%) votes.

=== Controversy ===
In November 2011, Tam pleaded guilty to stealing money from the city and violating campaign spending laws, and sentenced to two days in jail and 338 hours of community service.

== Death ==
In January 2019, Tam was diagnosed with leukemia, and died of complications of the disease on May 15, 2019, at the age of 65. He was survived by his wife, Lynette, and their two children.
