= Jeremy Harris (politician) =

American politician

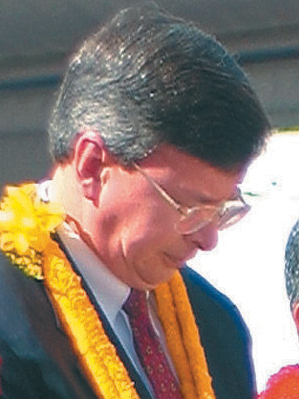

11th Mayor of Honolulu
- In office September 1994 – January 2, 2005
- Preceded by: Frank Fasi
- Succeeded by: Mufi Hannemann

Personal details
- Born: December 7, 1950 (age 75) Wilmington, Delaware, U.S.
- Party: Democratic
- Spouse: Ramona Sachiko Akui (m. 1989–2008)
- Education: University of Hawaiʻi at Mānoa; University of California, Irvine
- Profession: Marine biologist

Jeremy Harris (born December 7, 1950) is an American politician who was the 11th Mayor of Honolulu, Hawaii, from 1994 to 2005. A biologist by training, Harris started his political career as a delegate to the 1978 Hawaiʻi State Constitutional Convention. While Harris was chief executive of the City & County of Honolulu, the city was named "America's Greatest City" by the official American governance journal, Governing Magazine. Harris is the founder of the China-U.S. Conference of Mayors and Business Leaders and the Japan-American Conference of Mayors and Chamber of Commerce Presidents. He lives in Kalihi Valley on the island of O'ahu.

== Early years ==
Born and raised in Wilmington, Delaware, Harris moved to Honolulu to study at the University of Hawaiʻi at Mānoa, where he obtained dual undergraduate degrees in related biology fields. Upon graduation, Harris went on to the University of California, Irvine, where he obtained his master's degree in population and environmental biology, specializing in urban ecosystems. He returned to Hawaiʻi and settled on the island of Kauaʻi, where he was a professor at Kauaʻi Community College and marine advisor with the University of Hawaiʻi Sea Grant Program.

== Political career ==
Harris was elected by his fellow Kauaʻi residents as their delegate to the 1978 Hawaii State Constitutional Convention. The convention of 1978 came to be recognized as one of the most important events in Hawaiʻi history as from its body of delegates, many would become future "giants of Hawaiʻi politics" as the media would later recall. Harris debated alongside John D. Waiheʻe III, future governor of Hawaii, as well as future legislative leaders Carol Fukunaga, Helene Hale, Les Ihara Jr., Barbara Marumoto and Joseph M. Souki.

In 1979, Harris was elected to the Kauai County Council where he served a single two-year term. In 1984, he joined the City & County of Honolulu as executive assistant to Mayor Frank Fasi. He was soon promoted to deputy managing director and then managing director. In 1994, Fasi resigned as mayor of Honolulu and in the line of succession, Harris assumed the office.

== Mayor of Honolulu ==
Harris won a special election to become mayor of Honolulu outright in September 1994. He was re-elected in 1996 and 2000, appealing mostly to Chinese American, Filipino American and Japanese American communities. During his tenure, Honolulu residents voted to limit mayors to two four-year terms and thus made Harris ineligible for re-election in 2004. Former members of the Honolulu City Council Duke Bainum and Mufi Hannemann and former mayor Frank F. Fasi ran to succeed Harris, with Hannemann ultimately the victor.

Harris is recognized as having executed the most complete government system overhaul in Honolulu history. He reorganized all municipal departments mostly by mergers to streamline all services provided by the city and county. He also curtailed urban sprawl by reforming the system of land use planning to preserve open spaces and agricultural districts. Particularly during his first term, his management skills and those of his chief assistants were marginal and millions of dollars were embezzled or wasted as a result.

Harris's most ambitious and controversial project was 21st Century Oahu: A Shared Vision for the Future. 21st Century Oahu is a community based visioning program where neighborhoods would be given some control and CIP funding priority over their own community development, urban planning and beautification projects. Hundreds of public safety, environment, transportation, cultural and recreation construction projects were initiated and many completed as an outgrowth of Harris's 21st Century Oahu project.

== Gubernatorial campaign of 2002 ==
Harris was considered a favorite to win the 2002 race for governor of Hawaiʻi. However, high-level Democratic Party insiders who had backed fellow Democrats against Harris in 1994, 1996 and 2000 did not want to relinquish the governorship and party leadership to this independent-minded Democrat, and thus fought against his candidacy, beginning with a public campaign demanding Harris resign as mayor if he intended to run for governor. In the spring of 2002, local news media reported allegations of campaign finance wrongdoing by some of Harris's staffers. Despite polling close to presumptive Republican nominee Linda Lingle, Harris bowed out of the gubernatorial race. Hawaiʻi Democratic leaders then backed incumbent Lieutenant Governor Mazie Hirono, a favorite of Sen. Daniel Inouye, for the nomination instead.

== Legacy ==
He built the Marine Education Center at the Hanauma Bay Nature Preserve, continued the Waikiki Revitalization project started by Mayor Fasi that changed the look of Waikīkī's main thoroughfares, Queen's Surf Beach, Kuhio Beach and Kapiolani Park Bandstand, established torchlighting ceremonies and hula performances every night at Waikiki, and started Brunch on the Beach. However, critics of Harris, including his successor Mufi Hannemann, contend that these programs came at the expense of basic city services and infrastructure.

Harris has the distinction of being the only mayor to be elected more than once as United States Public Administrator of the Year by the American Society of Public Administration. Twice, Honolulu's "The Bus" was honored as America's best transportation system. Other foremost national societies named Honolulu first on the list of Kid Friendly Cities as well as the most digitally and technologically advanced city in the United States.

Harris made waves on the international stage as the founder of the Mayors' Asia-Pacific Environmental Summit. Delegates in 1999, who included over 400 leaders from the Asia-Pacific Rim nations, voted to establish a permanent secretariat in Honolulu in Harris's honor. Harris also established the Pacific Islands Environmental Symposium, the China-U.S. Conference of Mayors and Business Leaders, the Asia Pacific Urban Technology Institute and the Japan-American Conference of Mayors and Chamber of Commerce Presidents.

== Personal life ==
Harris met Ramona Sachiko Akui while they were both working for the City and County of Honolulu, and they married in June 1989. They divorced in 2008.

Preceded by Frank Fasi	Mayor of Honolulu; 1994 - 2004	Succeeded by Mufi Hannemann
