= Mayor of Honolulu =

Executive officer of the City and County of Honolulu, Hawaii

Mayor of the City and County of Honolulu
- Seal of the City and County of Honolulu

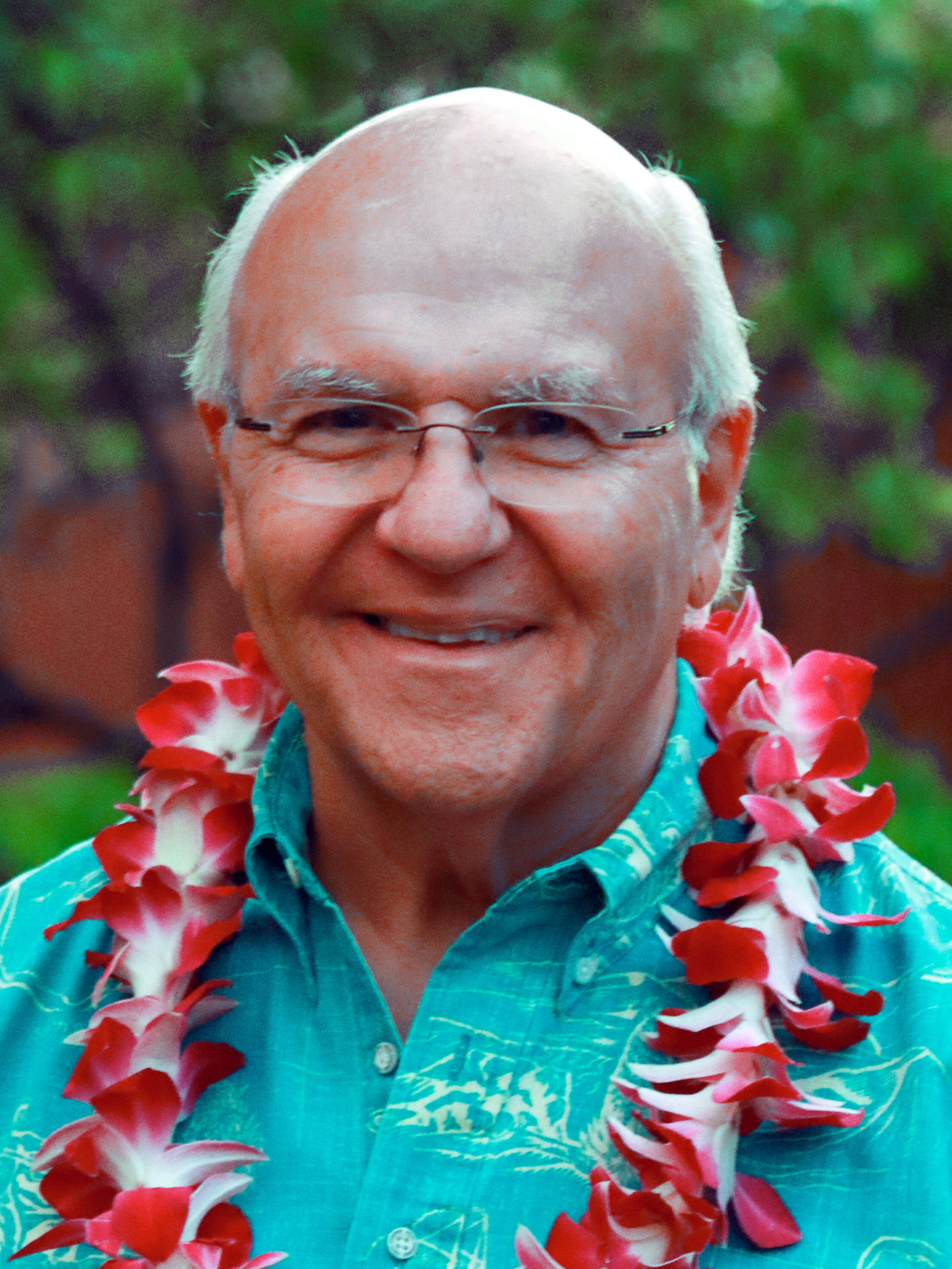
- Incumbent; Rick Blangiardi since January 2, 2021
- Term length: 4 years; Maximum of 2 consecutive full terms
- Inaugural holder: Joseph James Fern
- Formation: 1909
- Website: Office of the Mayor

The mayor of Honolulu is the chief executive officer of the City and County of Honolulu. An office established in 1900 and modified in 1907, the mayor of Honolulu is elected by universal suffrage of residents of Honolulu to no more than two four-year terms. The City and County of Honolulu's elected officials include the mayor, the prosecuting attorney, and councilmembers representing nine districts.

The mayor of Honolulu has full control over appointment and removal of administrators, is invested with absolute control over department heads, wields veto power over the Honolulu City Council and has substantial control over the budget, totaling in excess of US$1 billion.

== Honolulu Hale and other offices ==
The mayor of Honolulu conducts official business from Honolulu Hale, the historic city hall building of Honolulu constructed in 1928 in classical Spanish villa architectural styles. The building is located at the northeast corner of King and Punchbowl streets in the Hawaii Capital Historic District near downtown Honolulu. Other administrative officers under the mayor of Honolulu work from separate municipal buildings on the larger civic campus of which Honolulu Hale is a part.

== Domestic policy ==
From the courtyard of Honolulu Hale, the mayor of Honolulu is mandated by the City and County charters to make an annual State of the City address. In this speech, the mayor of Honolulu outlines the administrative and legislative agenda for the year. It is also a summation of the budget to be implemented compared to the budget of the previous year.

The mayor of Honolulu also organizes the major public services managed by the mayor’s office. The mayor oversees dozens of departments, including: Honolulu Board of Water Supply, Honolulu Fire Department, Honolulu Police Department and the Oʻahu Civil Defense Agency. Unlike most United States mayors, the mayor of Honolulu does not oversee any schools, a jurisdiction of the Hawaiʻi State Department of Education.

== Managing director ==
Assisting the mayor of Honolulu in overseeing these departments and other domestic policy issues is the managing director of Honolulu. The managing director's most important role is to serve as acting mayor in absence or resignation. The current managing director is Krishna Jayaram.

== Foreign policy ==
Many people, including Jeffre Juliano and Robert K. Wrede have considered Honolulu to be the "Geneva of the Pacific" due to its commercial and trade, political and military, as well as academic influences over Asia and the Pacific Rim. Honolulu is the site of several international governmental and non-governmental organizations and summits, as well as the site of high-profile multinational military exercises called RIMPAC. RIMPAC is conducted by the commander-in-chief of the United States Pacific Command whose headquarters is in Honolulu’s Salt Lake subdivision.

The uniqueness of Honolulu’s significance to the global community has forced the mayor of Honolulu to assume a constant diplomatic role that goes beyond the foreign policy roles of almost all other United States mayors. The mayor of Honolulu serves as concurrent chairman of several multinational mayoral bodies and convenes special sessions of international summits regularly.

== First Lady of Honolulu ==
As a Hawaiian tradition, the wife of the mayor of Honolulu is honored with the ceremonial title of "First Lady of Honolulu." Honolulu is distinct in this tradition as most United States cities and towns reserve the title of "First Lady" to the wife of the state governor, the wife of the president of the United States or the wife of a visiting foreign head of government. Honolulu deemed it necessary to bestow the ceremonial title to reflect her role in relation to her husband’s extensive international responsibilities. The title is not codified in modern law but is an honorific.

== List of mayors of Honolulu ==
No.	Mayor	Took office	Left office	Tenure	Party	Election
1	Joseph J. Fern (1872–1920); 1st time	January 4, 1909	January 4, 1915	6 years, 0 days	Democratic	1908
1	Joseph J. Fern (1872–1920); 1st time	January 4, 1909	January 4, 1915	6 years, 0 days	Democratic	1910
1	Joseph J. Fern (1872–1920); 1st time	January 4, 1909	January 4, 1915	6 years, 0 days	Democratic	1912
2	John C. Lane (1872–1958)	January 4, 1915	January 4, 1917	2 years, 0 days	Republican	1914
(1)	Joseph J. Fern (1872–1920); 2nd time	January 4, 1917	February 20, 1920 (Note: Died in office.)	3 years, 47 days	Democratic	1916
(1)	Joseph J. Fern (1872–1920); 2nd time	January 4, 1917	February 20, 1920	3 years, 47 days	Democratic	1918
Vacant		February 20, 1920	February 26, 1920			
3	John H. Wilson (1871–1956); 1st time	February 26, 1920	January 2, 1927	6 years, 310 days	Democratic	1920
3	John H. Wilson (1871–1956); 1st time	February 26, 1920	January 2, 1927	6 years, 310 days	Democratic	1922
3	John H. Wilson (1871–1956); 1st time	February 26, 1920	January 2, 1927	6 years, 310 days	Democratic	1924
4	Charles N. Arnold (1880–1929)	January 2, 1927	January 1, 1929	1 year, 365 days	Republican	1926
(3)	John H. Wilson (1871–1956); 2nd time	January 1, 1929	January 3, 1931	2 years, 2 days	Democratic	1928
5	George F. Wright (1881–1938)	January 3, 1931	July 2, 1938	7 years, 180 days	Republican	1930
5	George F. Wright (1881–1938)	January 3, 1931	July 2, 1938	7 years, 180 days	Republican	1932
5	George F. Wright (1881–1938)	January 3, 1931	July 2, 1938	7 years, 180 days	Republican	1934
Vacant		July 2, 1938	July 15, 1938			
6	Charles Crane (1869–1958)	July 15, 1938	January 2, 1941	2 years, 171 days	Republican	1938
7	Lester Petrie (1878–1956)	January 2, 1941	January 2, 1949	8 years, 0 days	Democratic	1940
7	Lester Petrie (1878–1956)	January 2, 1941	January 2, 1949	8 years, 0 days	Democratic	1942
7	Lester Petrie (1878–1956)	January 2, 1941	January 2, 1949	8 years, 0 days	Democratic	1944
7	Lester Petrie (1878–1956)	January 2, 1941	January 2, 1949	8 years, 0 days	Democratic	1946
(3)	John H. Wilson (1871–1956); 3rd time	January 2, 1949	January 2, 1955	6 years, 0 days	Democratic	1948
(3)	John H. Wilson (1871–1956); 3rd time	January 2, 1949	January 2, 1955	6 years, 0 days	Democratic	1950
(3)	John H. Wilson (1871–1956); 3rd time	January 2, 1949	January 2, 1955	6 years, 0 days	Democratic	1952
8	Neal Blaisdell (1902–1975)	January 2, 1955	January 2, 1969	14 years, 0 days	Republican	1954
8	Neal Blaisdell (1902–1975)	January 2, 1955	January 2, 1969	14 years, 0 days	Republican	1956
8	Neal Blaisdell (1902–1975)	January 2, 1955	January 2, 1969	14 years, 0 days	Republican	1960
8	Neal Blaisdell (1902–1975)	January 2, 1955	January 2, 1969	14 years, 0 days	Republican	1964
9	Frank Fasi (1920–2010); 1st time	January 2, 1969	January 2, 1981	12 years, 0 days	Democratic	1968
9	Frank Fasi (1920–2010); 1st time	January 2, 1969	January 2, 1981	12 years, 0 days	Democratic	1972
9	Frank Fasi (1920–2010); 1st time	January 2, 1969	January 2, 1981	12 years, 0 days	Democratic	1976
10	Eileen Anderson (1928–2021)	January 2, 1981	January 2, 1985	4 years, 0 days	Democratic	1980
(9)	Frank Fasi (1920–2010); 2nd time	January 2, 1985	September 17, 1994 (Note: Fasi resigned to run unsuccessfully for Governor of Hawaii.)	9 years, 258 days	Republican	1984
(9)	Frank Fasi (1920–2010); 2nd time	January 2, 1985	September 17, 1994	9 years, 258 days	Republican	1988
(9)	Frank Fasi (1920–2010); 2nd time	January 2, 1985	September 17, 1994	9 years, 258 days	Republican	1992
11	Jeremy Harris (born 1950)	September 18, 1994	January 2, 2005	10 years, 106 days	Democratic	1994
11	Jeremy Harris (born 1950)	September 18, 1994	January 2, 2005	10 years, 106 days	Democratic	1996
11	Jeremy Harris (born 1950)	September 18, 1994	January 2, 2005	10 years, 106 days	Democratic	2000
12	Mufi Hannemann (born 1954)	January 2, 2005	July 20, 2010 (Note: Hannemann resigned to run unsuccessfully for Governor of Hawaii.)	5 years, 199 days	Democratic	2004
12	Mufi Hannemann (born 1954)	January 2, 2005	July 20, 2010	5 years, 199 days	Democratic	2008
–	Kirk Caldwell (born 1952); Acting	July 20, 2010	October 11, 2010	83 days	Democratic	–
13	Peter Carlisle (born 1952)	October 11, 2010	January 2, 2013	2 years, 83 days	Independent	2010 special
14	Kirk Caldwell (born 1952)	January 2, 2013	January 2, 2021	8 years, 0 days	Democratic	2012
14	Kirk Caldwell (born 1952)	January 2, 2013	January 2, 2021	8 years, 0 days	Democratic	2016
15	Rick Blangiardi (born 1946)	January 2, 2021	Incumbent	5 years, 316 days	Independent	2020
15	Rick Blangiardi (born 1946)	January 2, 2021	Incumbent	5 years, 316 days	Independent	2024

== Notable candidates and acting mayors ==
- Keith Amemiya
- D. G. Anderson
- Duke Bainum
- Kirk Caldwell, acting mayor of Honolulu from July to October 2010
- Charles Djou
- Colleen Hanabusa
- Patsy Mink

== Resources ==
- City & County of Honolulu
- Agencies and Departments

== See also ==
- Timeline of Honolulu
