= Kirk Caldwell =

American politician (born 1952)

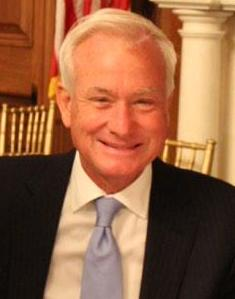
- Caldwell in 2015

14th Mayor of Honolulu
- In office January 2, 2013 – January 2, 2021
- Preceded by: Peter Carlisle
- Succeeded by: Rick Blangiardi
- In office July 20, 2010 – October 11, 2010; Acting
- Preceded by: Mufi Hannemann
- Succeeded by: Peter Carlisle

Majority Leader of the Hawaii House of Representatives
- In office 2007–2008
- Preceded by: Marcus Oshiro
- Succeeded by: Blake Oshiro

Member of the Hawaii House of Representatives from the 24th district
- In office November 2002 – November 2008
- Preceded by: Redistricted
- Succeeded by: Isaac Choy

Personal details
- Born: Kirk William Caldwell; September 4, 1952 (age 74) Waipahu, Hawaii
- Party: Democratic
- Spouse: Donna Tanoue
- Children: 1
- Education: Tufts University (BA, MA); University of Hawaii, Manoa (JD)
- Website: Campaign website

Kirk William Caldwell (born September 4, 1952) is an American politician who served as the mayor of Honolulu, Hawaii, from 2013 to 2021. A member of the Democratic Party, Caldwell also held the position of acting mayor in 2010 following the resignation of Mayor Mufi Hannemann. Caldwell announced that he would be running for the Democratic nomination in the 2022 Hawaii gubernatorial election in September 2021, but withdrew the following May.

== Career ==
Caldwell represented the 24th Representative District in the Hawaii State House of Representatives of the Hawaii State Legislature from 2002 to 2008, serving as the House Majority Leader between 2007 and 2008. He left the race for reelection to the House of Representatives to run for City Council in Honolulu. Caldwell was unable to run for council as he had not formally withdrawn from the election for the House of Representatives.

On July 20, 2010, Caldwell assumed the position of interim mayor after Mufi Hannemann resigned to compete in the 2010 Hawaii gubernatorial election. Caldwell held the office of mayor until a special election was held to determine a permanent successor.

Caldwell served as the acting mayor of Honolulu, Hawaii's capital and largest city, during the tsunami evacuation in the absence of Mayor Hannemann following the 2010 Chile earthquake.

Caldwell lost to former Honolulu Prosecuting Attorney Peter Carlisle in the 2010 special mayoral election.

Caldwell ran a successful campaign in the 2012 Honolulu mayoral election. He finished second in the primary election, ahead of incumbent mayor Carlisle. He faced former Hawaii Governor Ben Cayetano in the 2012 election on November 6, 2012, and won the election by 7.8%.

Caldwell narrowly won reelection on November 8, 2016, after facing a runoff with former Republican congressman Charles Djou, 52.2% to 47.8%. Though both candidates supported the municipal rail project, cost overruns were an issue, as well as Caldwell's alleged interference with the Ethics Commission. Labor group support was split between the pair.

In June 2018, Caldwell responded to an increasing homeless population by having legislation crafted to outlaw living in parks, sleeping and resting on sidewalks, and obstructing sidewalks with personal possessions, combined with aggressive referrals to shelters. The city had made similar efforts that resulted in a win for homeless advocates at the cost of a half million dollars.

An April 2021 poll conducted by Hawaii News Now found that only 28% of Hawaii voters held a positive opinion of Caldwell, while 53% held a negative opinion.

On September 10, 2021, Caldwell announced that he would be a candidate for the Democratic nomination for Governor of Hawaii in the 2022 Hawaii gubernatorial election to succeed Gov. David Ige. He withdrew from the gubernatorial election on May 4, 2022, citing both a lack of funding for his campaign and insufficient political momentum.

== Personal ==
His wife, Donna Tanoue, was chairwoman of the Federal Deposit Insurance Corporation from 1998 to 2001. They have one child, a daughter named Maya.

Political offices
Preceded by Mufi Hannemann	Mayor of Honolulu; Acting; 2010	Succeeded by Peter Carlisle
Preceded by Peter Carlisle	Mayor of Honolulu; 2013–2021	Succeeded by Rick Blangiardi
