= Duke Bainum =

American politician (1952-2009)

Mark Edmund "Duke" Bainum

Member of the Hawaii House of Representatives from the 30th district
- In office 1990–1994
- Preceded by: Joan Hayes
- Succeeded by: Romy M. Cachola

Member of the Honolulu City Council
- In office 1995-2003, 2008-2009

Personal details
- Born: July 21, 1952 Takoma Park, Maryland
- Died: June 9, 2009 (aged 56) Honolulu, Hawaii
- Resting place: Diamond Head Memorial Park
- Party: Democratic
- Spouse: Jennifer Ann Harumi Toma (née)
- Children: Z Bainum; Kona Bainum; Johnny Lesseos (step); Jennifer Lesseos (step)
- Education: University of Maryland; John A. Burns School of Medicine, University of Hawaiʻi at Mānoa
- Occupation: General practitioner
- Profession: Physician
- Website: www.dukebainum.com

Mark Edmund "Duke" Bainum (July 21, 1952 – June 9, 2009) was an American politician and physician. Bainum served in the Hawaii State House of Representatives as a member of the Hawaii Democratic Party and was elected in a nonpartisan race to the Honolulu City Council and held various committee chairmanships during his tenure. In 2004, Bainum ran for Mayor of Honolulu in the state of Hawaii, but lost to former White House Aide Mufi Hannemann. Bainum was married to Jennifer Toma Bainum.

== Education and medical career ==
According to a 2012 interview with Katie Sullivan, Bainum was born in Takoma Park, Maryland to Irvin C. Bainum, a banker, and Evea J. Bainum, and raised "dirt poor" with his older brother Timothy. His paternal uncle, Stewart W. Bainum, Sr., was the founder of Choice Hotels, a hotel chain, and HCR Manor Care, a retirement facility chain.

In 1980, he graduated from the University of Maryland School of Medicine and moved to Honolulu, Hawaii to attend the University of Hawaii Surgical Residency Program at the John A. Burns School of Medicine. While there, Bainum's colleagues nicknamed him "Duke" because his Arkansas accent made him sound like John Wayne. He reportedly liked it so much that he officially made part of it his legal name in 1987. Bainum completed his internship two years later. After becoming a physician, Bainum treated patients in Nepal for three months, helped Kauai residents after Hurricane Iniki, and from 1987 to 2004 was an on-call doctor at the Sex Abuse Treatment Center in Honolulu.

== Politics ==
Bainum entered politics when he served on the Ala Moana/Kaka'ako Neighborhood Board between 1987 and 1989. He then chaired the McCully-Mo'ili'ili Neighborhood Board from 1989 to 1990. From 1990–94, he served in the State House and was then elected to the City Council from 1995-2003. In 2004, Bainum decided to run for Honolulu mayor against Mufi Hannemann, spending nearly twice as much as Hannemann. Considered the early front-runner, he lost by a narrow margin (1,300 votes). In January 2008, Bainum again returned to the political ring and won Honolulu City Council seat District 5, running unopposed, although not without controversy, as some questioned whether he was a legal resident of Hawaii at the time.

== Religion ==
Bainum attended New Hope Christian Fellowship and was an Evangelical Christian.

== Death ==
Around 9:30 pm on June 9, 2009, Bainum reportedly experienced chest pains while driving. He pulled over and called 911. Paramedics took him to the Queen's Medical Center, where he later died. The medical examiner reported the cause of death as an aortic aneurysm. A senior adviser to Bainum said that there were no other warning signs other than chest pain, that Bainum "was feeling well at work" and "having fun chasing the kids around in the evening". Bainum's unexpected death was the second to hit the City Council in six months (Barbara Marshall died in February).

== Resources ==
- Duke Bainum for Mayor of Honolulu 2004
