= Mufi Hannemann =

American politician and businessman (born 1954)

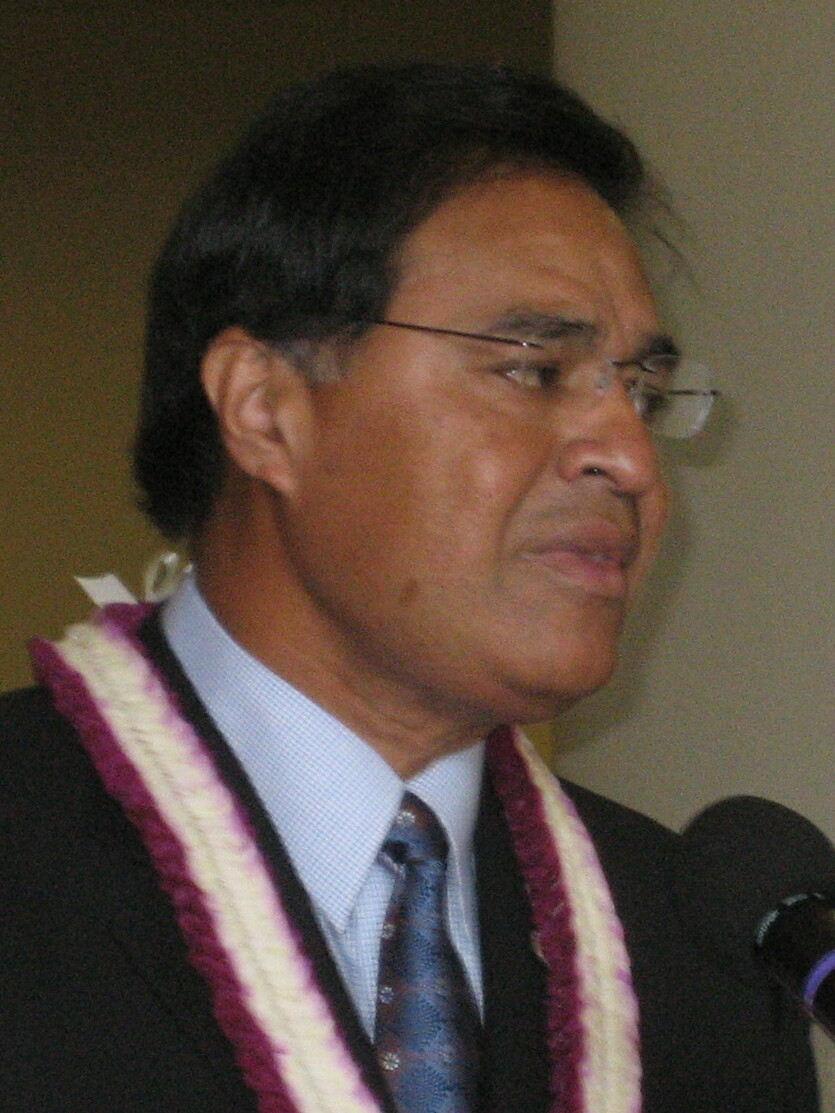
- Hannemann in 2008

12th Mayor of Honolulu
- In office January 2, 2005 – July 20, 2010
- Preceded by: Jeremy Harris
- Succeeded by: Kirk Caldwell

Personal details
- Born: Muliufi Francis Hannemann; July 16, 1954 (age 72) Honolulu, Territory of Hawaii
- Party: Democratic (Before 2014); Independent (2014–present)
- Spouse: Gail Mukaihata
- Education: Harvard University (BA)

Muliufi Francis (Mufi) Hannemann (born July 16, 1954) is an American politician, businessman, and non-profit executive. He was elected twice as Mayor of Honolulu in 2004 and 2008. Hannemann has served as a special assistant in Washington, D.C. with the Department of the Interior, where he was selected for a White House fellowship in the Reagan administration under Vice President George H. W. Bush. He also served as chairman of the Honolulu City Council. He is the first person of Samoan descent and the second member of the Church of Jesus Christ of Latter-day Saints to serve as Mayor of Honolulu (Neal Blaisdell was the first).

== Early life, education, and academic career ==
Hannemann was raised in the Honolulu community of Kalihi by his German-Samoan father, Gustav Arthur Tafu Tupulo Hannemann III, and Samoan mother, Faiaso Soli'ai, whose grandfather High Chief Muliufi Soliai was one of the original signatories to the deed of cession that transformed Eastern Samoa and the Manua Islands into the US Territory of American Samoa. He attended Fern, Puʻuhale and Kalihi Kai elementary schools up to the seventh grade before being accepted to the ʻIolani School with a scholarship. He graduated with honors and competed in basketball and American football. In the fall of 1972, Hannemann left the Hawaiian Islands to attend Harvard College where he was elected freshman class president and was varsity basketball letterman. Upon graduation from Harvard in 1976, Hannemann continued his studies as a Fulbright Scholar at Victoria University of Wellington in New Zealand. He returned to Honolulu after his studies to become an educator at his alma mater, Iolani School. He was a history teacher and basketball coach.

== Business career ==
In 1981, he took on advisory role on the board of the Schutter Foundation, a not-for-profit civil rights advocacy group started by Hawaii criminal defense attorney David Schutter. From 1984–1991 his business career was with C. Brewer & Co., at one time one of Hawaii's oldest agri-businesses. At Brewer, he was Vice-President of Corporate Development, Marketing and Public Affairs. He is also the Principal and Founder of MFH Enterprises, a professional consulting firm that does business in Hawaii, the mainland US and the Pacific Rim. In July 2015, he returned to his former position in Hawaii's number one industry, tourism, as the CEO and President of the Hawaii Lodging and Tourism Association. HLTA is the state's largest private visitor industry organization and he previously served as the organization's leader from 2010–2011.

== Political career ==
=== 1970s ===
==== Carter administration ====
After his teaching career, Hannemann entered government service as a special assistant to President Jimmy Carter, working with the United States Department of the Interior.

==== Ariyoshi administration ====
Hannemann was appointed by Governor of Hawaiʻi George Ariyoshi as a special assistant.

=== 1980s ===
==== 1986 congressional election ====
In 1986, Hannemann ran for the First District in the U.S. House that was being vacated by Cecil Heftel, who sought the governorship that year. Hannemann won the Democratic primary election but lost the special election to fill Heftel's unexpired term to Neil Abercrombie. He again lost in the general election to Republican candidate Pat Saiki.

==== Bush administration ====
He then served as staff assistant to Vice President George H. W. Bush.

=== 1990s ===
==== 1990 congressional election ====
In 1990, he ran for Congress again, this time for the Second District seat vacated by Daniel Akaka, who was eventually elected to the U.S. Senate. He lost the Democratic primary to Patsy Mink, who eventually won the seat.

==== Waihee administration ====
Hannemann would again be tapped for government service in 1991, appointed by Governor John D. Waiheʻe III as Chairman of the Hawaii Pro Bowl Host Committee, Chairman of the Task Force on Homeporting, Director of the Hawaii Office of International Relations and Director of the Hawaii Department of Business, Economic Development and Tourism.

==== Clinton administration ====
Having directed various state agencies of the Government of Hawaii, Hannemann was appointed by President Bill Clinton to serve at the federal level once again as United States Representative to the South Pacific Commission.

==== Honolulu City Council ====
In 1994, Hannemann was elected to the Honolulu City Council representing Aiea and Pearl City, and in 1996 he founded the Pacific Century Fellows Program modeled after the White House Fellows Program. He was re-elected to his seat in 1998. He served as Council Chairman from 1998 to 1999. Differences in opinion with then-Mayor Jeremy Harris led to his resignation from the Council in 2000 to run against Harris. Harris won re-election in the September 2000 non-partisan election with enough votes to avoid a run-off that November.

=== 2000s ===
==== Bush administration ====
In the administration of President George W. Bush, Hannemann served in the United States Department of Labor as a member of the President's Council on the 21st Century Workforce.

==== Mayor of Honolulu ====
In 2004 Hannemann again ran for Mayor, this time to replace Harris, who was unable to seek a third full term as Mayor due to term limits. His opponent was former City Council colleague Duke Bainum. The race was considered one of the fiercest and most expensive in the city's history, with both candidates sharply criticizing the other's stands and character. Bainum received the most votes in the September election, but failed to receive the necessary majority to avoid a run-off against Hannemann. In November, Hannemann narrowly won the election with a margin of about 1,300 votes out of nearly 300,000 cast.

Hannemann was sworn in as mayor on January 2, 2005. In his first State of the City address, Hannemann pledged to concentrate on fiscal restraint and basic city services, claiming a contrast between himself and his predecessor. One of his major accomplishments as mayor was overseeing the planning for the Honolulu High-Capacity Transit Corridor Project, which will provide a rail transit system for Honolulu. The project eventually became a major issue when Hannemann came up for reelection in 2008, with his odds of success tied to public perception of it.

He is a member of the Mayors Against Illegal Guns Coalition, an organization formed in 2006 and co-chaired by New York City mayor Michael Bloomberg and Boston mayor Thomas Menino. He served as the Chair of the Tourism, Arts, Parks, Entertainment, and Sports Committee of the U.S. Conference of Mayors.

Hannemann was longlisted for the 2008 World Mayor award.

In 2009, Hannemann was sworn into his second term as mayor of Honolulu by Bode Uale.

=== 2010s ===
==== 2010 gubernatorial election ====
On July 20, 2010, Hannemann resigned his position as mayor to compete in the 2010 Hawaii gubernatorial election. City Managing Director Kirk Caldwell assumed the position of interim mayor until a special election was held to determine a permanent replacement. On September 18, 2010, Hannemann lost the Democratic primary to Neil Abercrombie by approximately twenty-one percentage points.

==== 2012 congressional election ====
Hannemann announced his intention to run for Hawaii's 2nd Congressional district seat on August 30, 2011. The incumbent, Mazie Hirono, vacated the seat to run for the U.S. Senate seat then held by Daniel Akaka, who did not seek reelection in 2012. He lost the primary election to Tulsi Gabbard on August 11, 2012, by approximately twenty percentage points.

==== 2014 gubernatorial election ====
After considering a run for Republican nomination, Hannemann was an independent candidate for Governor, finishing third out of four candidates in the general election with 11.6% of the vote.

=== 2020s ===
==== 2020 Honolulu mayoral election ====
On May 31, 2020, Mufi Hannemann announced that he would be filing nomination papers to run for Honolulu Mayor again. On August 8, Hannemann conceded after finishing fifth in a field of 15 with only 9.92% of the primary vote.

== Personal life ==
Hannemann stands 6 feet 7 inches (2.01 m) in height. His brother Nephi Hannemann was a Polynesian actor and singer. His cousin, Jacob Hannemann, is a former Major League Baseball player.

Political offices
Preceded by Jeremy Harris	Mayor of Honolulu; 2005–2010	Succeeded by Kirk Caldwell
