= Lehua Fernandes Salling =

American politician

Member of the Hawaii Senate from the 7th district
- In office January 20, 1993 – January 20, 1999
- Preceded by: Gerald T. Hagino
- Succeeded by: Jonathan Chun

Member of the Hawaii Senate from the 25th district
- In office January 19, 1983 – January 20, 1993
- Preceded by: District created
- Succeeded by: Mary George

Delegate to the 1978 Hawaii State Constitutional Convention
- In office 1978–1978

Personal details
- Party: Democratic
- Spouse: Michael Salling
- Children: 1
- Relatives: William Fernandes (father); J. B. Fernandes (grandfather)
- Profession: Lawyer

Lehua Fernandes Salling (born December 6, 1949) is an American lawyer and former politician who served as a Democratic member of the Hawaii Senate from 1983 to 1999, representing districts on Kauaʻi. Her father, William Fernandes, and grandfather, J. B. Fernandes, both also served in the Hawaii Senate. As chair of the Senate transportation committee in the late 1980s, she blocked anti-drunk driving legislation supported by Mothers Against Drunk Driving, arguing that it violated civil liberties and due process. She became president pro tempore of the Senate in 1994 and lost the 1998 Democratic primary to Jonathan Chun.

== Early life and education ==
Salling was born on December 6, 1949. Her father William and grandfather J.B. had both been members of the Hawaii Senate and were active in politics. She was raised on the island of Kauaʻi.

== Career ==
=== Legal career ===
Salling passed the bar exam in 1976 and was subsequently issued a license to practice law in the state of Hawaii. She became active in community organization several years later, joining the petitioner's committee for SHOK (Stop High-Rise on Kauai), which advocated for legislation that would enforce a limit on construction on Kauaʻi. SHOK used the initiative process to attempt to force a vote on the issue. For a time she worked as her father's attorney at the law firm Fernandes Salling & Salling. In 1983 she joined a lawsuit by Frank Fasi, former mayor of Honolulu, against the The Honolulu Advertiser and the Honolulu Star-Bulletin that alleged the two papers were engaged in monopolistic activities. The lawsuit failed later the year, with the plaintiffs being held liable for the paper's legal fees.

=== Political career ===
In 1978, Salling was elected a delegate to the 1978 Hawaii State Constitutional Convention after a guerrilla campaign that leaned on her family's reputation in politics. Prior to running for office, she was a member of the Young Democrats of America. Salling ran for a seat in the Hawaii Senate against George Toyofuku in 1982, citing Toyofuku's failure to obtain chairmanship of any major committees. Toyofuku had previously unseated her father in 1970. She ran on a platform that emphasized the need for responsible development and a diversified economy. She won the primary and went on to win the general election. Salling was initially chairwoman of the Senate Hawaiian Programs Committee, but had the position stripped from her over a budget dispute. She and five other senators, who the Honolulu Star-Bulletin dubbed "Dissident Democrats," sued the Hawaii Senate for access to budget information and threatened to filibuster the budget's passage. The lawsuit failed but was appealed to the Supreme Court of Hawaii, where it failed again.

Salling ran for reelection in 1986, winning election unopposed. In 1990 she faced a challenge from Phil Tacbian, a former member of the state's Land Use Commission, but Salling defeated him in the primary and again won reelection unopposed in the general. In 1994 Salling was made president pro tempore of the Hawaii Senate. She won election to a fourth term unopposed later that year. She ran for reelection in 1998, facing a challenge from Jonathan Chun. She lost in the primary.

==== Anti-drunk driving legislation ====
In 1988, Salling became involved in a years-long dispute over proposed legislation to curb drunk driving in Hawaii. The legislation would have required Administrative License Suspension for anyone charged with a drunk driving offense and given the police the ability to order blood tests for suspected drunk drivers and was supported by Mothers Against Drunk Driving (MADD). Salling used her power as chairwoman of the transportation committee to block the legislation, an action that was criticized by the Hawaii Attorney General, Warren Price, and by MADD. Salling argued that the legislation was an encroachment on civil liberties and a violation of due process.

In 1990, the measure again came up in the Senate. She put forth a draft of the legislation that was rejected by the Hawaii House of Representatives, who argued that Salling's version would weaken drunk driving law in the state. Eventually a compromise version of the legislation, which contained no penalties for drivers who refused to drug testing, was passed. MADD led a public pressure campaign to reinstate those penalties, with over 1,000 calls being made to the Hawaii Senate daily in support of the campaign. The pressure campaign resulted in a special session of the legislature being called to debate the issue, with the Senate ultimately reinstating the penalties. Salling was the sole "no" vote against the changes.

In 1993, the Senate adopted a rule allowing bills to bypass the committee process and proceed automatically to a floor vote, partly in response to Salling's previous blocking of the anti-drunk driving legislation.

== Personal life ==
Salling is married to Michael Salling and has a son.
