= Initiatives and referendums in the United States =

In the politics of the United States, the process of initiatives and referendums allow citizens of many U.S. states to place legislation on the ballot for a statewide referendum or popular vote, either enacting new legislation or voting down existing legislation. Citizens or an organization might start a popular initiative to gather a predetermined number of signatures to qualify the measure for the ballot. The measure is placed on the ballot for the referendum, or actual vote.

Initiatives and referendums, along with recall elections and popular primary elections, were signature reforms from the Progressive Era (1896–1917) when people sought to moderate the power of parties and political bosses. These powers are written into several state constitutions, particularly in the West. Initiatives and referendums constitute a form of direct democracy. Since 1955, states have increasingly rescinded rights to initiatives and referendums; "the strongest predictor of anti-direct-democracy proposals is Republican control of the state legislature." There is currently no mechanism for popular initiatives at the federal (national) level.

The technical name of these types of votes used internationally is referendum, but within the United States they are commonly known as ballot measures, propositions or ballot questions. The term referendum in the United States normally refers specifically to questions about striking down enacted law, known internationally as the popular referendum.

== History ==
The Progressive Era was a period marked by reforms aimed at breaking the concentrated power, or monopoly, of certain corporations and trusts. Many Progressives believed that state legislatures were part of this problem and that they were essentially "in the pocket" of certain wealthy interests. They sought a method to counter this—a way in which average persons could become directly involved in the political process. One of the methods they came up with was the initiative and referendum. Through 2006, 2,231 statewide initiatives were held in the United States, of which 887 were successful.

== Types of initiatives and referendums ==
States that allow initiated constitutional amendments States that allow legislatively referred and direct initiative statutes, or legislatively referred and direct initiated constitutional amendments, and referendums. States that allow legislatively referred and indirect initiative statutes, or legislatively referred and direct initiated constitutional amendments, and referendums. (Michigan, Nevada, and Ohio) Illinois allows legislatively referred state statutes, or legislatively referred and direct initiated constitutional amendments. Florida allows legislatively referred and direct initiated constitutional amendments. States and federal district that allow initiated statutes Massachusetts allows legislatively referred and indirect initiative statutes, legislatively referred and indirect initiated constitutional amendments, and referendums, with the specific initiative petition term used for all directly voted initiatives. States that allow legislatively referred, indirect, and direct initiative statutes, or legislatively referred constitutional amendments, and referendums. (Utah and Washington) Idaho allows direct initiative statutes, or legislatively referred constitutional amendments, and referendums. States that allow indirect initiative statutes, or legislatively referred constitutional amendments, and referendums. (Alaska, Maine, and Wyoming. Maine also allows legislatively-referred state statutes) Washington, D.C., allows legislatively referred amendments to its charter, direct initiative statutes, and referendums. States that allow referendums States that allow legislatively referred state statutes, or legislatively referred constitutional amendments, and referendums. (Maryland and New Mexico) States that allow legislative referral only Kentucky allows legislatively referred state statutes and legislatively-referred constitutional amendments. States that allow legislatively referred constitutional amendments only.^{1} Delaware allows legislatively referred state statutes only.^{1}Mississippi technically would allow indirect initiated constitutional amendments, but this process is currently obsolete.

Initiatives and referendums—collectively known as "ballot measures", "propositions", or simply "questions"—differ from most legislation passed by representative democracies; ordinarily, an elected legislative body develops and passes laws. Initiatives and referendums, by contrast, allow citizens to vote directly on legislation.

In many U.S. states, ballot measures may originate by several different processes: Overall, 26 US states have initiative and/or veto referendum processes at the statewide level, and all states have at least one form of legislatively referred processes: 49 states have at least a legislatively referred process to amend their constitutions, and one state, Delaware, has a possibility of legislatively referred ballot measures to pass new statutes only. In all of these states except Delaware, to modify the state constitution, at least one form of ballot measure is mandatory, under sometimes greatly different processes from state to state, either for directly voting on a proposed modification, or voting on a ballot measure for choosing to call or not for the election of a state convention charged of modifying the state constitution. Washington, D.C., also has initiative and veto referendum processes. Additionally, multiple forms of direct democracy also exists at the local level, including in some states that otherwise do not have these forms of direct democracy at the state level, the availability of direct democracy measures at the local level varying by jurisdiction depending on state and local laws.

=== Initiatives ===
An initiative is a means through which any citizen or organization may gather a predetermined number of signatures to qualify a measure to be placed on a ballot, and to be voted upon in a future election. These may be further divided into constitutional amendments and statutory initiatives. Statutory initiatives typically require fewer signatures to qualify to be placed on a future ballot.

Initiatives can also be indirect, which means that after sufficient signatures to place a measure on the ballot are collected, the measure is first considered by a state or local legislative body. If the legislative body elects not to pass the proposed new law within a prescribed window of opportunity, the initiative must then be placed on the ballot. The details of the process vary by state. For example, in some states, another round of signatures is required to qualify an initiative for the ballot if the legislature does not approve it. In others, if the legislature passes a law determined to be substantially similar to the initiative, it precludes an election on the original initiative proposal, while in others the legislature must pass the initiative unaltered or it goes to the voters.

==== Initiated state constitutional amendment ====
An initiated constitutional amendment is an amendment to a state's constitution that results from petitioning by a state's citizens. By utilizing this initiative process, citizens can propose and vote on constitutional amendments directly, without need of legislative referral. When a sufficient number of citizens have signed a petition requesting it, a proposed constitutional amendment is then put to the vote.

In the United States, while no court or legislature needs to approve a proposal or the resultant initiated constitutional amendment, such amendments may be subject to judicial review and can be struck down if found to conflict with the U.S. Constitution. Most states that permit initiated constitutional amendments require approval by a simple majority of voters, although some states impose higher thresholds (for example, Florida requires 60% voter approval and Colorado requires 55%). Not all amendments proposed will receive sufficient support to be placed on the ballot. Of the 26 proposed petitions filed in the state of Florida in its 1994 general election, only three garnered sufficient support to be put to the vote.

==== Indirect initiated state constitutional amendment ====
The initiative process, for proposing constitutional amendments, may also, like for state statutes, be "direct" or "indirect". Among the 18 states that provide for citizen-initiated constitutional amendments, Massachusetts and Mississippi are the only two states with indirect initiated state constitutional amendment. In Massachusetts, if enough signatures are submitted for an initiated constitutional amendment, the initiative first goes to the legislature where it must garner approval in two successive legislative sessions from one-quarter of state senators and representatives voting together in a joint session. Massachusetts is the only state to have such a requirement for initiated constitutional amendments.

Before 2021 in Mississippi, if enough signatures were collected and submitted, the legislature had to either: approve the measure; ignore the measure (but it does not annul the measure, it still goes to the ballot); voting against the measure without providing for an alternative (but it does not annul the measure, it still goes to the ballot); or approve an alternative amendment to appear on the ballot alongside the original citizen proposal as a competing measure. In the cases when both of the contradicting measures were approved by voters, the measure with the most votes was the one that became law.

A May 2021 decision by the Mississippi Supreme Court nullified a voter-passed initiative that permitted medical marijuana in the state, with the 6–3 majority citing a fundamental flaw in the state's constitutional process that was viewed by media as effectively banning future use of indirect initiatives in the amendment process, barring a future constitutional amendment. The indirect initiative process, added to the state's constitution in the 1990s as Article 15, Section 273(3), requires that over a 1-year period, the sponsors obtain a total number of signatures equal to at least 12% of the total number of votes cast for governor in the state's last election for that office. Additionally, it requires that no more than 20% of the signatures required to place an initiative on the ballot come from any single congressional (i.e., U.S. House) district. At the time the indirect initiative process passed, Mississippi had five congressional districts, but the state lost one House seat in the reapportionment that followed the 2000 United States census. In the majority decision, Justice Josiah Coleman wrote, "Whether with intent, by oversight, or for some other reason, the drafters of section 273(3) wrote a ballot-initiative process that cannot work in a world where Mississippi has fewer than five representatives in Congress. To work in today's reality, it will need amending—something that lies beyond the power of the Supreme Court." Coleman added that from 2003 to 2015, the legislature had attempted six times to place an amendment on the ballot that would have changed the process to reflect Mississippi's current (and presumably future) House apportionment, but all attempts died in committee.

=== Referendum ===
Called Popular referendum, or alternatively Veto Referendum, Citizen referendum, Statute referendum, Statute remand, People's veto, or Citizen's veto, in which a predetermined number of signatures (typically lower than the number required for an initiative) qualifies a ballot measure for voting on repealing or not a specific state law. 23 states allow for citizens to initiate popular referendums, and one territory, the U.S. Virgin Islands. The popular referendum was first introduced in the United States by South Dakota in 1898, and first used in 1906 in Oregon, two years after the first initiative was used in 1904, also in Oregon.

=== Legislative referral ===
Legislative referral, also known as legislative referendum, or referendum bill in the state of Washington for legislatively referred state statute, in which the legislature puts proposed legislation up for popular vote (either voluntarily or, in the case of a constitutional amendment, as an obligatory part of the procedure). With the exception of Delaware, 49 US states allow legislatively referred state constitutional amendments.

=== Statute affirmation ===
Nevada is the only state to allow for statute affirmation. The statute affirmation allows the voters to collect signatures to place on ballot a question asking the state citizens to affirm a standing state law. If a majority vote to affirm the law, the state legislature will be barred from ever amending the law, and it can be amended or repealed only if approved by a majority of state citizens in a direct vote.

=== Automatic referrals ===
An automatic referral is question that is legally required to automatically be placed on the ballot. Many states have laws in their constitution requiring a question to hold a constitutional convention to appear before the voters after a scheduled amount of time.

=== Agricultural referendums ===
The United States Code requires national referendums before the authorization of marketing quotas for certain agricultural products including wheat, maize, milk, and rice. The responsibility of conducting these referendums is with the Secretary of Agriculture, and eligibility to vote is limited to producers of the agricultural product in question. A similar referendum system is in place for fishing quotas in both the New England and Gulf fishery management councils.

== Referendum law by state ==
Direct democracy in U.S. states and Washington, D.C.
State or territory	Initiative		Referendum	Legislative referral		Statute affirmation
State or territory	Statute	Constitutional	Referendum	Statute	Constitutional	Statute affirmation
Alabama	None	None	No	No	Yes	No
Alaska	Indirect	None	Yes	No	Yes	No
Arizona	Direct	Direct	Yes	Yes	Yes	No
Arkansas	Direct	Direct	Yes	Yes	Yes	No
California	Direct	Direct	Yes	Yes	Yes	No
Colorado	Direct	Direct	Yes	Yes	Yes	No
Connecticut	None	None	No	No	Yes	No
Delaware	None	None	No	Yes	No	No
District of Columbia	Direct	None*	Yes	No	Yes*	No
Florida	None	Direct	No	No	Yes	No
Georgia	None	None	No	No	Yes	No
Hawaii	None	None	No	No	Yes	No
Idaho	Direct	None	Yes	No	Yes	No
Illinois	None	Direct	No	Yes	Yes	No
Indiana	None	None	No	No	Yes	No
Iowa	None	None	No	No	Yes	No
Kansas	None	None	No	No	Yes	No
Kentucky	None	None	No	Yes	Yes	No
Louisiana	None	None	No	No	Yes	No
Maine	Indirect	None	Yes	Yes	Yes	No
Maryland	None	None	Yes	Yes	Yes	No
Massachusetts	Indirect	Indirect	Yes	Yes	Yes	No
Michigan	Indirect	Direct	Yes	Yes	Yes	No
Minnesota	None	None	No	No	Yes	No
Mississippi	None	Obsolete**	No	No	Yes	No
Missouri	Direct	Direct	Yes	Yes	Yes	No
Montana	Direct	Direct	Yes	Yes	Yes	No
Nebraska	Direct	Direct	Yes	Yes	Yes	No
Nevada	Indirect	Direct	Yes	Yes	Yes	Yes
New Hampshire	None	None	No	No	Yes	No
New Jersey	None	None	No	No	Yes	No
New Mexico	None	None	Yes	Yes	Yes	No
New York	None	None	No	No	Yes	No
North Carolina	None	None	No	No	Yes	No
North Dakota	Direct	Direct	Yes	Yes	Yes	No
Ohio	Indirect	Direct	Yes	Yes	Yes	No
Oklahoma	Direct	Direct	Yes	Yes	Yes	No
Oregon	Direct	Direct	Yes	Yes	Yes	No
Pennsylvania	None	None	No	No	Yes	No
Rhode Island	None	None	No	No	Yes	No
South Carolina	None	None	No	No	Yes	No
South Dakota	Direct	Direct	Yes	Yes	Yes	No
Tennessee	None	None	No	No	Yes	No
Texas	None	None	No	No	Yes	No
Utah	Both	None	Yes	Yes	Yes	No
Vermont	None	None	No	No	Yes	No
Virginia	None	None	No	No	Yes	No
Washington	Both	None	Yes	Yes	Yes	No
West Virginia	None	None	No	No	Yes	No
Wisconsin	None	None	No	No	Yes	No
Wyoming	Indirect	None	Yes	No	Yes	No

*The District of Columbia does not have a Constitution, however it does have a Charter which can be amended by Referral to the Ballot by the City Council followed by Congressional approval

**Citizen Initiated Amendments in Mississippi cannot qualify for the ballot so long as the state has four Congressional Districts due to a signature distribution provision requiring votes from five Congressional Districts

== Objections to the system ==
The initiative and referendums process have critics. Some argue that initiatives and referendums undermine representative government by circumventing the elected representatives of the people and allowing the people to directly make policy: they fear excessive majoritarianism (tyranny of the majority) as a result, believing that minority groups may be harmed.

Other criticisms are that competing initiatives with conflicting provisions can create legal difficulties when both pass; and that when the initiatives are proposed before the end of the legislative session, the legislature can make statutory changes that weaken the case for passing the initiative. Yet another criticism is that as the number of required signatures has risen in tandem with populations, "initiatives have moved away from empowering the average citizen" and toward becoming a tool for well-heeled special interests to advance their agendas. John Diaz wrote in an editorial for the San Francisco Chronicle in 2008:

There is no big secret to the formula for manipulating California's initiative process. Find a billionaire benefactor with the ideological motivation or crass self-interest to spend the $1-million plus to get something on the ballot with mercenary signature gatherers. Stretch as far as required to link it to the issue of the ages (this is for the children, Prop. 3) or the cause of the day (this is about energy independence and renewable resources, Props. 7 and 10). If it's a tough sell on the facts, give it a sympathetic face and name such as "Marsy's Law" (Prop. 9, victims' rights and parole) or "Sarah's Law" (Prop. 4, parental notification on abortion). Prepare to spend a bundle on soft-focus television advertising and hope voters don't notice the fine print or the independent analyses of good-government groups or newspaper editorial boards ... Today, the initiative process is no longer the antidote to special interests and the moneyed class; it is their vehicle of choice to attempt to get their way without having to endure the scrutiny and compromise of the legislative process.

In some cases, voters have passed initiatives that were subsequently repealed or drastically changed by the legislature. For instance, legislation passed by the voters as an Arizonan medical cannabis initiative was subsequently gutted by the Arizona legislature. To prevent such occurrences, initiatives are sometimes used to amend the state constitution and thus prevent the legislature from changing it without sending a referendum to the voters; however, this produces the problems of inflexibility mentioned above. Accordingly, some states are seeking a middle route. For example, Colorado's Referendum O would require a two-thirds vote for the legislature to change statutes passed by the voters through initiatives, until five years after such passage. This would allow the legislature to easily make uncontroversial changes.

An objection not so much to the initial concept but to its present implementations is that signature challenges are becoming a political tool, with state officials and opposing groups litigating the process, rather than simply taking the issue fight to voters. Signatures can be declared void based on technical omissions, and initiatives can be thrown out based on statistical samplings of signatures. Supporters lacking necessary funds to sustain legal battles can find their initiative taken off the ballot.

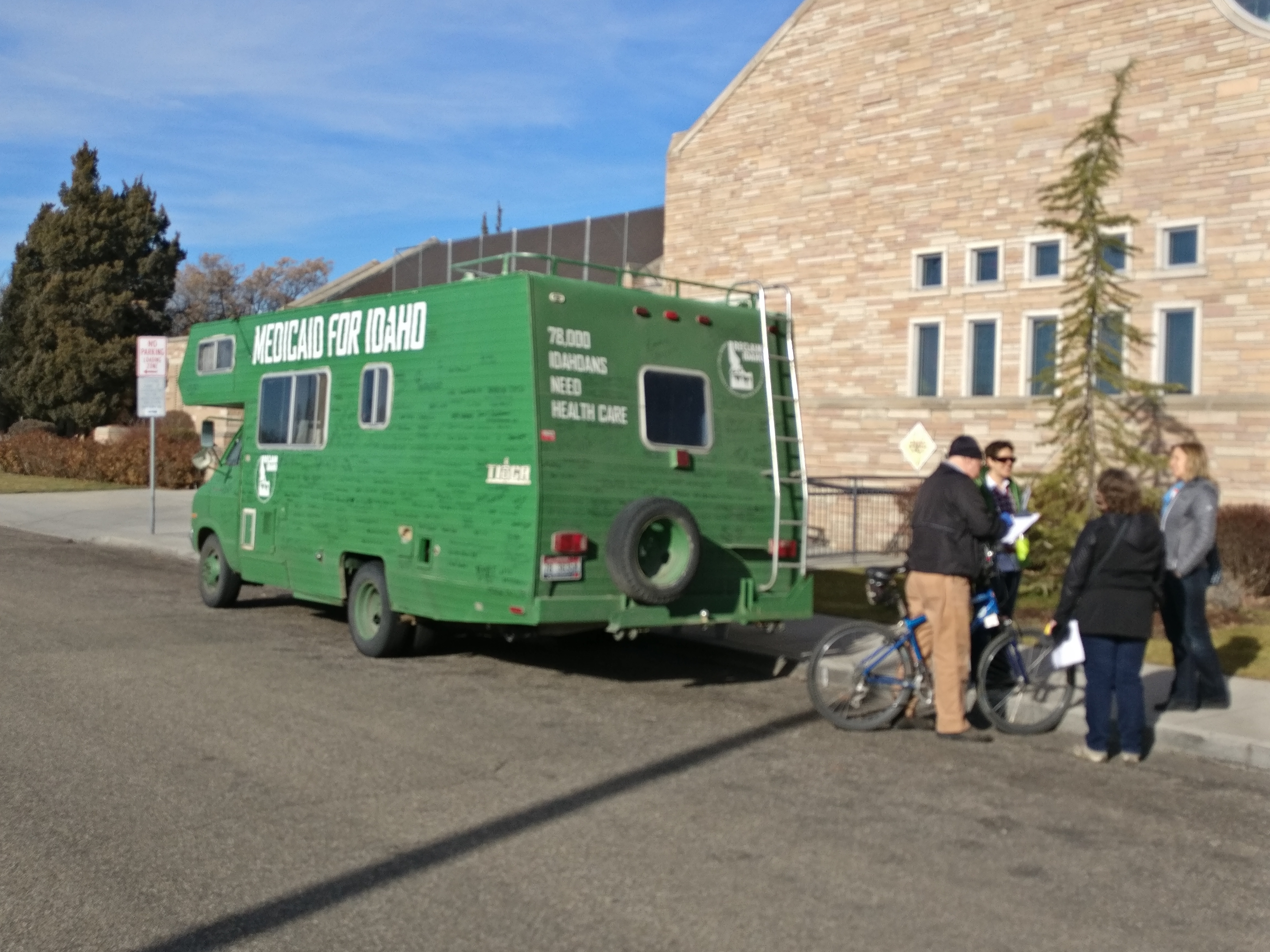
Medicaid for Idaho

Legislatures themselves may tighten already arduous requirements. E.g., while California or Oregon typically have dozens of ballot measures each year, Idaho has had 28 since the 1930s, of which twelve passed. The Idaho Legislature in 2013 however increased the geographical requirements for putting an initiative on the ballot after a trio of unpopular education laws ("Students Come First") were repealed by the voters. Despite the new requirement of the signatures of 6% of the registered voters in 18 of Idaho's 35 legislative districts before May, as of mid-April 2018 the drive to put the Medicaid gap before the voters on the November ballot (by way of their amending the state constitution, yea or nay) was well on its way to gathering the prerequisite number of signatures in the prerequisite number of legislative districts, much to the surprise of pundits. Ultimately the organizers had by the April 30 deadline delivered 60,000 signatures to county clerks' offices, which if verified are far more than the 56,192 required.

The New York Times reported in May 2021 that so far that year, Republicans had introduced 144 bills to restrict initiatives in 32 states, 19 of which had been signed into law by nine Republican governors. Although initiatives had historically been used by both parties, Democrats had been especially successful using the process in recent years in states where they do not control the state government. In three states, Republican legislators asked voters to approve initiatives that would restrict their right to bring and pass future initiatives.

== Proposed reforms ==
Some proposed reforms include paying signature gatherers by the hour, rather than by the signature (to reduce incentives for fraud) and increasing transparency by requiring major financial backers of initiatives to be disclosed to potential signatories. Other proposals include having a "cooling-off" period after an initiative qualifies, in which the legislature can make the initiative unnecessary by passing legislation acceptable to the initiative's sponsors. It has also been proposed that proxy voting be combined with initiative and referendum to form a hybrid of direct democracy and representative democracy.

=== Ludlow Amendment ===
The Ludlow Amendment was a proposed constitutional amendment drafted by Indiana congressman Louis Ludlow allowing for a referendum after a congressional declaration of war. It reached its peak public approval rating in the 1930s in an effort to maintain American isolationism in the years before the Second World War.

=== National initiative ===
The national initiative is a proposal to amend the United States Constitution to allow ballot initiatives at the federal level.

=== Citizens' Initiative Review ===
Healthy Democracy, and a similar organization in Washington State, proposed a Citizens' Initiative Review process. This brings together a representative cross-section of voters as a citizens' jury to question and hear from advocates and experts regarding a ballot measure; then deliberate and reflect together to come up with statements that support and/or oppose the measure. The state would organize such a review of each ballot measure, and include the panelists' statements in the voters' pamphlet. Since 2009, Healthy Democracy has led efforts to develop and refine the Citizens' Initiative Review process for use by Oregon voters. In 2011, the Oregon Legislature approved House Bill 2634, legislation making the Citizens' Initiative Review a permanent part of Oregon elections. This marked the first time a legislature has made voter deliberation a formalized part of the election process. The CIR is a benchmark in the initiative reform and public engagement fields. Each state has individual requirements to qualify initiatives for the ballot. Generally, all 24 states and the District of Columbia follow steps similar to:

1. File a proposed petition with a designated state official
2. State review of the proposal and, in several states, a review of the language of the proposal
3. Prepare ballot title and summary
4. Petition circulation to obtain the required number of signatures
5. Petition submitted to state election officials to verify the signatures and qualify the ballot entry

== See also ==
- Comparison of U.S. state and territory governments
- Elections in Puerto Rico
- Fairness Project
- Hollingsworth v. Perry
- Meyer v. Grant
