= Senator Salling =

Senator Salling may refer to:

- Johnny Ray Salling (born 1961), Maryland State Senate
- Lehua Fernandes Salling (born 1949), Hawaii State Senate
