= List of Hawaii ballot measures =

Since 1968, Hawaii has required a statewide vote for all constitutional amendments voted on by the legislature.

== Background ==
Hawaii has not historically had a statewide system for citizens to place initiatives on the ballot. In 1907, while it was still a territory, the Democratic Party of Hawaii passed a resolution supporting an initiative system, but when Hawaii became a state no system was included in the Constitution of Hawaii. At the 1968 Constitutional Convention, an initiative & referendum (I&R) system was proposed but was shot down by the committee after less than thirty minutes of deliberation. Efforts were revived during the 1978 Constitutional Convention, spearheaded by State Senator Mary George and the "Citizens Con Con Monitors." This effort was opposed by several workers unions, including the United Public Workers and the Hawaii Government Employees Association, who claimed that "initiative, referendum, and recall would be dominated by emotion rather than reason." While supporters of I&R were successful in bringing the proposal to a vote at the convention, it was ultimately rejected. Since that time, various other efforts have been undertaken by activists to limited success—while some counties and cities have adopted I&R, the state legislature has adopted an attitude described by the Initiative & Referendum Institute as "openly hostile."

== Types of ballot measures ==
The only form of ballot measure permitted in Hawaii are legislatively referred constitutional amendments, which are changes to the Constitution of Hawaii proposed by the Hawaiian Government. Article XVII of the Constitution of Hawaii provides for two means by which measures can be placed on the ballot:

- Measures can be placed on the ballot by the Hawaii State Legislature passing a constitutional amendment. Constitutional amendments will not go into effect until after approved by a vote of the people (Article XVII, Section 3).
- Measures can be placed on the ballot by a constitutional convention, which itself must be approved by a ballot measure placed by the legislature (Article XVII, Sections 1-2).

Constitutional amendments passed via ballot measures are unable to be vetoed by the Governor.

== 1968—1999 ==
=== 1968 ===
Measure name	Description	Status	Yes votes	No votes
Amendment 1	A constitutional amendment to adopt specific districts for the Hawaii House and Senate	Passed	149,200 (76.29%)	46,360 (23.71%)
Amendment 2	A constitutional amendment to establish a reapportionment commission to handle redistricting	Passed	152,962 (78.27%)	42,468 (21.73%)
Amendment 3	A constitutional amendment to ensure roughly equal representation in the state legislature across Hawaii	Passed	148,077 (75.73%)	47,451 (24.27%)
Amendment 4	A constitutional amendment to guarantee a right to privacy	Passed	151,603 (77.53%)	43,927 (22.47%)
Amendment 5	A constitutional amendment allowing state courts to not provide bail if a defendants release would cause danger to others	Passed	145,682 (74.50%)	49,860 (25.50%)
Amendment 6	A constitutional amendment to guarantee a right to effective counsel	Passed	152,113 (77.80%)	43,412 (22.20%)
Amendment 7	A constitutional amendment to ensure that land seized under eminent domain result in fair compensation for the land owners	Passed	152,815 (78.15%)	42,721 (21.85%)
Amendment 8	A constitutional amendment lowering the voting age to 18 years old	Failed	96,283 (49.24%)	99,257 (50.76%)
Amendment 9	A constitutional amendment restoring the right to vote to felons	Passed	128,703 (65.83%)	66,818 (34.17%)
Amendment 10	A constitutional amendment removing the requirement that citizens be fluent in either Hawaiian or English to vote	Passed	120,431 (61.59%)	75,106 (38.41%)
Amendment 11	A constitutional amendment authorizing the legislature to provide a presidential preference primary	Passed	147,254 (75.30%)	48,295 (24.70%)
Amendment 12	A constitutional amendment lowering the age limit to serve in the legislature	Passed	111,302 (56.92%)	84,244 (43.08%)
Amendment 13	A constitutional amendment making various changes to the state legislature process	Passed	148,634 (76.03%)	46,861 (23.97%)
Amendment 14	A constitutional amendment setting legislators' salaries at $12,000 a year	Passed	112,399 (57.48%)	83,138 (42.52%)
Amendment 15	A constitutional amendment modifying the structure and powers of the state executive	Passed	133,501 (68.28%)	62,016 (31.72%)
Amendment 16	A constitutional amendment modifying the structure and powers of the state court system	Passed	146,762 (75.06%)	48,762 (24.94%)
Amendment 17	A constitutional amendment modifying state and county debt limits	Passed	141,042 (72.14%)	54,467 (27.86%)
Amendment 18	A constitutional amendment requiring state budgets be passed on a biennial basis	Passed	149,109 (76.26%)	46,429 (23.74%)
Amendment 19	A constitutional amendment to allow for home rule in Hawaii counties	Passed	154,658 (79.10%)	40,857 (20.90%)
Amendment 20	A constitutional amendment allowing public employees to join unions	Passed	132,968 (67.96%)	62,692 (32.04%)
Amendment 21	A constitutional amendment to create a code of ethics for all public employees	Passed	153,949 (78.74%)	41,566 (21.26%)
Amendment 22	A constitutional amendment to allow for future constitutional conventions	Passed	153,599 (78.56%)	41,925 (21.44%)
Amendment 23	A constitutional amendment making various revisions to the Hawaii Constitution	Passed	153,967 (78.75%)	41,550 (21.25%)
Amendment 24	A constitutional amendment reapportioning the state legislature	Passed	111,911 (62.23%)	59,661 (37.77%)

=== 1970 ===
Measure name	Description	Status	Yes votes	No votes
Proposition 1	A constitutional amendment to modify the selection process for the Board of Education	Failed	70,587 (37.83%)	115,990 (62.17%)
Proposition 2	A constitutional amendment modifying the selection process for superintendents	Failed	76,711 (42.30%)	104,636 (57.70%)
Proposition 3	A constitutional amendment lowering the vote age to 18 years old	Failed	95,265 (49.16%)	98,502 (50.84%)
Proposition 4	A constitutional amendment requiring city charters undergo a review process every ten years	Passed	109,137 (66.82%)	54,205 (33.18%)

=== 1972 ===
Measure name	Description	Status	Yes votes	No votes
Amendment 1	A constitutional amendment to prohibit sex discrimination	Passed	207,123 (86.64%)	31,930 (13.36%)
Amendment 2	A constitutional amendment modifying the appropriations process	Passed	162,594 (74.98%)	54,246 (25.02%)
Amendment 3	A constitutional amendment lowering the voting age to 18 years old	Passed	174,118 (72.47%)	66,135 (27.53%)

=== 1974 ===
Measure name	Description	Status	Yes votes	No votes
Amendment 1	A constitutional amendment excluding some types of funding from the governor's veto ability	Failed	11,223 (47.80%)	12,257 (52.20%)

=== 1976 ===
Measure name	Description	Status	Yes votes	No votes
Amendment 1	A constitutional amendment to create standard minimum housing requirements across the state	Passed	200,787 (74.25%)	69,623 (25.75%)
Amendment 2	A constitutional amendment calling for a constitutional convention	Passed	199,831 (74.26%)	69,264 (25.74%)

=== 1978 ===
Measure name	Description	Status	Yes votes	No votes
Amendment 1	A constitutional amendment requiring twelve-member jurys and increasing the value of controversy to $1,000	Passed	168,910 (66.97%)	83,316 (33.03%)
Amendment 2	A constitutional amendment modifying the grand jury process	Passed	162,124 (64.28%)	90,102 (35.72%)
Amendment 3	A constitutional amendment affirming the right to privacy	Passed	131,244 (52.03%)	120,982 (47.97%)
Amendment 4	A constitutional amendment requiring the secrecy of voting	Passed	161,119 (63.88%)	91,107 (36.12%)
Amendment 5	A constitutional amendment requiring candidates for office to resign from any other political position they currently hold	Passed	148,542 (58.89%)	103,684 (41.11%)
Amendment 6	A constitutional amendment setting more restrictive campaign finance laws	Passed	145,910 (57.85%)	106,316 (42.15%)
Amendment 7	A constitutional amendment modifying the processes of the state legislature	Passed	159,907 (63.40%)	92,319 (36.60%)
Amendment 8	A constitutional amendment modifying the reapportionment timeline	Passed	169,136 (67.06%)	83,090 (32.94%)
Amendment 9	A constitutional amendment limiting the governor and lieutenant governor to two terms	Passed	171,518 (68.00%)	80,708 (32.00%)
Amendment 10	A constitutional amendment substantially overhauling the state court system	Passed	168,639 (66.86%)	83,587 (33.14%)
Amendment 11	A constitutional amendment clarifying state spending limits	Passed	168,508 (66.81%)	83,718 (33.19%)
Amendment 12	A constitutional amendment modifying the debt limit	Passed	178,358 (70.71%)	73,868 (29.29%)
Amendment 13	A constitutional amendment allowing the legislature more freedom in issuing bonds	Passed	163,709 (64.91%)	88,517 (35.09%)
Amendment 14	A constitutional amendment establishing a council on revenues at the state level	Passed	175,110 (69.43%)	77,116 (30.57%)
Amendment 15	A constitutional amendment allowing the legislature to establish a tax review commission	Passed	170,815 (67.72%)	81,411 (32.28%)
Amendment 16	A constitutional amendment transferring some taxation powers from the state to counties	Passed	130,963 (51.92%)	121,263 (48.08%)
Amendment 17	A constitutional amendment substantially overhauling state protections for the disabled and elderly	Passed	173,839 (68.92%)	78,387 (31.08%)
Amendment 18	A constitutional amendment requiring the state and counties to plan for population growth	Passed	167,450 (66.39%)	84,776 (33.61%)
Amendment 19	A constitutional amendment modifying the structure of the Board of Education	Passed	177,549 (70.39%)	74,677 (29.61%)
Amendment 20	A constitutional amendment prohibiting discrimination in public education and funding the creation of a Hawaiian Studies program for public schools	Passed	160,937 (63.81%)	91,289 (36.19%)
Amendment 21	A constitutional amendment modifying the power of the Hawaii University Board of Regents	Passed	175,201 (69.46%)	77,025 (30.54%)
Amendment 22	A constitutional amendment requiring the state to engage in more water resource protection	Passed	171,054 (67.82%)	81,172 (32.18%)
Amendment 23	A constitutional amendment requiring the state and counties to engage in more resource protection efforts	Passed	156,153 (61.91%)	96,073 (38.09%)
Amendment 24	A constitutional amendment requiring the state to engage in more conservation efforts	Passed	172,236 (68.29%)	79,990 (31.71%)
Amendment 25	A constitutional amendment tightening state control of marine resources	Passed	178,296 (70.69%)	73,930 (29.31%)
Amendment 26	A constitutional amendment prohibiting nuclear power plants unless approved by a supermajority vote in the legislature	Passed	164,366 (65.17%)	87,860 (34.83%)
Amendment 27	A constitutional amendment requiring the legislature to fund the Department of Hawaiian Home Lands	Passed	130,232 (51.18%)	121,994 (48.82%)
Amendment 28	A constitutional amendment creating the Office of Hawaiian Affairs	Passed	129,089 (51.18%)	123,137 (48.82%)
Amendment 29	A constitutional amendment explicitly protecting traditional rights held by the indigenous people of Hawaii	Passed	140,061 (92.01%)	12,165 (7.99%)
Amendment 30	A constitutional amendment clarifying that the code of ethics for public employees would also apply to constitutional convention delegates	Passed	179,961 (71.35%)	72,265 (28.65%)
Amendment 31	A constitutional amendment clarifying the state boundaries and motto	Passed	175,844 (69.72%)	76,382 (30.28%)
Amendment 32	A constitutional amendment preventing adverse possession	Passed	148,107 (58.72%)	104,119 (41.28%)
Amendment 33	A constitutional amendment making some miscellaneous revisions to the state constitution	Passed	178,632 (70.82%)	73,594 (29.18%)
Amendment 34	A constitutional amendment making various style changes to the state constitution	Passed	175,032 (69.39%)	77,194 (30.61%)

=== 1980 ===
Measure name	Description	Status	Yes votes	No votes
Amendment 1	A constitutional amendment requiring that future amendments receive 50% of the vote to pass	Passed	178,030 (67.55%)	85,530 (32.45%)
Amendment 2	A constitutional amendment requiring that future constitutional amendments be accompanied by voter education programs	Passed	187,093 (72.02%)	72,682 (27.98%)
Amendment 3	A constitutional amendment allowing the state senate to convene special sessions if necessary to fill judicial vacancies	Passed	153,868 (61.11%)	97,929 (38.89%)

=== 1982 ===
Measure name	Description	Status	Yes votes	No votes
Amendment 1	A constitutional amendment modifying the structure of criminal hearings	Passed	191,798 (66.83%)	95,216 (33.17%)
Amendment 2	A constitutional amendment modifying the payment schedule for legislators	Passed	152,154 (54.68%)	126,110 (45.32%)

=== 1984 ===
Measure name	Description	Status	Yes votes	No votes
Amendment 1	A constitutional amendment eliminating the requirement that excess revenue be refunded to taxpayers	Failed	138,069 (46.01%)	162,042 (53.99%)
Amendment 2	A constitutional amendment extending the time between a bill's introduction and the vote	Passed	177,060 (60.48%)	115,704 (39.52%)
Amendment 3	A constitutional amendment modifying the payment schedule for legislators	Passed	185,231 (64.55%)	101,719 (35.45%)
Amendment 4	A constitutional amendment expanding opportunities for the legislature to go on recess	Passed	173,623 (62.18%)	105,591 (37.82%)

=== 1986 ===
Measure name	Description	Status	Yes votes	No votes
Amendment C	A constitutional amendment allowing the Supreme Court to appoint retired judges if necessary	Passed	197,386 (62.31%)	119,375 (37.69%)
Amendment D	A constitutional amendment calling for a constitutional convention	Failed	137,236 (44.10%)	173,977 (55.90%)

=== 1988 ===
Measure name	Description	Status	Yes votes	No votes
Amendment 1	A constitutional amendment allowing jury trials in some civil cases	Passed	212,235 (67.49%)	102,246 (32.51%)
Amendment 2	A constitutional amendment eliminating the one-year residency requirement for voting	Passed	170,026 (52.06%)	156,594 (47.94%)
Amendment 3	A constitutional amendment making it so that candidates unopposed in the primary did not have to participate in the general election	Passed	198,301 (64.63%)	108,515 (35.37%)
Amendment 4	A constitutional amendment requiring the state to assert its control over natural resources	Passed	251,822 (81.89%)	55,689 (18.11%)
Amendment 5	A constitutional amendment allowing those who turn 18 in the same year of an election to vote in that election	Passed	164,407 (51.20%)	156,681 (48.80%)
Amendment 6	A constitutional amendment creating a seat on the Board of Education for a high school student	Passed	212,174 (67.11%)	103,961 (32.89%)
Amendment 7	A constitutional amendment modifying the units used to ensure equal representation in the state legislature	Passed	165,896 (55.66%)	132,133 (44.34%)

=== 1990 ===
Measure name	Description	Status	Yes votes	No votes
Amendment 1	A constitutional amendment changing the legislative recess minimum from five days to six days	Failed	144,552 (48.98%)	150,559 (51.02%)
Amendment 2	A constitutional amendment increasing the years of service qualification to be a district court judge from five years to ten years	Failed	151,502 (49.32%)	155,676 (50.68%)
Amendment 3	A constitutional amendment modifying the units used to ensure equal representation in the state legislature	Failed	142,688 (48.04%)	154,339 (51.96%)
Amendment 4	A constitutional amendment modifying the units used to ensure equal representation in the state legislature	Passed	149,474 (53.71%)	128,835 (46.29%)
Amendment 5	A constitutional amendment modifying the units used to ensure equal representation in the state legislature	Passed	151,740 (54.83%)	125,015 (45.17%)

=== 1992 ===
Measure name	Description	Status	Yes votes	No votes
Question 1	A constitutional amendment modifying the redistricting calendar	Passed	192,432 (50.40%)	127,199 (33.30%)
Question 2	A constitutional amendment providing an alternative oath of office for elected officials	Passed	228,395 (59.80%)	51,451 (13.50%)
Question 3	A constitutional amendment modifying the State Senate	Passed	217,462 (56.90%)	105,333 (27.60%)
Question 4	A constitutional amendment modifying the reapportionment system	Passed	210,400 (55.10%)	120,029 (31.40%)

=== 1994 ===
Measure name	Description	Status	Yes votes	No votes
Measure 1	A constitutional amendment authorizing the state to issue bonds in some circumstances	Passed	231,859 (61.60%)	102,721 (27.30%)
Measure 2	A constitutional amendment authorizing the state to issue bonds in some circumstances	Passed	198,977 (52.90%)	129,233 (34.30%)
Measure 3	A constitutional amendment making the Board of Education an appointed position by the Governor of Hawaii	Failed	158,675 (42.20%)	176,242 (46.80%)
Measure 4	A constitutional amendment limiting the powers of the Board of Education	Passed	238,870 (63.50%)	89,466 (23.80%)
Measure 5	A constitutional amendment modifying the Chief Justice of the Supreme Court's power	Passed	250,481 (66.60%)	71,160 (18.90%)
Measure 6	A constitutional amendment setting the number of judicial nominees to be no less than 4 and no more than 6	Passed	215,471 (57.30%)	96,762 (25.70%)
Measure 7	A constitutional amendment setting judge's term limits at 6 years	Passed	240,411 (63.90%)	73,945 (19.60%)
Measure 8	A constitutional amendment modifying the appointment process	Passed	205,982 (54.70%)	103,135 (27.40%)

=== 1996 ===
Measure name	Description	Status	Yes votes	No votes
Amendment 1	A constitutional amendment authorizing the state to issue bonds for the purpose of funding hurricane insurance	Passed	234,436 (63.50%)	92,238 (25.00%)
Amendment 2	A constitutional amendment allowing the state to apportion funds for the purpose of constructing new public school facilities	Passed	242,009 (65.50%)	83,882 (22.70%)
Amendment 3	A constitutional amendment making some changes to public school funding	Passed	164,132 (44.40%)	123,021 (33.30%)
Constitutional Convention	A constitutional amendment calling for a constitutional convention	Passed (Note: While this measure passed, enough voters left the question blank that court cases were filed challenging the result. To rectify this, the legislature placed the measure on the ballot again in 1998.)	163,869 (50.50%)	160,153 (49.50%)

=== 1998 ===
Measure name	Description	Status	Yes votes	No votes
Convention Question	A constitutional amendment calling for a constitutional convention	Failed	140,688 (34.10%)	244,753 (59.30%)
Question 1	A constitutional amendment modifying the tax review commission	Failed	138,672 (33.60%)	222,433 (53.90%)
Question 2	A constitutional amendment granting the legislature the authority to prohibit same-sex marriage	Passed	285,384 (69.18%)	117,827 (28.56%)

== 2000— ==
=== 2000 ===
Measure name	Description	Status	Yes votes	No votes
Amendment 1	A constitutional amendment granting the University of Hawaii self-governance	Passed	268,166 (72.40%)	76,870 (20.70%)
Amendment 2	A constitutional amendment requiring the tax review commission meet every ten years rather than every five years	Failed	130,055 (35.10%)	208,035 (56.10%)
Amendment 3	A constitutional amendment redefining the duties of the reapportionment commission	Passed	260,669 (70.40%)	67,568 (18.20%)

=== 2002 ===
Measure name	Description	Status	Yes votes	No votes
Question 1	A constitutional amendment requiring candidates for the state legislature hold residency in Hawaii before filing to run for office	Passed	42,506 (84.40%)	4,604 (9.10%)
Question 2	A constitutional amendment allowing the state to issue bonds for the purpose of assisting non-profit private educational institutions	Passed	28,379 (56.30%)	18,243 (36.20%)
Question 3	A constitutional amendment allowing the state to initiative felony prosecutions by submitting written documentation to the court	Passed	25,838 (51.30%)	19,277 (38.30%)

=== 2004 ===
Measure name	Description	Status	Yes votes	No votes
Amendment 1	A constitutional amendment to allow the legislature to define sexual assault crimes in law	Passed	282,852 (65.60%)	103,745 (24.10%)
Amendment 2	A constitutional amendment creating a public sex offender registry	Passed	309,415 (71.80%)	79,321 (18.40%)
Amendment 3	A constitutional amendment allowing the legislature to define confidential communications in criminal proceedings	Passed	229,439 (53.20%)	147,257 (34.20%)
Amendment 4	A constitutional amendment changing the process for the state to initiate criminal proceedings	Passed	241,658 (56.00%)	129,103 (29.90%)

=== 2006 ===
Measure name	Description	Status	Yes votes	No votes
Amendment 1	A constitutional amendment to establish a candidate advisory council to screen potential members of the University of Hawaii's board of regents	Passed	195,909 (56.20%)	152,635 (43.80%)
Amendment 2	A constitutional amendment to establish a government salary commission	Passed	184,101 (52.80%)	164,515 (47.20%)
Amendment 3	A constitutional amendment to remove the mandatory retirement age for judges	Failed	121,418 (34.80%)	226,805 (65.20%)
Amendment 4	A constitutional amendment allowing the Hawaii State Legislature to define some terms relating to sexual assault crimes	Passed	240,789 (69.00%)	107,575 (31.00%)
Amendment 5	A constitutional amendment allowing the state to issue bonds for the purpose of assisting agricultural businesses	Passed	222,072 (63.70%)	126,588 (36.30%)

=== 2008 ===
Measure name	Description	Status	Yes votes	No votes
Constitutional Convention Question	A measure to hold a state constitutional convention to revise the Constitution of Hawaii	Failed	152,453 (35.00%)	281,418 (65.00%)
SB 966	A constitutional amendment lowering the age requirement for Hawaii Governor and Lieutenant Governor from 30 to 25	Failed	75,696 (18.00%)	356,682 (82.00%)

=== 2010 ===
Measure name	Description	Status	Yes votes	No votes
HB 2376	A constitutional amendment changing the Hawaii Board of Education from an elected board to an appointed board	Passed	221,390 (57.40%)	145,818 (37.80%)
SB 2807	A constitutional amendment allowing the legislature to issue rebates if the state holds a budget surplus	Passed	227,457 (59.00%)	122,672 (31.80%)

=== 2012 ===
Measure name	Description	Status	Yes votes	No votes
HB 2594	A constitutional amendment allowing the state to issue bonds for the purpose of updating dam and reservoir facilities	Failed (Note: Required at least 218,833 votes to pass)	212,395 (48.70%)	175,952 (40.30%)
SB 650	A constitutional amendment allowing the Chief Justice of the Hawaii Supreme Court to temporarily appoint retired judges to judicial seats	Failed (Note: Required at least 218,833 votes to pass)	216,655 (49.60%)	174,190 (39.90%)

=== 2014 ===
Measure name	Description	Status	Yes votes	No votes
Amendment 1	A constitutional amendment requiring the judicial selection commission publicly disclose a list of judicial nominees for all vacancies	Passed	302,953 (81.98%)	41,308 (11.18%)
Amendment 2	A constitutional amendment allowing the legislature to issue bonds for the purpose of supporting agricultural businesses	Passed	185,531 (50.20%)	152,222 (41.19%)
Amendment 3	A constitutional amendment increasing judge's mandatory retirement age from 70 to 80	Failed	81,406 (22.03%)	268,958 (72.78%)
Amendment 4	A constitutional amendment allowing the state to spend public funds on private education programs	Failed	160,238 (43.36%)	192,247 (52.02%)
Amendment 5	A constitutional amendment allowing the legislature to issue bonds for the purpose of supporting dam and reservoir facilities	Passed	234,016 (63.32%)	106,377 (28.79%)

=== 2016 ===
Measure name	Description	Status	Yes votes	No votes
Amendment 1	A constitutional amendment to increase the value requirement for a jury trial in civil lawsuits from $5,000 to $10,000	Failed (Note: Required at least 218,833 votes to pass)	201,198 (46.00%)	185,586 (42.40%)
Amendment 2	A constitutional amendment adding bond and pension payments as alternative dispositions of excess general fund revenues	Passed	219,056 (50.10%)	157,289 (35.90%)

=== 2018 ===
Measure name	Description	Status	Yes votes	No votes
Hawaii Constitutional Convention Question	A measure to hold a state constitutional convention to revise the Constitution of Hawaii	Failed	94,579 (25.57%)	275,300 (74.43%)

=== 2024 ===
Measure name	Description	Status	Yes votes	No votes
Amendment 1	A constitutional amendment removing the state legislature's power to ban same-sex marriage.	Passed	268,038 (51.3%)	211,142 (40.4%)
Amendment 2	A constitutional amendment standardizing the judicial appointment process for district courts.	Passed	316,468 (60.6%)	131,729 (25.2%)

== See also ==
- Elections in Hawaii
- Initiatives and referendums in the United States
