= Charlene Hoe =

Founder of Hakipuʻu Learning Center and activist

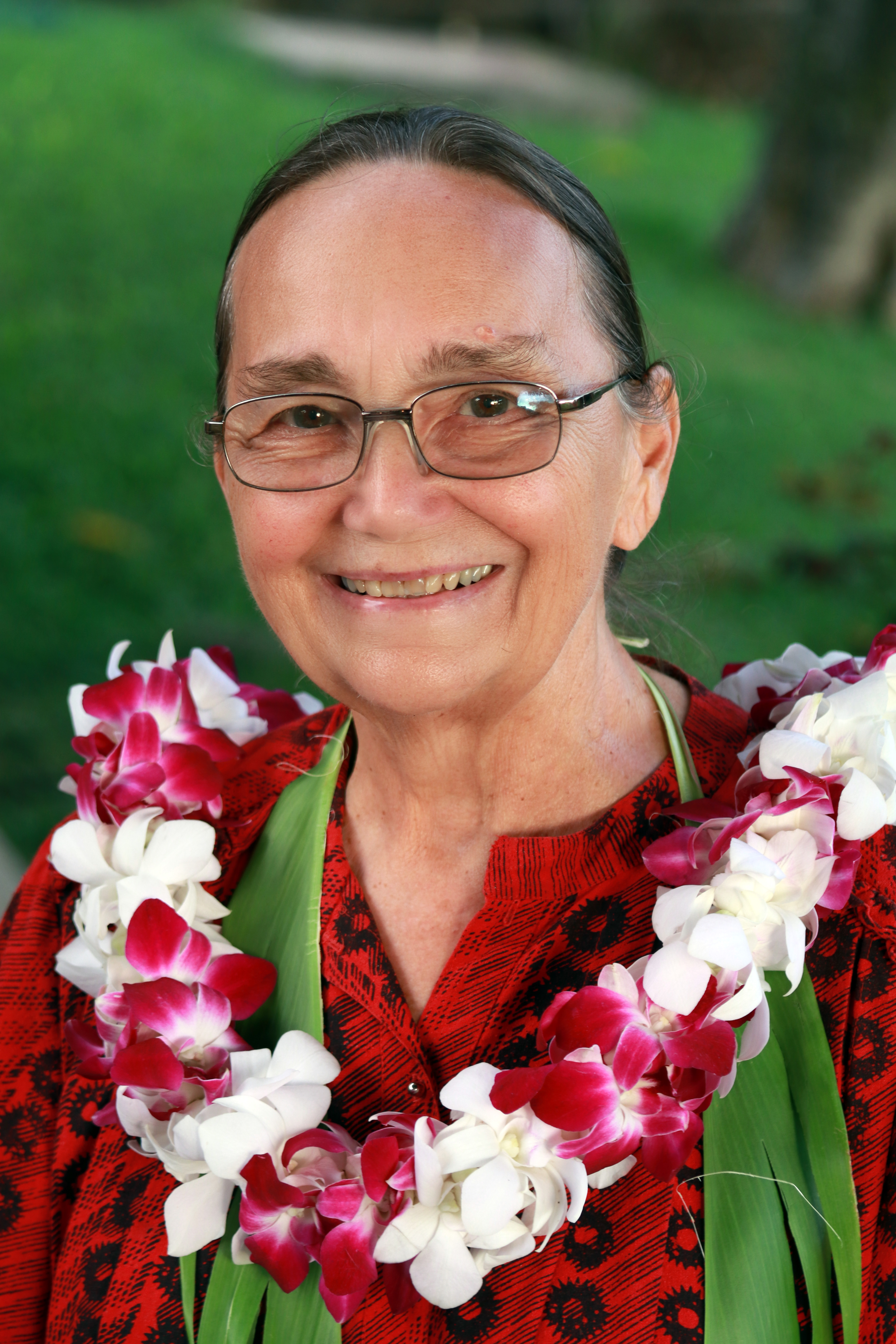
- Alma mater: Macalester College
- Occupation: Factory owner, primary school teacher, restaurant owner, academic administrator, activist
- Employer: Kamehameha Schools
- Spouse(s): Calvin Hoe
- Position held: delegate (1978–), volunteer (1968–1970)

Charlene Hoe (born circa 1947) is an American educator, activist, and founder of Hakipuʻu Learning Center, a delegate for the historic 1978 Hawaii State Constitutional Convention.

Hoe was born in Minnesota. She graduated from Macalester College, where she met her husband, Calvin Hoe. In 1968, Calvin and Charlene got married in Minnesota. After getting married, Charlene and Calvin volunteered with the Peace Corps to taught English as a second language in Micronesia. In 1970 Charlene and Calvin returned to Hawaii and Charlene gave birth to their first son Kala. Charlene would go onto have two other children, Liko and Kawai.

In the 1970s, Hoe participated in the Waiāhole-Waikāne struggle. In 1971, Charlene and Calvin bought the Waiahole Poi Factory and continued to serve food while also using the space as a gallery for native Hawaiians artists. In 1978, Hoe was a delegate for the historic Hawaii State Constitutional Convention that worked toward getting native Hawaiians more political power over Hawaiian affairs from the U.S. Federal Government.

In 2001, Hoe, in collaboration with Judy Layfield, oversaw the Strategic Planning Enhancement Group (SPEG) in the Kamehameha Schools that sought to find and analyze the potential ways that Kamehameha Schools could expand and/or improve its educational efforts among Native Hawaiians. Also in 2001, Charlene founded the Hakipuʻu Learning Center charter school that focuses on hands-on learning and prioritizing Hawaiian culture. Aside from being the founder, Hoe was also Hakipuʻu Learning Center's resource specialist and administrator.

Charlene Hoe is also featured in the 2022 anthology We Are Here: 30 Inspiring Asian Americans and Pacific Islanders Who Have Shaped the United States by Naomi Hirahara and published by the Smithsonian Institution and Running Press Kids.
