= List of Wyoming ballot measures =

The U.S. state of Wyoming has had a system of direct voting since 1968, when voters adopted a constitutional amendment allowing measures to be placed on the ballot. Only years when ballot measures were on the general election ballot are listed.

== Background ==
Wyoming's ballot measure procedure has been described by the Initiative & Referendum Institute as "one of the most onerous" in the nation. In order to place a citizen-initiated initiative on the ballot, measure sponsors must gather signatures equal to 15% of ballots cast in the previous election, along with at least 15% of voters in two-thirds of Wyoming counties. These requirements, coupled with the legislature's ability to remove ballot measures if they adopt a substantially similar law, make placing measures on the ballot exceptionally difficult. As a result, most measures voted on in the general election are placed on the ballot by the legislature, not the voters.

There are three types of ballot measures in Wyoming:

- Initiated state statues are measures that would create new state law. They are sponsored by voters and placed on the ballot after meeting signature requirements.
- Legislatively-referred constitutional amendments are changes to the Wyoming Constitution and are automatically placed on the ballot after approval by the legislature.
- Veto referendums are measures to repeal state law. They are sponsored by voters and placed on the ballot after meeting signature requirements.

== 1968–1999 ==
=== 1968 ===
Measure Name	Description	Status	Yes Votes	No Votes
Amendment No. 1	A constitutional amendment to repeal the school poll tax	Passed	73,872 (69.47%)	32,457 (30.53%)
Amendment No. 2	A constitutional amendment to create an initiative & referendum system in Wyoming, provided such measures receive at least 100 signatures in support	Passed	72,009 (74.77%)	24,299 (25.23%)

=== 1970 ===
Measure Name	Description	Status	Yes Votes	No Votes
Amendment 1	A constitutional amendment relating to public funds	Passed	75,996 (78.63%)	20,648 (21.37%)
Amendment 2	A constitutional amendment lowering the voting age to 19	Failed (Note: Required at least 61,178 votes to pass)	53,997 (52.72%)	48,418 (47.28%)
Amendment 3	A constitutional amendment allowing the state to invest education funds	Passed	64,970 (62.29%)	30,170 (31.71%)
Amendment 4	A constitutional amendment relating to the salaries of public officials	Failed (Note: Required at least 61,178 votes to pass)	56,940 (60.01%)	37,940 (39.99%)
Amendment 5	A constitutional amendment relating to the investment of county school funds	Passed	63,554 (67.52%)	30,570 (32.48%)

=== 1972 ===
Measure Name	Description	Status	Yes Votes	No Votes
Amendment 1	A constitutional amendment providing a form of home rule for cities and towns	Passed	97,026 (76.18%)	30,339 (23.82%)
Amendment 3	A constitutional amendment permitting state legislators to accept appointments to other offices	Failed (Note: Required at least 75,771 total votes to pass)	72,798 (56.71%)	55,580 (43.29%)
Amendment 4	A constitutional amendment authorizing the legislature to increase the number of justices on the Wyoming Supreme Court	Passed	86,539 (66.97%)	42,676 (33.03%)
Amendment 5	A constitutional amendment stating that the legislature should meet for no more than 60 working days per period	Passed	76,170 (60.27%)	50,209 (39.73%)
Amendment 6	A constitutional amendment allowing counties to levy an annual tax	Failed	51,895 (40.69%)	75,630 (59.31%)
Amendment 7	A constitutional amendment allowing counties to create indebtedness	Failed	63,239 (49.97%)	63,315 (50.03%)

=== 1974 ===
Measure Name	Description	Status	Yes Votes	No Votes
Amendment 1	A constitutional amendment creating new protections against double taxation	Unclear (Note: Total election returns were unable to be located for this year, so it is unclear whether this measure received the requisite votes to pass)	77,513 (68.42%)	35,771 (31.58%)
Amendment 2	A constitutional amendment creating a mineral excise tax	Unclear (Note: Total election returns were unable to be located for this year, so it is unclear whether this measure received the requisite votes to pass)	78,842 (70.87%)	32,414 (29.13%)
Amendment 3	A constitutional amendment establishing a statewide school levy	Failed	51,392 (45.06%)	62,667 (54.94%)

=== 1976 ===
Measure Name	Description	Status	Yes Votes	No Votes
Amendment 1	A constitutional amendment relating to judges	Passed	92,559 (66.48%)	46,664 (33.52%)
Amendment 2	A constitutional amendment increasing the city, county, and school indebtedness limit	Failed	43,951 (31.29%)	96,526 (68.71%)
Amendment 3	A constitutional amendment relating to the Wyoming criminal code	Passed	106,931 (77.50%)	31,045 (22.50%)

=== 1978 ===
Measure Name	Description	Status	Yes Votes	No Votes
Amendment 1	A constitutional amendment permitting women to work in mines	Passed	82,957 (66.11%)	44,446 (34.89%)
Amendment 2	A constitutional amendment equalizing school funding across all districts	Passed	83,552 (66.24%)	42,586 (33.76%)
Amendment 3	A constitutional amendment permitting the construction of a state prison for men and a state prison for women	Passed	82,537 (65.00%)	44,445 (35.00%)

=== 1980 ===
Measure Name	Description	Status	Yes Votes	No Votes
Amendment 1	A constitutional amendment providing for juries of less than twelve members in misdemeanor trials	Failed	44,446 (19.71%)	181,004 (80.29%)

=== 1982 ===
Measure Name	Description	Status	Yes Votes	No Votes
Amendment 1	A constitutional amendment permitting the legislature to invest state funds	Failed (Note: Required at least 86,033 votes to pass)	77,005 (50.81%)	74,548 (49.19%)
Amendment 2	A constitutional amendment increase state education taxes	Passed	100,820 (65.80%)	52,409 (34.20%)
Amendment 3	A constitutional amendment allowing the state treasurer to seek re-election	Passed	126,985 (82.58%)	26,788 (17.42%)

=== 1984 ===
Measure Name	Description	Status	Yes Votes	No Votes
Amendment 1	A constitutional amendment allowing the legislature to write off uncollected debts in certain circumstances	Passed	119,757 (67.98%)	56,402 (32.02%)
Amendment 2	A constitutional amendment allowing the investment of employee retirement funds	Passed	116,791 (66.20%)	59,637 (33.80%)
Amendment 3	A constitutional amendment clarifying that officials appointed by the governor can be removed by the governor	Failed (Note: Required at least 98,078 votes to pass)	87,920 (50.31%)	86,829 (49.69%)

=== 1986 ===
Measure Name	Description	Status	Yes Votes	No Votes
Amendment 1	A constitutional amendment modifying the pass requirements for ballot measures in Wyoming	Passed	104,759 (72.19%)	40,357 (27.81%)
Amendment 2	A constitutional amendment allowing the governor to remove state officials appointed by the same governor	Passed	128,476 (84.07%)	24,348 (15.93%)
Amendment 3	A constitutional amendment allowing the legislature to modify the duties of the state board of equalization	Passed	107,507 (73.86%)	38,050 (26.14%)
Amendment 4	A constitutional amendment allowing the legislature to create a state investment fund for economic development loans	Passed	111,590 (72.93%)	41,420 (27.07%)
Amendment 5	A constitutional amendment providing that any increase in judicial salaries apply to all judges	Failed (Note: Required at least 84,327 votes to pass)	79,557 (52.98%)	70,602 (47.02%)
Amendment 6	A constitutional amendment authorizing the legislature to expand workers compensation	Passed	106,591 (71.57%)	42,339 (28.43%)

=== 1988 ===
Measure Name	Description	Status	Yes Votes	No Votes
Amendment 1	A constitutional amendment allowing the legislature to create three classes of property for the purposes of taxation	Passed	133,677 (77.15%)	39,597 (22.85%)

=== 1990 ===
Measure Name	Description	Status	Yes Votes	No Votes
Amendment 1	A constitutional amendment to prevent sheriffs from keeping fees collected in civil cases	Passed	124,789 (81.11%)	29,054 (18.89%)
Amendment 2	A constitutional amendment to allow the legislature to appoint a state examiner, geologist, and inspector of mines	Passed	82,233 (55.73%)	65,317 (44.27%)
Amendment 3	A constitutional amendment transferring the powers of the Wyoming state board of charities to the legislature	Passed	86,195 (59.88%)	57,763 (40.12%)
Amendment 4	A constitutional amendment restricting the use of public employee retirement funds to purposes directly benefiting public employees	Passed	112,213 (75.45%)	36,511 (24.55%)

=== 1992 ===
Measure Name	Description	Status	Yes Votes	No Votes
Constitutional Amendment 1	A constitutional amendment to allow the legislature to invest the state permanent fund in equities	Unclear (Note: Vote totals were unable to be located for this measure)	--	--
Initiative 1	An initiative to ban triple trailers in Wyoming	Passed	165,879 (83.83%)	31,997 (16.17%)
Initiative 2	An initiative to establish term limits for elected officials in Wyoming	Passed	150,113 (77.00%)	44,424 (23.00%)
Initiative 3	An initiative to increase railroad regulation	Passed	130,646 (71.28%)	52,835 (28.72%)

=== 1994 ===
Measure Name	Description	Status	Yes Votes	No Votes
Constitutional Amendment 1	A constitutional amendment to create a criminal sentence of life without parole and to limit the governor's parole power	Passed (Note: Vote totals were unable to be located for this measure)	--	--
Constitutional Amendment 2	A constitutional amendment to allow the legislature to invest up to 25% of the state's permanent fund in equities	Failed (Note: Vote totals were unable to be located for this measure)	--	--
Initiative 1	An initiative to prohibit abortions except in cases where pregnancy endangers the mother's life, rape, or incest	Failed	61,980 (31.09%)	137,379 (68.91%)
Initiative 2	An initiative to permit some forms of gambling at the county level subject to a vote of the people	Failed	75,547 (60.20%)	114,273 (39.80%)
Initiative 3	An initiative to allow the state treasurer to invest up to $500 million in financial institutions	Failed	78,978 (39.94%)	118,760 (60.06%)

=== 1996 ===
Measure Name	Description	Status	Yes Votes	No Votes
Constitutional Amendment A	A constitutional amendment relating to redistricting	Failed	91,081 (48.46%)	96,857 (51.54%)
Constitutional Amendment B	A constitutional amendment restoring voting rights to most mentally ill people	Passed	122,658 (65.46%)	64,722 (34.54%)
Constitutional Amendment C	A constitutional amendment allowing state funds to be invested in corporate stocks if the legislature dictates	Passed	126,587 (64.81%)	68,727 (35.19%)
Constitutional Amendment D	A constitutional amendment strengthening the Commission on Judicial Conduct and Ethics	Passed	177,513 (89.08%)	21,751 (10.92%)
Initiative No. 1	An initiative requiring candidates for office to indicate whether they support term limits on the ballot	Failed	105,093 (54.14%)	89,018 (45.86%)
Initiative No. 2	An initiative to repeal Senate Enrolled Act 4, which extended term limits for legislators	Failed	104,544 (53.70%)	90,138 (46.30%)

=== 1998 ===
Measure Name	Description	Status	Yes Votes	No Votes
Constitutional Amendment A	A constitutional amendment allowing the legislature to reapportion its membership as soon as census data is available	Passed	117,638 (74.95%)	39,321 (25.05%)
Constitutional Amendment B	A constitutional amendment modifying the requirements for citizen-initiated measures to be placed on the ballot	Passed	97,846 (61.76%)	60,582 (38.24%)
Constitutional Amendment C	A constitutional amendment mandating that funds allocated to Wyoming's Workers Compensation Fund only be used for specific purposes	Passed	143,920 (88.24%)	19,178 (11.76%)

== 2000–present ==
=== 2000 ===
Measure Name	Description	Status	Yes Votes	No Votes
Constitutional Amendment B	A constitutional amendment expanding the eligibility requirements for the Wyoming National Guard	Passed	125,841 (64.61%)	68,927 (35.39%)

=== 2002 ===
Measure Name	Description	Status	Yes Votes	No Votes
Constitutional Amendment A	A constitutional amendment allowing the legislature to convene special legislative sessions if a majority of members agree	Passed	112,438 (66.29%)	57,187 (33.71%)
Constitutional Amendment B	A constitutional amendment allowing the legislature to handle disputes relating to presidential electors	Passed	110,906 (65.78%)	57,708 (34.22%)
Constitutional Amendment C	A constitutional amendment limiting the governor's line-item veto authority only to general appropriations bills	Failed	73,240 (44.22%)	92,396 (55.78%)
Constitutional Amendment D	A constitutional amendment requiring constitutional amendments be submitted to the voters before being approved by the Governor	Failed	87,786 (52.74%)	78,679 (47.26%)

=== 2004 ===
Measure Name	Description	Status	Yes Votes	No Votes
Constitutional Amendment A	A constitutional amendment to allow school districts to bring in more revenue yearly	Failed	122,038 (55.78%)	96,762 (44.22%)
Constitutional Amendment B	A constitutional amendment allowing the legislature to authorize local governments to access expanded funding sources provided they receive vocal approval	Passed	148,808 (66.16%)	76,115 (33.84%)
Constitutional Amendment C	A constitutional amendment to allow the legislature to create laws requiring dispute resolution before medical malpractice lawsuits	Passed	124,178 (52.99%)	110,169 (47.01%)
Constitutional Amendment D	A constitutional amendment allowing the legislature to create laws limiting damages in medical malpractice lawsuits	Failed	115,981 (49.65%)	117,602 (50.35%)

=== 2006 ===
Measure Name	Description	Status	Yes Votes	No Votes
Constitutional Amendment A	A constitutional amendment clarifying that all money in the Permanent Wyoming Mineral Trust Fund are permanent funds of the state	Passed	130,735 (74.05%)	45,817 (25.95%)
Constitutional Amendment B	A constitutional amendment allowing a greater amount of money to be distributed throughout the state for the purpose of funding school districts	Passed	107,481 (58.15%)	77,338 (41.85%)
Constitutional Amendment C	A constitutional amendment creating a permanent fund for higher education scholarships and quality improvements	Passed	139,396 (75.05%)	46,342 (24.95%)

=== 2008 ===
Measure Name	Description	Status	Yes Votes	No Votes
Constitutional Amendment A	A constitutional amendment rewriting the oath of office required for public officials to take office	Passed	191,787 (81.75%)	42,821 (18.25%)
Constitutional Amendment B	A constitutional amendment modifying the requirements for citizen-led initiatives to be placed on the ballot	Failed	120,333 (54.21%)	101,655 (45.79%)

=== 2012 ===
Measure Name	Description	Status	Yes Votes	No Votes
Constitutional Amendment A	A constitutional amendment forbidding a mandatory health care system in Wyoming and allowing citizens to pay any health care provider for services	Passed	181,984 (76.98%)	54,405 (23.02%)
Constitutional Amendment B	A constitutional amendment establishing a citizen's right to hunt and fish	Passed	212,561 (89.26%)	25,564 (10.74%)
Constitutional Amendment C	A constitutional amendment expanding the authority of district court commissioners	Failed	88,562 (41.90%)	122,824 (58.10%)

=== 2014 ===
Measure Name	Description	Status	Yes Votes	No Votes
Constitutional Amendment A	A constitutional amendment allowing the Governor of Wyoming to appoint non-Wyoming citizens to the University of Wyoming board of trustees	Failed	47,979 (29.51%)	114,597 (70.49%)

=== 2016 ===
Measure Name	Description	Status	Yes Votes	No Votes
Constitutional Amendment A	A constitutional amendment allowing the legislature to authorize the investment of public money in equities	Passed	132,739 (56.29%)	103,071 (43.71%)

=== 2020 ===
Measure Name	Description	Status	Yes Votes	No Votes
Constitutional Amendment A	A constitutional amendment to allow municipalities to take on additional debt for sewer projects	Failed	126,589 (51.17%)	120,808 (48.83%)

=== 2022 ===
Measure Name	Description	Status	Yes Votes	No Votes
Constitutional Amendment A	A constitutional amendment to allow local governments such as counties and cities to invest public funds in equities	Passed	103,389 (56.78%)	78,714 (43.22%)
Constitutional Amendment B	A constitutional amendment to increase the retirement age for judges from 70 to 75	Failed	74,650 (39.19%)	115,838 (60.81%)

=== 2024 ===
Measure Name	Description	Status	Yes Votes	No Votes
Constitutional Amendment A	A constitutional amendment creating new property tax rates for residential properties and owner-occupied primary residences.	Passed	146,336 (59.31%)	100,392 (40.69%)

== See also ==
- Elections in Wyoming
