= Clarice Y. Hashimoto =

American politician

- Hashimoto in 1987

Member of the Hawaii House of Representatives
- In office 1985–1992
- Constituency: 42nd district

Member of the Hawaii House of Representatives
- In office 1983–1984
- Constituency: 32nd district

Member of the Hawaii House of Representatives
- In office 1979–1982 Serving with Donald Masutani Jr. (1979–1980); Eloise Yamashita Tungpalan (1981–1982)
- Constituency: 19th district

Personal details
- Born: 1953 or 1954 (age 71–72)
- Party: Democratic
- Spouse: Gary Omori
- Alma mater: University of Hawaiʻi
- Occupation: Social worker

Clarice Y. Hashimoto (born 1953 or 1954) is an American politician. She served in a variety of public-facing roles during her career, including as a delegate to the 1978 Hawaii State Constitutional Convention, as a Democratic member of the Hawaii House of Representatives from 1979 to 1992, and as a staff member at the Hawaii Department of Agriculture.

== Life and career ==
Hashimoto was born in 1953 or 1954 and raised in Pearl City, Hawaii. She studied sociology at the University of Hawaiʻi and, prior to entering politics, worked as a social worker. She served as a delegate to the 1978 Hawaii State Constitutional Convention.

Hashimoto is married to Gary Omori.

=== Hawaii House of Representatives (1979–1992) ===
Hashimoto served in the Hawaii House of Representatives from 1979 to 1992. Upon taking office, she stated that her priorities would be limiting welfare abuse and improving disability access in education. In 1979, she introduced a bill that would have created a state fund for renewable energy research. She later introduced a bill to create a renewable energy tax credit. In 1982, she introduced a bill with Richard Matsuura that would have required car seats for children under the age of 3. During the 1983–1984 legislative session, Hashimoto was chair of the Education committee. During the 1985–1986 session, she chaired the Housing committee.

=== Post-legislative career (1992–Present) ===
Hashimoto left the legislature in 1992 after being hired for a position with the Hawaii Department of Agriculture. Her hiring for a position focused on milk control was criticized by Gale Young, manager of the state's dairy farmer's association, who argued that she did not have sufficient dairy experience and that the position should have been advertised. Young was fired for his comments to the media. Hashimoto's appointment was initially justified as being for a one-year position, however, Hashimoto held the role until at least 1996. In 1995, Hashimoto was appointed to the Honoolulu Zoning Appeals Board. In 2001, Hashimoto formed a political action committee to elect Democrats.

Hashimoto later worked in the office of the Mayor of Honolulu. In 2011, Hashimoto was working for then-Speaker of the Hawaii House Calvin Say, who appointed her to serve on the state's reapportionment commission. Her appointment to the commission was criticized by some legislative Democrats to the Honolulu Civil Beat, who believed that Say was attempting to redraw district boundaries to be more favorable for him. This was pushed back on by the commission's chair Victoria Marks, who argued that the commission had nine members and a single member would not be capable of pushing an agenda.

== Elections ==
Hashimoto first ran for the Hawaii House of Representatives in 1978 for the 19th district. She won the primary and, with no Republican candidates running, automatically won the general election as well. She was one of five delegates to the constitutional convention to win election to the legislature in 1978. She was reelected in 1980.

In 1982, after Hawaii moved to single-member districts, she was elected to represent the 32nd district unopposed. In 1984, she was redistricted into the 42nd and won election there. She won reelection either unopposed or by wide margins in 1986, 1988, and 1990. In 1992, Hashimoto opted not to run for reelection.
