= Calvin Hoe =

Hawaiian artisan, musician, and activist

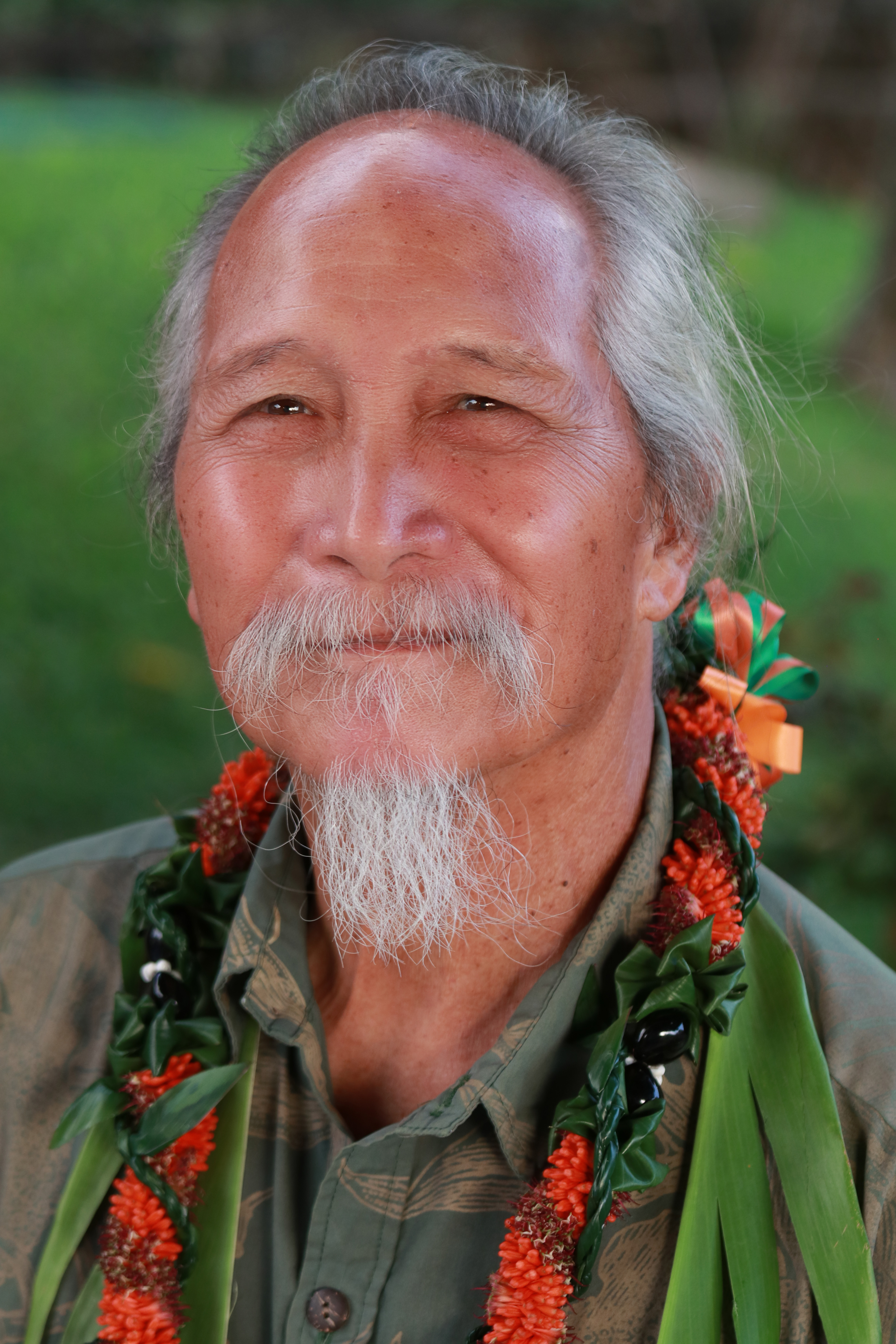
- Born: Oʻahu
- Occupation: Musician, manufacturer, restaurant manager, teacher
- Spouse(s): Charlene Hoe
- Position held: volunteer (1968–1970)

Calvin Hoe is a Hawaiian artisan, musician, restaurant owner, educator, and activist.

Hoe graduated from Macalester College, where he met his wife, Charlene Hoe. They got married in 1968 and then joined the Peace Corps to teach English as a second language in Micronesia. In 1970, Calvin and Charlene returned to Hawaii. Hoe had three children with Charline – Kala, Liko, and Kawai. From 1970 to 1972, Hoe taught at the Kamehameha Schools. While at the Kamehameha Schools, Hoe met renowned kumu hula Aunty Nona Beamer who was teaching Hawaiian cultural activities and taught Hoe how to make traditional Hawaiian instruments such as the nose flue, which he would later become famous for.

In 1971, Calvin and Charlene bought the Waiahole Poi Factory and continued to serve food while also using the space as a gallery for native Hawaiians artists.

During the 1970s, Hoe participated in the Waiāhole-Waikāne struggle. Land development projects such as the one involved in the Waiāhole-Waikāne struggle also impacted Hoe's mother's land that had been in his family for generations in Hakipuu. In 1980, Hoe, along with Chester Uyemura and George Fukumitsu, sued the Secretary of the Army Clifford Alexander and several other public officials regarding development plans for a beach in Kualoa Regional Park, claiming that they rely on subsistence fishing around the area and that the development project will significantly impair their ability to fish around the sandbar. They lost the lawsuit.

In 2001, Hoe worked at the Queen Lili'uokalani Children's Center. Also in 2001, Hoe and his wife opened the Hakipuʻu Learning Center charter school, which focuses on hands-on learning and prioritizing Hawaiian culture. In 2004, Hoe performed alongside David Montour and Fernando Cellicion at the Smithsonian Institution's First Americans Festival. Hoe hosted a workshop and performed at the 2007 Waikiki festival showcasing Hawaiian nose flute making, gourd whistles, and ti leaf whistles.

In 2018, Hoe performed and presented the 26th annual Celebration of the Arts at The Ritz-Carlton, Kapalua, where he taught attendees how to make Hawaiian instruments out of natural items like bamboo and seeds. In 2019, Hoe and his son Kala, contributed to the University of Hawaiʻi at Mānoa's production of Keiki Kalo, an interactive educational experience for young children hosted by the university's department of Theatre & Dance and the Kennedy Theatre. Starting in 2019, Hoe has been a part of the Thirty Meter Telescope protests.

Hoe is featured in Kenneth K. Martinez Burgmaier's 2022 documentary "Hawaiian Spiritual Guardians: ‘Aumakua.” He is also featured in the 2022 anthology We Are Here: 30 Inspiring Asian Americans and Pacific Islanders Who Have Shaped the United States by Naomi Hirahara and published by the Smithsonian Institution and Running Press Kids.

In 2026, Hoe was credited to playing the 'ohe hano ihu (Hawaiian nose flute) and chanting on black metal album Aia I Ka 'Ōpua Ke Ola by Hawaiian black metal band Kūka’ilimoku.
