= Gerald T. Hagino =

American politician

Member of the Hawaii House of Representatives
- In office 1981–1982

Member of the Hawaii Senate
- In office 1983–1994

Personal details
- Born: July 31, 1949
- Died: June 21, 2023 (aged 73)
- Party: Democratic

Gerald T. Hagino (July 31, 1949 – June 21, 2023) was an American politician. He served as a Democratic member of the Hawaii House of Representatives and the Hawaii Senate.

Hagino was a delegate to the 1978 Hawaii State Constitutional Convention, where he offered language that would be adopted as the preamble to the state constitution.
