= 1978 Hawaii State Constitutional Convention =

The 1978 Hawaii State Constitutional Convention is considered the watershed political event in the modern State of Hawaii. It was convened on July 5, 1978. The convention established term limits for state office holders, provided a requirement for an annual balanced budget, laid the groundwork for the return of federal land such as the island of Kahoʻolawe, and created the Office of Hawaiian Affairs in an effort to right the wrongs done towards native Hawaiians since the overthrow of the Kingdom of Hawaiʻi in 1893. The event also created an ambitious project of preservation of the Hawaiian culture including the adoption of Hawaiian diacritical marks for official usage, use of Hawaiian names, etc. The Hawaiian language became the official state language of Hawaii for the first time since the overthrow.

Based upon language the US Supreme Court had used to legalize abortion and birth control, the convention added the text: "the right of the people to privacy is recognized and shall not be infringed without the showing of a compelling state interest." This text makes the state constitution one of only five in the US that explicitly define a right to privacy.

== Political legacy ==
A major outgrowth of the constitutional convention was the launching of the political careers of those who would later dominate Hawaiian politics. Delegates to the convention included:

- Mark J. Andrews, future legislator
- Adelaide "Frenchy" DeSoto, future board chair of the Office of Hawaiian Affairs
- Carol Fukunaga, future legislative leader
- Gerald T. Hagino, future legislator
- Helene Hale, future legislative leader
- Thomas H. Hamilton, president of the University of Hawaii
- Jeremy Harris, future Mayor of Honolulu
- Clarice Y. Hashimoto, future legislator
- Charlene Hoe, founder of Hakipuʻu Learning Center
- Les Ihara, Jr., future legislative leader
- Barbara Marumoto, future legislative leader
- Tom Okamura, future legislative leader
- Bill Paty, future chair of the Board of Land and Natural Resources
- Lehua Fernandes Salling, future legislator
- Joseph M. Souki, future Speaker of the House
- Jim Shon, future legislator
- Anthony "Tony" Takitani, future legislator
- John David Waiheʻe III, future Governor
