= Initiative & Referendum Institute =

The Initiative & Referendum Institute, or I&R Institute, is a 501(c)(3) tax-exempt educational and research organization dedicated to the study of the I&R process. It is affiliated with the USC-Caltech Center for the Study of Law and Politics. Founded in 1998 by M. Dane Waters, the I&R Institute is dedicated to educating citizens about how the initiative and referendum process has been utilized and in providing information to citizens so they understand and know how to utilize the process.

The Institute was the first international source for non partisan information on the initiative and referendum process and became part of the University of Southern California in 2008 when John G. Matsusaka took over as president. Mr. Waters still serves as the Chair of the Institute.

== Scholarly work ==
The Initiative & Referendum Institute studies the initiative and referendum process and publishes papers and monographs addressing its effect on public policy, citizen participation and its reflection of trends in American thought and culture. Publications include a variety of books, conference papers and publications that enable a deeper understanding of the challenges and history of the I&R process.

The I&R Institute publishes Ballot Watch, which keeps readers abreast of developments in the world of ballot measures, and monographs on subjects such as its report on tobacco-related initiatives in 2006 and the spill-over impact of ballot initiatives into candidate races.

== Litigation ==
In 2000, the IRI took the U.S. Postal Service to the U.S. Court of appeals for the right to collect signatures on sidewalks in front of post office. In Initiative & Referendum Institute v U.S. Postal Service, the court found that sidewalks that were parallel to the street were public but that sidewalks leading into buildings could not be used for campaigning.

== See also ==
- Electoral reform in the United States
