= 2024 Hawaii Senate election =

- November 5, 2024

13 of the 25 seats in the Hawaii Senate 13 seats needed for a majority
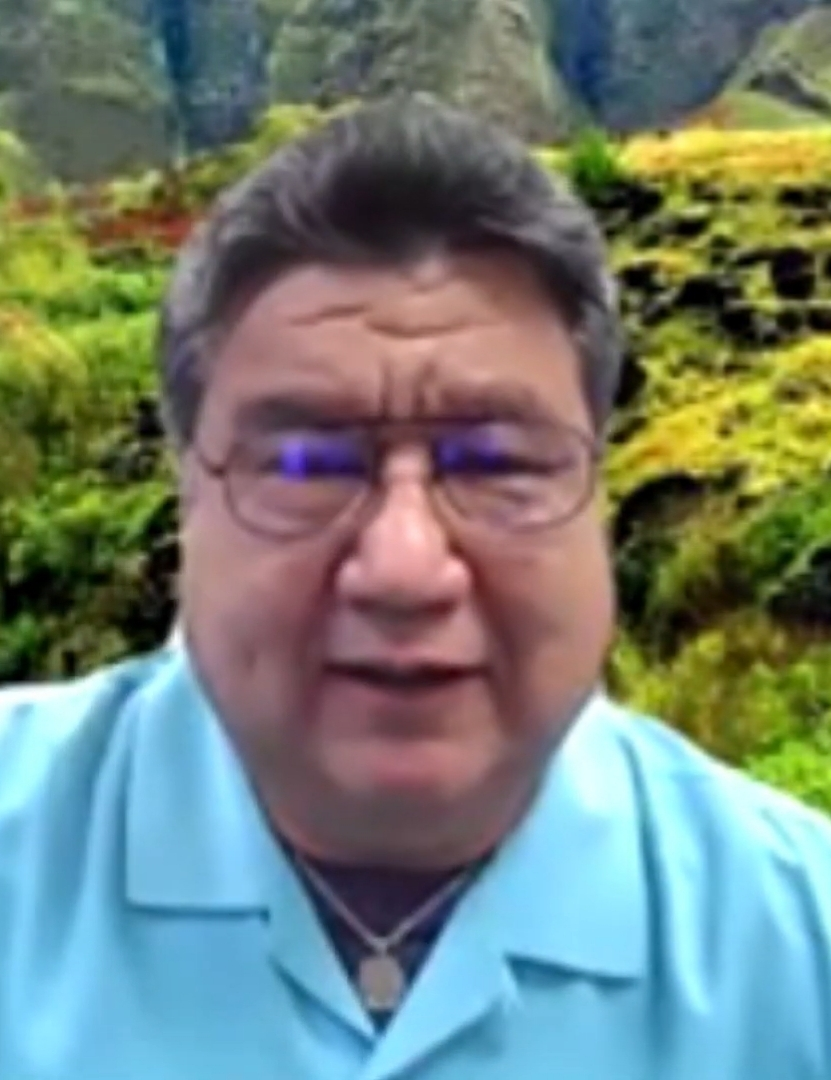

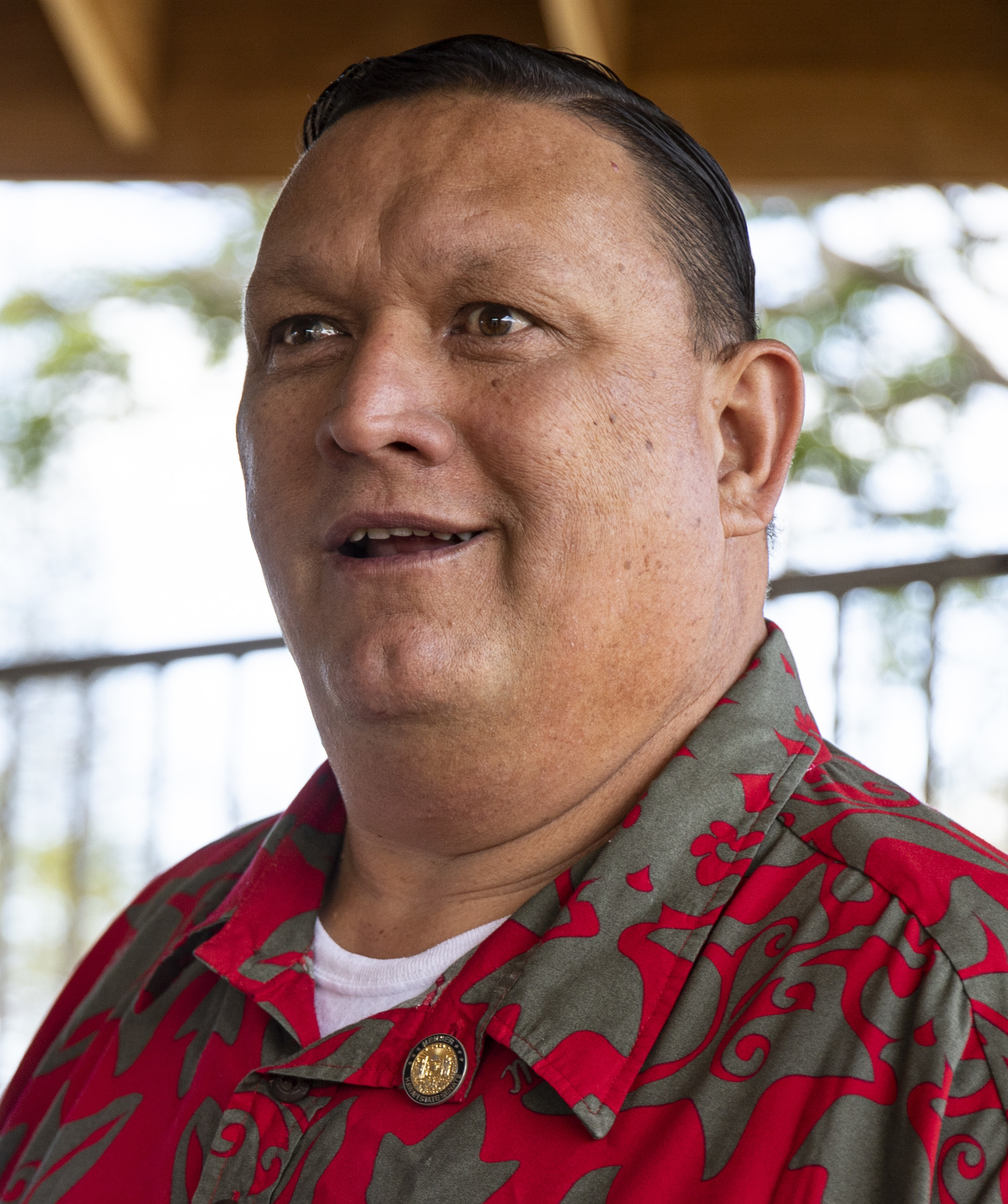
| | Majority party | Minority party |
|---|---|---|
| Leader | Ron Kouchi | Kurt Fevella |
| Party | Democratic | Republican |
| Leader's seat | 8th | 19th |
| Seats before | 23 | 2 |
| Seats after | 22 | 3 |
| Seat change | ▼1 | ▲1 |
| Popular vote | 98,701 | 54,832 |
| Percentage | 64.29% | 35.71% |
- Results: Republican gain Democratic hold Republican hold No election
President before election
Ron Kouchi
Democratic
Elected President
Ron Kouchi
Democratic

The 2024 Hawaii Senate election was held on November 5, 2024, as part of the 2024 United States elections. 12 of the 25 seats in the Hawaii Senate were elected.

== Background ==
Primary elections took place on August 10, 2024.

== Predictions ==
| Source | Ranking | As of |
|---|---|---|
| Sabato's Crystal Ball | Safe D | October 23, 2024 |

== Summary of results ==
=== By district ===
†: Incumbent not running for reelection. ‡: Special election.

| District | Incumbent | Party | Elected Senator | Party |
|---|---|---|---|---|
| 1st | Lorraine Inouye | Dem | Lorraine Inouye | Dem |
| 3rd | Dru Kanuha | Dem | Dru Kanuha | Dem |
| 4th | Tim Richards III | Dem | Tim Richards III | Dem |
| 5th‡ | Troy Hashimoto (Note: Appointed November 9, 2023, to fill the vacancy following Gilbert Keith-Agaran's resignation.) | Dem | Troy Hashimoto | Dem |
| 6th | Angus McKelvey | Dem | Angus McKelvey | Dem |
| 7th | Lynn DeCoite | Dem | Lynn DeCoite | Dem |
| 12th | Sharon Moriwaki | Dem | Sharon Moriwaki | Dem |
| 16th | Brandon Elefante | Dem | Brandon Elefante | Dem |
| 18th | Michelle Kidani | Dem | Michelle Kidani | Dem |
| 19th | Henry Aquino | Dem | Henry Aquino | Dem |
| 22nd | Cross Makani Crabbe† (Note: Appointed July 30, 2024, to fill the vacancy following Maile Shimabukuro's resignation) | Dem | Samantha DeCorte | Rep |
| 23rd | Brenton Awa | Rep | Brenton Awa | Rep |
| 24th | Jarrett Keohokalole | Dem | Jarrett Keohokalole | Dem |

=== Overall ===
Summary of the November 5, 2024 Hawaii House of Representatives election results
| Party | Candidates | Votes | | Seats | | |
| Party | Candidates | # | % | Seats | | |
| Party | Candidates | # | % | Before | Won | +/– |
|---|---|---|---|---|---|---|
| Democratic | 16 | 98,701 | 64.29% | 23 | 22 | ▼1 |
| Republican | 8 | 54,832 | 35.71% | 2 | 3 | ▲1 |
| Total valid votes | | 153,533 | 93.34% | | | |
| Blank votes | | 10,665 | 6.48% | | | |
| Overvotes | | 282 | 0.17% | | | |
| Total votes cast | | 164,480 | 100.0% | | | |
Source: State of Hawaii Office of Elections

=== Closest races ===
Seats where the margin of victory was under 10%:

1. District 23, 5.2%
2. District 22, 8.8% (gain)

== Retiring incumbents ==
=== Democrats ===
1. District 22: Cross Makani Crabbe, who was appointed to the seat, ran in the 2024 Hawaii House of Representatives election.

== Detailed results ==
General election results:

=== District 1 ===
==== Democratic primary ====
2024 Hawaii's 1st Senate district Democratic primary
| Party | Candidate | Votes | % |
|---|---|---|---|
| Democratic | Lorraine Inouye (incumbent) | | |
| Democratic | Laura Acasio | | |
| Total votes | | | 100.00 |

==== General election ====
The general election was cancelled because no opposition filed. Incumbent Democrat Lorraine Inouye re-elected.

=== District 3 ===
==== General election ====
2024 Hawaii's 3rd Senate district election
| Party | Candidate | Votes | % |
|---|---|---|---|
| Democratic | Dru Kanuha (incumbent) | 13,099 | 63.1 |
| Republican | Kurt Sullivan | 6,259 | 30.2 |
| | Blank votes | 1,384 | 6.7 |
| | Over votes | 15 | 0.1 |
| Total votes | | 20,757 | 100% |
| Democratic hold | | | |

=== District 4 ===
Primary and general election cancelled because no opposition filed. Incumbent Democrat Tim Richards III re-elected.

=== District 5 (special) ===
Primary and general election cancelled because no opposition filed. Appointed incumbent Democrat Troy Hashimoto elected to a full term.

=== District 6 ===
==== General election ====
2024 Hawaii's 6th Senate district election
| Party | Candidate | Votes | % |
|---|---|---|---|
| Democratic | Angus McKelvey (incumbent) | 11,473 | 57.3 |
| Republican | Sheila Walker | 6,864 | 34.3 |
| | Blank votes | 1,558 | 7.8 |
| | Over votes | 145 | 0.7 |
| Total votes | | 20,040 | 100% |
| Democratic hold | | | |

=== District 7 ===
==== General election ====
2024 Hawaii's 7th Senate district election
| Party | Candidate | Votes | % |
|---|---|---|---|
| Democratic | Lynn DeCoite (incumbent) | 15,833 | 66.5 |
| Republican | Gabby Macaraeg | 5,904 | 24.8 |
| | Blank votes | 2,041 | 8.6 |
| | Over votes | 37 | 0.2 |
| Total votes | | 23,815 | 100% |
| Democratic hold | | | |

=== District 12 ===
==== General election ====
2024 Hawaii's 12th Senate district election
| Party | Candidate | Votes | % |
|---|---|---|---|
| Democratic | Sharon Moriwaki (incumbent) | 12,758 | 64.6 |
| Republican | Shotaro Dabbs | 5,366 | 27.2 |
| | Blank votes | 1,591 | 8.1 |
| | Over votes | 24 | 0.1 |
| Total votes | | 19,739 | 100% |
| Democratic hold | | | |

=== District 16 ===
==== General election ====
2024 Hawaii's 16th Senate district election
| Party | Candidate | Votes | % |
|---|---|---|---|
| Democratic | Brandon Elefante (incumbent) | 16,425 | 69.6 |
| Republican | Patricia Beekman | 5,891 | 25.0 |
| | Blank votes | 1,259 | 5.3 |
| | Over votes | 17 | 0.1 |
| Total votes | | 23,592 | 100% |
| Democratic hold | | | |

=== District 18 ===
==== General election ====
2024 Hawaii's 18th Senate district election
| Party | Candidate | Votes | % |
|---|---|---|---|
| Democratic | Michelle Kidani (incumbent) | 13,670 | 61.7 |
| Republican | Emil Svrcina | 6,978 | 31.5 |
| | Blank votes | 1,508 | 6.8 |
| | Over votes | 9 | 0.0 |
| Total votes | | 22,165 | 100% |
| Democratic hold | | | |

=== District 19 ===
Primary and general election cancelled because no opposition filed. Incumbent Democrat Henry Aquino re-elected.

=== District 22 ===
==== Democratic primary ====
2024 Hawaii's 22nd Senate district Democratic primary
| Party | Candidate | Votes | % |
|---|---|---|---|
| Democratic | Cedric Asuega Gates | | |
| Democratic | Stacelynn Kehaulani Eli | | |
| Total votes | | | 100.00 |

==== Republican primary ====
2024 Hawaii's 22nd Senate district Republican primary
| Party | Candidate | Votes | % |
|---|---|---|---|
| Republican | Samantha DeCorte | | |
| Republican | Teri Kia Savaiinaea | | |
| Total votes | | | 100.00 |

==== General election ====
2024 Hawaii's 22nd Senate district election
| Party | Candidate | Votes | % |
|---|---|---|---|
| Republican | Samantha DeCorte | 6,849 | 53.1 |
| Democratic | Cedric Gates | 5,711 | 44.3 |
| | Blank votes | 318 | 2.5 |
| | Over votes | 14 | 0.1 |
| Total votes | | 12,892 | 100% |
| Republican gain from Democratic | | | |

=== District 23 ===
==== Democratic primary ====
2024 Hawaii's 23rd Senate district Democratic primary
| Party | Candidate | Votes | % |
|---|---|---|---|
| Democratic | Ben Schafer | | |
| Democratic | Clayton Hee | | |
| Total votes | | | 100.00 |

==== General election ====
2024 Hawaii's 23rd Senate district election
| Party | Candidate | Votes | % |
|---|---|---|---|
| Republican | Brenton Awa (incumbent) | 10,567 | 50.3 |
| Democratic | Ben Shafer | 9,477 | 45.1 |
| | Blank votes | 946 | 4.5 |
| | Over votes | 21 | 0.1 |
| Total votes | | 21,011 | 100% |
| Republican hold | | | |

=== District 24 ===
Primary and general election cancelled because no opposition filed. Incumbent Democrat Jarrett Keohokalole re-elected.

== See also ==
- Elections in Hawaii
- List of Hawaii state legislatures
