= 2022 Hawaii Senate election =

- November 8, 2022

All 25 seats in the Hawaii Senate 13 seats needed for a majority
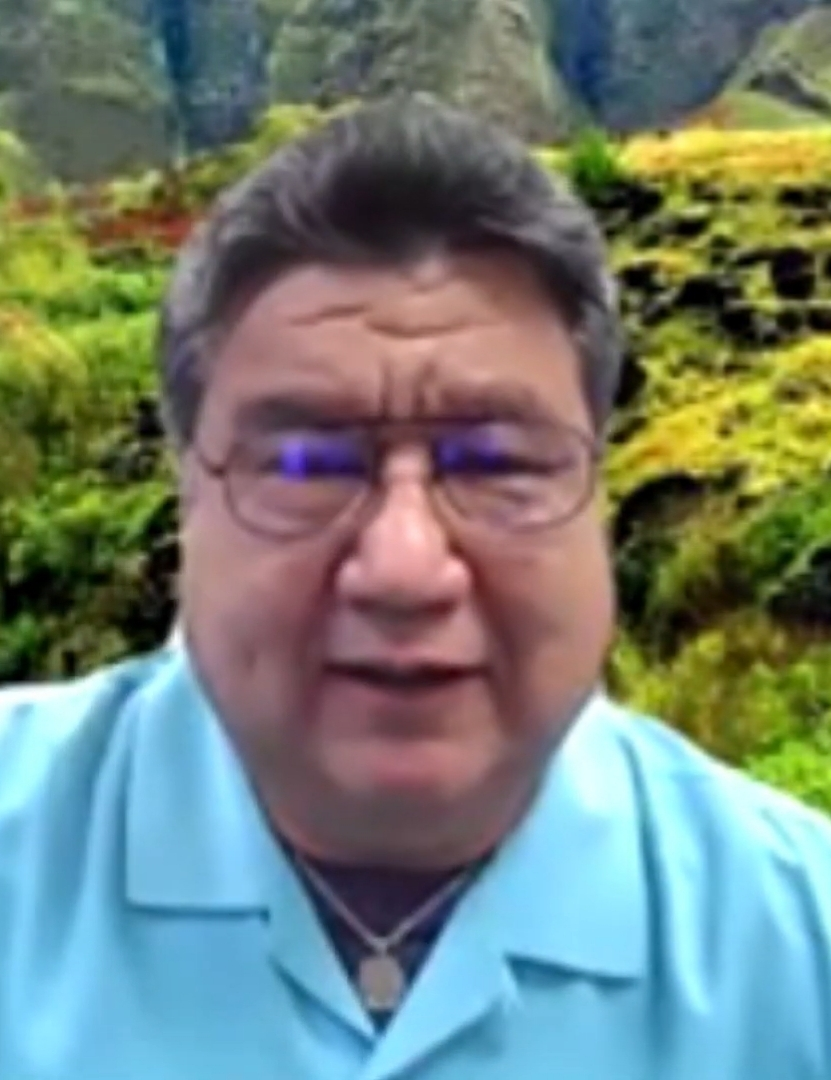

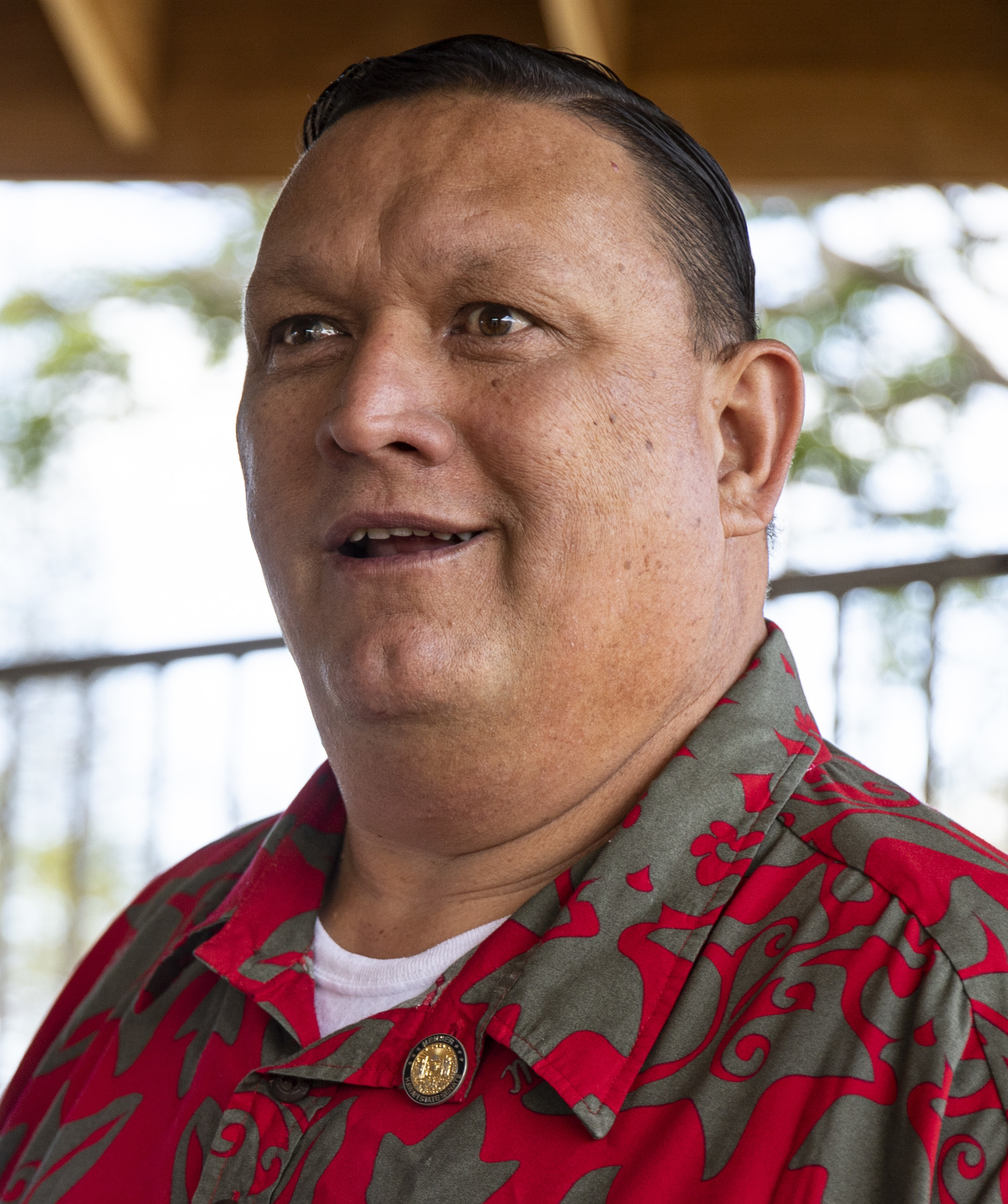
	Majority party	Minority party
Leader	Ron Kouchi	Kurt Fevella
Party	Democratic	Republican
Leader's seat	8th district	19th district
Seats before	24	1
Seats after	23	2
Seat change	▼1	▲1
Popular vote	231,076	103,919
Percentage	68.02%	30.59%
Swing	▲5.74%	▼0.56%
- Democratic hold Democratic gain Republican hold Republican gain Democrats: 50-60% 60-70% 70-80% Uncontested; Republicans 50-60% Uncontested
President before election
Ron Kouchi
Democratic
Elected President
Ron Kouchi
Democratic

The 2022 Hawaii Senate elections were held on November 8, 2022, to elect senators in all 25 districts of the state Senate of the U.S. state of Hawaii. Due to the chamber's use of the 2-4-4 term system, members were elected in single-member constituencies, with half of them serving two-year terms and the other half serving four-year terms. These elections were held concurrently with various federal and state elections, including for governor of Hawaii. Partisan primaries were held on August 13.

The Democratic Party maintained supermajority control of the chamber, although Republicans were able to win two seats, a first for the party since the 2008 election.

== Predictions ==
Source	Ranking	As of
Sabato's Crystal Ball	Safe D	May 19, 2022

== Overview ==
Party	Candidates	Votes		Seats		
Party	Candidates	No.	%	Before	After	+/–
Democratic	33	231,076	68.02	24	23	▼1
Republican	29	103,919	30.59	1	2	▲1
Green	2	1,915	0.56	0	0	Steady
Aloha ʻĀina	1	1,225	0.36	0	0	Steady
Nonpartisan	1	985	0.29	0	0	Steady
Libertarian	1	593	0.17	0	0	Steady
Total		339,713	100.00	25	25	Steady

Popular vote
Democratic	68.02%
Republican	30.59%
Others	1.39%

Senate seats
Democratic	92.00%
Republican	8.00%

=== Summary by district ===
District	Incumbent (Note: Some districts may have no incumbents, while others may have multiple incumbents due to redistricting.)	Party	Elected Senator	Party
1st	Laura Acasio	Dem	Lorraine Inouye	Dem
1st	Lorraine Inouye	Dem	Lorraine Inouye	Dem
2nd	Joy San Buenaventura	Dem	Joy San Buenaventura	Dem
3rd	Dru Kanuha	Dem	Dru Kanuha	Dem
4th	New seat		Tim Richards III	Dem
5th	Gilbert Keith-Agaran	Dem	Gilbert Keith-Agaran	Dem
6th	Rosalyn Baker	Dem	Angus McKelvey	Dem
7th	Lynn DeCoite	Dem	Lynn DeCoite	Dem
8th	Ron Kouchi	Dem	Ron Kouchi	Dem
9th	Stanley Chang	Dem	Stanley Chang	Dem
10th	Les Ihara Jr.	Dem	Les Ihara Jr.	Dem
11th	Brian Taniguchi	Dem	Carol Fukunaga	Dem
12th	Sharon Moriwaki	Dem	Sharon Moriwaki	Dem
13th	Karl Rhoads	Dem	Karl Rhoads	Dem
14th	Donna Mercado Kim	Dem	Donna Mercado Kim	Dem
15th	Glenn Wakai	Dem	Glenn Wakai	Dem
16th	Bennette Misalucha	Dem	Brandon Elefante	Dem
17th	Donovan Dela Cruz	Dem	Donovan Dela Cruz	Dem
18th	Michelle Kidani	Dem	Michelle Kidani	Dem
19th	Clarence Nishihara	Dem	Henry Aquino	Dem
20th	Kurt Fevella	Rep	Kurt Fevella	Rep
21st	Mike Gabbard	Dem	Mike Gabbard	Dem
22nd	Maile Shimabukuro	Dem	Maile Shimabukuro	Dem
23rd	Gil Riviere	Dem	Brenton Awa	Rep
24th	Jarrett Keohokalole	Dem	Jarrett Keohokalole	Dem
25th	Chris Lee	Dem	Chris Lee	Dem

=== Closest races ===
Districts where the margin of victory was under 10%:

1. District 22, 0.72%
2. District 23, 2.50% (gain)

== Retiring incumbents ==
=== Democrats ===
1. District 6: Rosalyn Baker was retiring.
2. District 11: Brian Taniguchi was retiring.
3. District 19: Clarence Nishihara was retiring.

== Incumbents defeated ==
=== In primary elections ===
==== Democrats ====
1. District 1: Laura Acasio lost a redistricting race to fellow incumbent Lorraine Inouye.
2. District 16: Bennette Misalucha lost renomination to Brandon Elefante.

=== In general elections ===
==== Democrats ====
1. District 23: Gil Riviere lost re-election to Brenton Awa.

== Detailed results ==
=== District 1 ===
==== Democratic primary ====
Democratic primary results
Party	Candidate	Votes	%
Democratic	Lorraine Inouye (incumbent)	7,214	56.05
Democratic	Laura Acasio (incumbent)	3,925	30.50
Democratic	Wil Okabe	1,731	13.45
Total votes		12,870	100.00

==== General election ====
2022 Hawaii's 1st Senate district election
Party	Candidate	Votes	%
Democratic	Lorraine Inouye (incumbent)	12,432	70.93%
Republican	Helen Tupai	5,094	29.07%
Total votes		17,526	100.00
Democratic hold			

=== District 2 ===
==== Republican primary ====
Republican primary results
Party	Candidate	Votes	%
Republican	Holly Osborn	1,310	62.59
Republican	Dianne Hensley	783	37.41
Total votes		2,093	100.00

==== General election ====
2022 Hawaii's 2nd Senate district election
Party	Candidate	Votes	%
Democratic	Joy San Buenaventura (incumbent)	9,486	69.74%
Republican	Holly Osborn	3,522	25.89%
Libertarian	Frederick Fogel	594	4.37%
Total votes		13,602	100.00
Democratic hold			

=== District 3 ===
2022 Hawaii's 3rd Senate district election
Party	Candidate	Votes	%
Democratic	Dru Kanuha (incumbent)	–	100.00
Total votes		–	100.00
Democratic hold			

=== District 4 ===
2022 Hawaii's 4th Senate district election
Party	Candidate	Votes	%
Democratic	Tim Richards III	11,018	71.18%
Republican	Nicholas Tancheff	4,462	28.82%
Total votes		15,480	100.00
Democratic hold			

=== District 5 ===
2022 Hawaii's 5th Senate district election
Party	Candidate	Votes	%
Democratic	Gilbert Keith-Agaran (incumbent)	–	100.00
Total votes		–	100.00
Democratic hold			

=== District 6 ===
==== Democratic primary ====
Democratic primary results
Party	Candidate	Votes	%
Democratic	Angus McKelvey	3,897	59.82
Democratic	Shaina Forsyth	1,502	23.06
Democratic	Mara Goebbert	1,115	17.12
Total votes		6,514	100.00

==== Republican primary ====
Republican primary results
Party	Candidate	Votes	%
Republican	Sheila Walker	1,335	54.47
Republican	Philip Raya	1,116	45.53
Total votes		2,451	100.00

==== General election ====
2022 Hawaii's 6th Senate district election
Party	Candidate	Votes	%
Democratic	Angus McKelvey	9,387	62.26%
Republican	Sheila Walker	4,634	30.74%
Green	Melissah Shishido	1,056	7.00%
Total votes		15,077	100.00
Democratic hold			

=== District 7 ===
==== Democratic primary ====
Democratic primary results
Party	Candidate	Votes	%
Democratic	Lynn DeCoite (incumbent)	6,722	60.12
Democratic	Walter Ritte	3,739	33.44
Democratic	Leo Kaniela Caires	720	6.44
Total votes		11,181	100.00

==== General election ====
2022 Hawaii's 7th Senate district election
Party	Candidate	Votes	%
Democratic	Lynn DeCoite (incumbent)	14,161	75.70%
Republican	Tamara McKay	4,545	24.30%
Total votes		18,706	100.00
Democratic hold			

=== District 8 ===
2022 Hawaii's 8th Senate district election
Party	Candidate	Votes	%
Democratic	Ron Kouchi (incumbent)	16,234	71.41%
Republican	Ana Mo Des	5,266	23.16%
Aloha ʻĀina	Kapana Thronas-Kaho'onei	1,235	5.43%
Total votes		22,735	100.00
Democratic hold			

=== District 9 ===
2022 Hawaii's 9th Senate district election
Party	Candidate	Votes	%
Democratic	Stanley Chang (incumbent)	14,864	70.27%
Republican	Mike Parrish	6,289	29.73%
Total votes		21,153	100.00
Democratic hold			

=== District 10 ===
==== Republican primary ====
Republican primary results
Party	Candidate	Votes	%
Republican	Leilani Soon	1,334	77.51
Republican	True St. Thomas	387	22.49
Total votes		1,721	100.00

==== General election ====
2022 Hawaii's 10th Senate district election
Party	Candidate	Votes	%
Democratic	Les Ihara Jr. (incumbent)	10,264	66.98%
Republican	Leilani Soon	5,060	33.02%
Total votes		15,324	100.00
Democratic hold			

=== District 11 ===
==== Democratic primary ====
Democratic primary results
Party	Candidate	Votes	%
Democratic	Carol Fukunaga	7,914	65.46
Democratic	Ian Ross	4,176	34.54
Total votes		12,090	100.00

==== General election ====
2022 Hawaii's 11th Senate district election
Party	Candidate	Votes	%
Democratic	Carol Fukunaga	12,831	75.31%
Republican	Benjamin Sakai	4,207	24.69%
Total votes		17,038	100.00
Democratic hold			

=== District 12 ===
2022 Hawaii's 12th Senate district election
Party	Candidate	Votes	%
Democratic	Sharon Moriwaki (incumbent)	9,744	72.00%
Republican	Blake Boyd	3,789	28.00%
Total votes		13,533	100.00
Democratic hold			

=== District 13 ===
2022 Hawaii's 13th Senate district election
Party	Candidate	Votes	%
Democratic	Karl Rhoads (incumbent)	8,810	64.36%
Republican	Matthew Tinay	3,013	22.01%
Nonpartisan	Michelle Kwock	989	7.22%
Green	Kapono Aluli Souza	877	6.41%
Total votes		13,689	100.00
Democratic hold			

=== District 14 ===
2022 Hawaii's 14th Senate district election
Party	Candidate	Votes	%
Democratic	Donna Mercado Kim (incumbent)	8,123	73.57%
Republican	Cheryl Rzonca	2,918	26.43%
Total votes		11,041	100.00
Democratic hold			

=== District 15 ===
2022 Hawaii's 15th Senate district election
Party	Candidate	Votes	%
Democratic	Glenn Wakai (incumbent)	7,883	67.69%
Republican	Lorene Godfrey	3,763	32.31%
Total votes		11,646	100.00
Democratic hold			

=== District 16 ===
==== Democratic primary ====
Democratic primary results
Party	Candidate	Votes	%
Democratic	Brandon Elefante	9,680	70.83
Democratic	Bennette Misalucha (incumbent)	3,987	29.17
Total votes		13,667	100.00

==== General election ====
2022 Hawaii's 16th Senate district election
Party	Candidate	Votes	%
Democratic	Brandon Elefante	14,478	73.99%
Republican	Patricia Yuki Beekman	5,090	26.01%
Total votes		19,568	100.00
Democratic hold			

=== District 17 ===
==== Republican primary ====
Republican primary results
Party	Candidate	Votes	%
Republican	Anna Misako Hudson	2,277	69.70
Republican	Karl Dicks	990	30.30
Total votes		3,267	100.00

==== General election ====
2022 Hawaii's 17th Senate district election
Party	Candidate	Votes	%
Democratic	Donovan Dela Cruz (incumbent)	11,555	65.20%
Republican	Anna Misako Hudson	6,168	34.80%
Total votes		17,723	100.00
Democratic hold			

=== District 18 ===
==== Republican primary ====
Republican primary results
Party	Candidate	Votes	%
Republican	Mary Smart	2,295	71.88
Republican	Emil Svrcina	898	28.12
Total votes		3,193	100.00

==== General election ====
2022 Hawaii's 18th Senate district election
Party	Candidate	Votes	%
Democratic	Michelle Kidani (incumbent)	11,463	65.73%
Republican	Mary Smart	5,977	34.27%
Total votes		17,440	100.00
Democratic hold			

=== District 19 ===
==== Democratic primary ====
Democratic primary results
Party	Candidate	Votes	%
Democratic	Henry Aquino	4,898	80.68
Democratic	Roger Clemente	1,173	19.32
Total votes		6,071	100.00

==== General election ====
2022 Hawaii's 19th Senate district election
Party	Candidate	Votes	%
Democratic	Henry Aquino	–	100.00
Total votes		–	100.00
Democratic hold			

=== District 20 ===
2022 Hawaii's 20th Senate district election
Party	Candidate	Votes	%
Republican	Kurt Fevella (incumbent)	–	100.00
Total votes		–	100.00
Republican hold			

=== District 21 ===
2022 Hawaii's 21st Senate district election
Party	Candidate	Votes	%
Democratic	Mike Gabbard (incumbent)	8,164	58.89%
Republican	Matthew Khan	5,698	41.11%
Total votes		13,862	100.00
Democratic hold			

=== District 22 ===
2022 Hawaii's 22nd Senate district election
Party	Candidate	Votes	%
Democratic	Maile Shimabukuro (incumbent)	4,993	50.20%
Republican	Samantha DeCorte	4,953	49.80%
Total votes		9,946	100.00
Democratic hold			

=== District 23 ===
==== Republican primary ====
Republican primary results
Party	Candidate	Votes	%
Republican	Brenton Awa	2,990	74.01
Republican	Art Hannemann	1,050	25.99
Total votes		4,040	100.00

==== General election ====
2022 Hawaii's 23rd Senate district election
Party	Candidate	Votes	%
Republican	Brenton Awa	8,093	51.28%
Democratic	Gil Riviere (incumbent)	7,688	48.72%
Total votes		15,781	100.00
Republican gain from Democratic			

=== District 24 ===
==== Republican primary ====
Republican primary results
Party	Candidate	Votes	%
Republican	Antionette Fernandez	1,513	50.65
Republican	Adriel Lam	1,474	49.35
Total votes		2,987	100.00

==== General election ====
2022 Hawaii's 24th Senate district election
Party	Candidate	Votes	%
Democratic	Jarrett Keohokalole (incumbent)	13,669	70.29%
Republican	Antionette Fernandez	5,777	29.71%
Total votes		19,446	100.00
Democratic hold			

=== District 25 ===
2022 Hawaii's 25th Senate district election
Party	Candidate	Votes	%
Democratic	Chris Lee (incumbent)	14,865	70.30%
Republican	Brian Lauro	6,280	29.70%
Total votes		21,145	100.00
Democratic hold			

== See also ==
- 2022 Hawaii gubernatorial election
- 2022 Hawaii House of Representatives election
