= 2020 United States House of Representatives elections in Hawaii =

- November 3, 2020

All 2 Hawaii seats to the United States House of Representatives
- Turnout: 63.3% ▲12.7 pp
	Majority party	Minority party
Party	Democratic	Republican
Last election	2	0
Seats won	2	0
Seat change	Steady	Steady
Popular vote	354,762	155,215
Percentage	67.38%	29.48%
Swing	▼7.93%	▲6.63%

Democratic
60–70%
70–80%

The 2020 United States House of Representatives elections in Hawaii were held on November 3, 2020, to elect the two U.S. representatives from the state of Hawaii, one from each of the state's two congressional districts. The elections coincided with the 2020 U.S. presidential election, as well as other elections to the House of Representatives, elections to the United States Senate and various state and local elections. The state's primary elections were held on August 8, 2020.

Beginning with the 2020 election cycle, per Act 136, Session Laws of Hawaii 2019, all state elections are conducted by mail.

== Overview ==
=== District ===
Results of the 2020 United States House of Representatives elections in Hawaii by district:

District	Democratic		Republican		Others		Total		Result
District	Votes	%	Votes	%	Votes	%	Votes	%	Result
District 1	183,245	72.02%	71,188	27.98%	0	0.00%	254,433	100.00%	Democratic hold
District 2	171,517	63.01%	84,027	30.87%	16,558	6.08%	272,102	100.00%	Democratic hold
Total	354,762	67.38%	155,215	29.48%	16,558	3.14%	526,535	100.00%	

Popular vote
Democratic	67.38%
Republican	29.48%
Other	3.14%

House seats
Democratic	100.00%

== District 1 ==
The 1st district is located entirely on the island of Oahu, centering on Honolulu and the towns of, Aiea, Mililani, Pearl City, Waipahu and Waimalu. The incumbent was Democrat Ed Case, who was elected with 73.1% of the vote in 2018.

2020 Hawaii's 1st congressional district election
- November 3, 2020
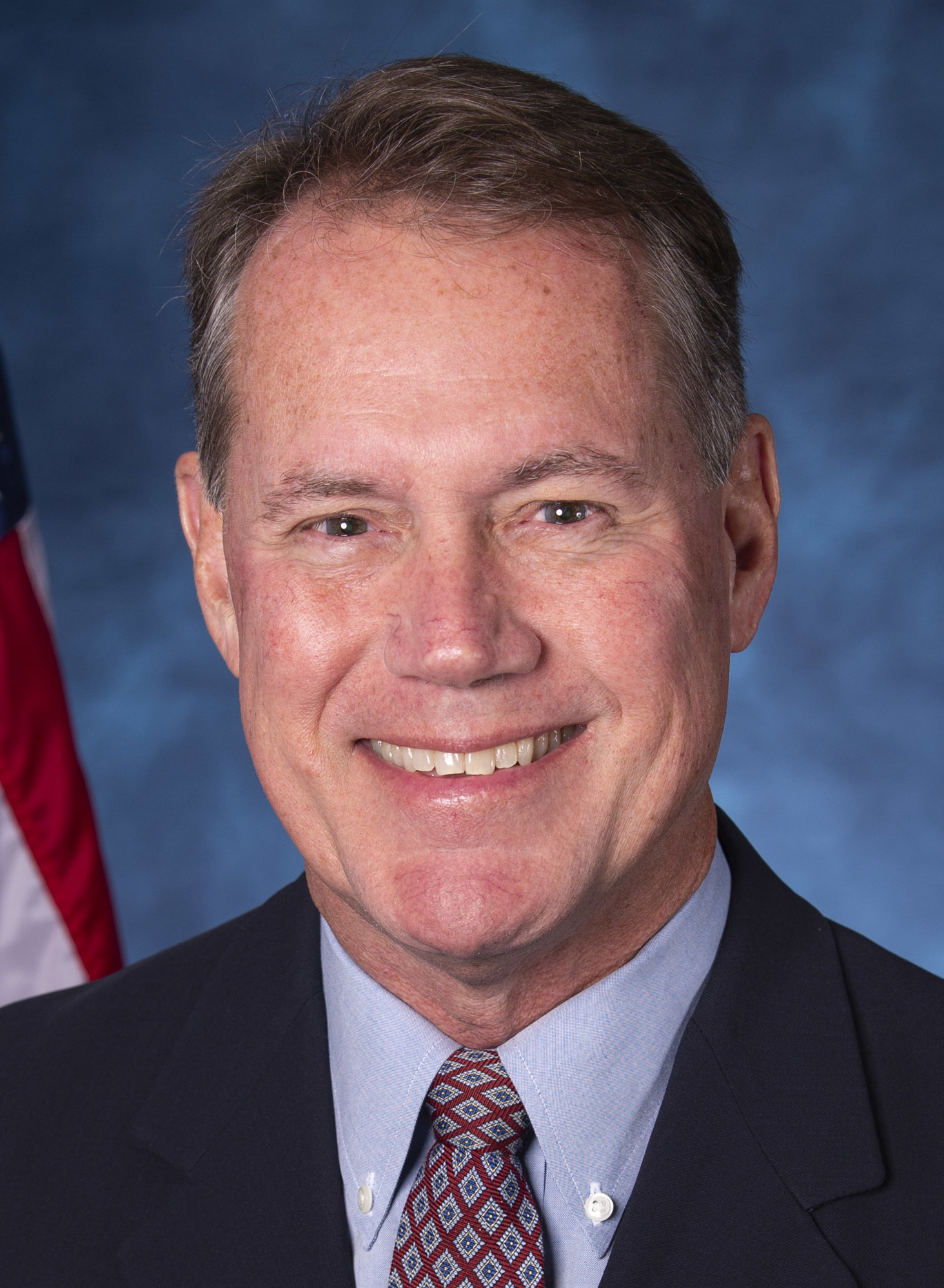

Nominee	Ed Case	Ron Curtis
Party	Democratic	Republican
Popular vote	183,245	71,188
Percentage	72.0%	28.0%
- Precinct results Case: 50–60% 60–70% 70–80% 80–90% Curtis: 50–60% No votes
U.S. Representative before election
Ed Case
Democratic
Elected U.S. Representative
Ed Case
Democratic

=== Democratic primary ===
==== Candidates ====
===== Nominee =====
- Ed Case, incumbent U.S. representative

==== Primary results ====
Democratic primary results
Party	Candidate	Votes	%
Democratic	Ed Case (incumbent)	131,802	100.0
Total votes		131,802	100.0

=== Republican primary ===
==== Candidates ====
===== Nominee =====
- Ron Curtis, engineer and nominee for U.S. Senate in 2018

===== Eliminated in primary =====
- James Dickens, salesman
- Nancy Olson, family nurse practitioner
- Arturo Reyes, perennial candidate
- Taylor Smith

==== Primary results ====
Republican primary results
Party	Candidate	Votes	%
Republican	Ron Curtis	13,909	41.1
Republican	James Dickens	7,120	21.0
Republican	Nancy Olson	6,665	19.7
Republican	Arturo Reyes	4,301	12.7
Republican	Taylor Smith	1,839	5.4
Total votes		33,834	100.0

=== Nonpartisan primary ===
According to the election laws of Hawaii, in order for nonpartisan candidates to appear on the general election ballot, they must receive at least 10% of votes cast (16,529 votes) or receive as many or more votes than any other candidate who won a partisan nomination (≥ 13,873 votes). Griffin failed to do either, and did not appear on the November ballot.

==== Candidates ====
===== Disqualified =====
- Calvin Griffin

==== Primary results ====
Nonpartisan primary results
Party	Candidate	Votes	%
Nonpartisan	Calvin Griffin	2,324	100.0
Total votes		2,317	100.0

=== General election ===
==== Predictions ====
Source	Ranking	As of
The Cook Political Report	Safe D	November 2, 2020
Inside Elections	Safe D	October 28, 2020
Sabato's Crystal Ball	Safe D	November 2, 2020
Politico	Safe D	November 2, 2020
Daily Kos	Safe D	November 2, 2020
RCP	Safe D	November 2, 2020

==== Results ====
Hawaii's 1st congressional district election, 2020
Party	Candidate	Votes	%	±%
Democratic	Ed Case (incumbent)	183,245	72.02%	−1.08%
Republican	Ron Curtis	71,188	27.98%	+4.91%
Total votes		254,433	100.00%	
Democratic hold				

==== By county ====
County	Ed Case Democratic		Ron Curtis Republican		Margin		Total
County	#	%	#	%	#	%	Total
Honolulu (part)	183,245	72.02%	71,188	27.98%	112,057	44.04%	254,433

== District 2 ==
2020 Hawaii's 2nd congressional district election
- November 3, 2020
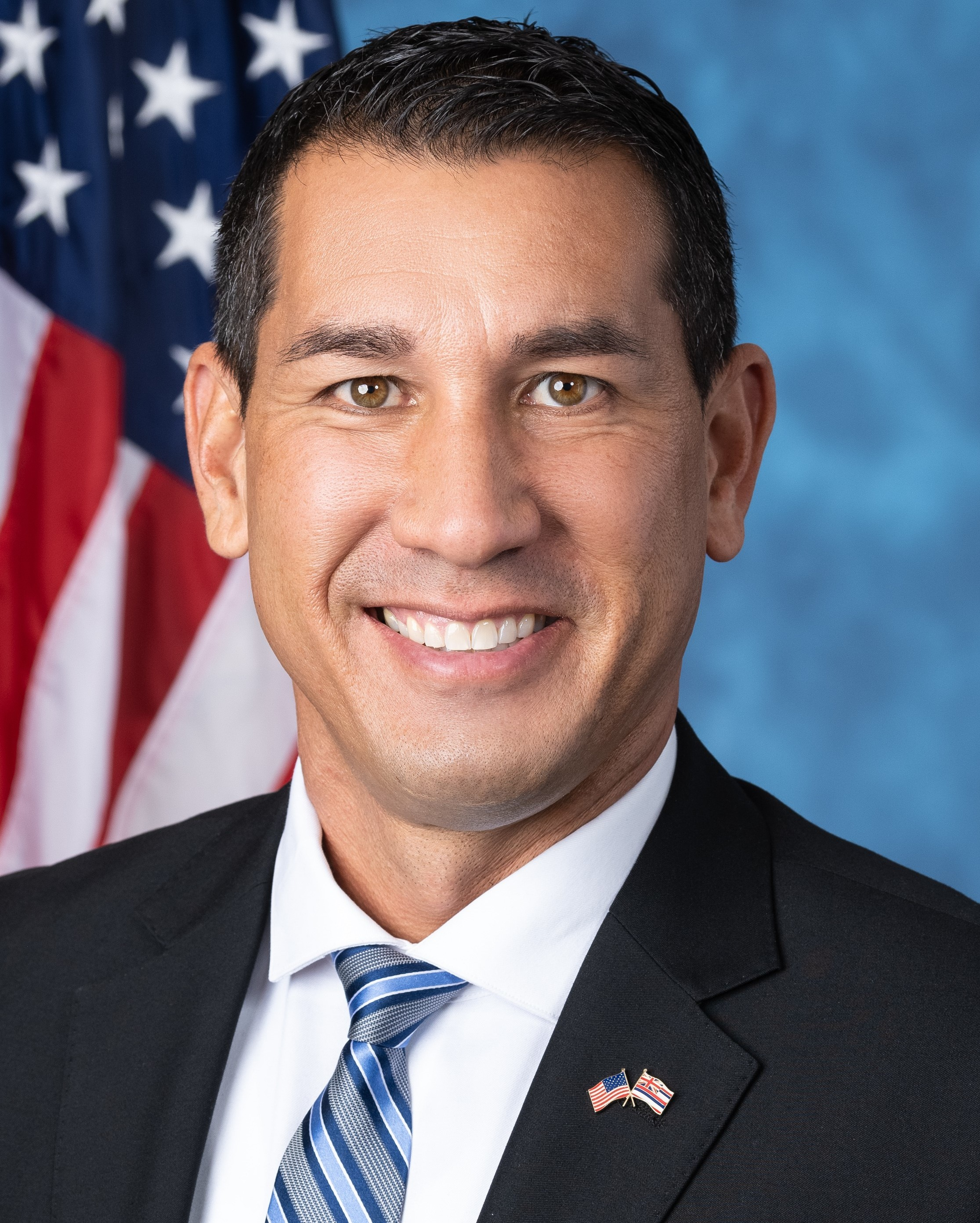

Nominee	Kai Kahele	Joe Akana
Party	Democratic	Republican
Popular vote	171,517	84,027
Percentage	63.0%	30.9%
- Precinct results Kahele: 40–50% 50–60% 60–70% 70–80% 80–90% Akana: 50–60% 60–70% 70–80% No votes
U.S. Representative before election
Tulsi Gabbard
Democratic
Elected U.S. Representative
Kai Kahele
Democratic

The 2nd district takes in rural and suburban Oahu, including Waimanalo Beach, Kailua, Kaneohe, Kahuku, Makaha, Nanakuli, as well as encompassing all the other islands of Hawaii, taking in Maui and Hilo. The incumbent was Democrat Tulsi Gabbard, who was reelected with 77.4% of the vote in 2018 and announced that she would run for President of the United States in 2020. Hawaii law permits candidates to run for both Congress and the presidency.

On October 25, 2019, Gabbard announced she would not seek reelection to focus on her presidential campaign. However, she suspended her campaign on March 19, 2020, after lower result ratings in the primaries and endorsed former Vice President Joe Biden's campaign. Hawaii's Office of Elections forbids candidate filing for any of the state's 2020 elections after June 2, 2020.

=== Democratic primary ===
==== Nominee ====
- Kai Kahele, state senator

==== Defeated in primary ====
- Brian Evans, singer and Republican nominee for Hawaii's 2nd congressional district in 2018
- Noelle Famera, small business owner and activist (endorsed Hoomanawanui after the primary elections)
- Brenda Lee

==== Withdrawn ====
- David Cornejo, software engineer
- Ryan Meza, investor, entrepreneur, and a consultant (endorsed Famera)

==== Declined ====
- Alan Arakawa, former mayor of Maui
- Kirk Caldwell, mayor of Honolulu
- Bernard Carvalho, former mayor of Kauai
- Beth Fukumoto, former state representative
- Tulsi Gabbard, incumbent U.S. representative, former 2020 candidate for U.S. president
- Kaniela Ing, former state representative
- Donna Mercado Kim, state senator and former president of the Hawaii Senate
- Chris Lee, state representative
- Ernie Martin, former chair of the Honolulu City Council
- Jill Tokuda, former state senator

==== Endorsements ====
Kai Kahele

Federal officials

- Ed Case, U.S. representative
- Judy Chu, U.S. representative
- Jason Crow, U.S. representative
- Chrissy Houlahan, U.S. representative
- Pramila Jayapal, U.S. representative
- Hakeem Jeffries, U.S. representative
- Seth Moulton, U.S. representative
- Barack Obama, 44th president of the United States
- Mark Pocan, U.S. representative
- Max Rose, U.S. representative
- Brian Schatz, U.S. senator from Hawaii
- Brad Sherman, U.S. representative
- Mikie Sherrill, U.S. representative
- Mark Takano, U.S. representative

State officials

- Neil Abercrombie, former governor of Hawaii
- Ben Cayetano, former governor of Hawaii
- John D. Waiheʻe III, former governor of Hawaii

State legislators

- Joy San Buenaventura, state representative
- Stanley Chang, state senator
- Stacelynn Kehaulani Eli, state representative
- Kurt Fevella, state senator
- Cedric Gates, state representative
- Kaniela Ing, former state representative
- Dru Kanuha, state senator
- Jarrett Keohokalole, state senator
- Michelle Kidani, state senator
- Ron Kouchi, President of the Hawaii Senate
- Clarence Nishihara, state senator
- Gil Riviere, state senator
- Maile Shimabukuro, state senator
- Chris Toshiro Todd, state representative
- Tina Wildberger, state representative

Other individuals

- Ikaika Anderson, chair of the Honolulu City Council
- Bernard Carvalho, former mayor of Kauai
- Howard Dean, former governor of Vermont
- Neera Tanden, president of Center for American Progress and Hillary Clinton campaign adviser
- Shan Tsutsui, former lieutenant governor of Hawaii

Organizations

- ASPIRE PAC
- Congressional Black Caucus
- Congressional Progressive Caucus
- Daily Kos
- Human Rights Campaign
- League of Conservation Voters
- Planned Parenthood
- Serve America PAC

Unions

- Hawaiian Airlines Pilots ALPA MEC
- Hawaii Masons Union, Local 1
- HGEA AFSCME, Local 152
- International Association of Bridge, Structural, Ornamental and Reinforcing Iron Workers, Local 625
- International Longshore and Warehouse Union, Local 142
- Spirit Airlines Pilots ALPA MEC
Hypothetical polling

Tulsi Gabbard vs. Kai Kahele

Poll source	Date(s) administered	Sample size (Note: Key: A – all adults RV – registered voters LV – likely voters V – unclear)	Margin of error	Tulsi Gabbard	Kai Kahele	Undecided
Public Policy Polling	September 27–29, 2019	990 (V)	± 3.4%	48%	26%	27%

Tulsi Gabbard vs. Generic Opponent

Poll source	Date(s) administered	Sample size	Margin of error	Tulsi Gabbard	Generic Opponent	Undecided
Public Policy Polling	September 27–29, 2019	990 (V)	± 3.4%	38%	50%	11%

==== Primary results ====
2020 Hawaii's 2nd congressional district Democratic primary results by county Map legend: Kahele—70–80%; No data

Democratic primary results
Party	Candidate	Votes	%
Democratic	Kai Kahele	100,841	76.5
Democratic	Brian Evans	12,337	9.3
Democratic	Brenda Lee	10,694	8.1
Democratic	Noelle Famera	7,992	6.1
Total votes		131,864	100.0

=== Republican primary ===
==== Candidates ====
===== Nominee =====
- Joe Akana, U.S. Air Force veteran

===== Defeated in primary =====
- Steven Bond
- Karla Bart Gottschalk, retired civil rights lawyer and candidate for U.S. Senate in 2016
- David Hamman, locksmith
- Elise Hatsuko Kaneshiro
- Nicholas Love, pastor
- Robert Nagamine, former lieutenant colonel in the Hawaii Air National Guard
- Raymond Quel, security protection specialist
- Felipe San Nicolas, former telecommunications manager

===== Declined =====
- Samuel Wilder King II, attorney
- Steve Rousseau

==== Primary results ====
2020 Hawaii's 2nd congressional district Republican primary results by county Map legend: Akana—40–50%; Akana—30–40%; No data

Republican primary results
Party	Candidate	Votes	%
Republican	Joe Akana	15,107	44.1
Republican	Elise Kaneshiro	5,294	15.5
Republican	David Hamman	3,430	10.0
Republican	Robert Nagamine	2,887	8.4
Republican	Nicholas Love	2,616	7.6
Republican	Steven Bond	2,218	6.5
Republican	Felipe San Nicolas	1,465	4.3
Republican	Karla Bart Gottschalk	953	2.8
Republican	Raymond Quel	305	0.9
Total votes		34,275	100.0

=== Libertarian primary ===
==== Candidates ====
===== Nominee =====
- Michelle Rose Tippens, executive director and Libertarian nominee for Hawaii's 1st congressional district in 2018

==== Primary results ====
Libertarian primary results
Party	Candidate	Votes	%
Libertarian	Michelle Rose Tippens	1,014	100.0
Total votes		1,014	100.0

=== American Shopping primary ===
==== Candidates ====
===== Nominee =====
- John Giuffre, perennial candidate

==== Primary results ====
American Shopping primary results
Party	Candidate	Votes	%
American Shopping	John Giuffre	134	100.0
Total votes		134	100.0

=== Aloha Aina primary ===
==== Candidates ====
===== Nominee =====
- Jonathan Hoomanawanui, VFW service officer

==== Primary results ====
Aloha ʻĀina primary results
Party	Candidate	Votes	%
Aloha ʻĀina	Jonathan Hoomanawanui	3,423	100.0
Total votes		3,423	100.0

=== Nonpartisan primary ===
According to election laws of Hawaii, in order for nonpartisan candidates to appear on the general election ballot, they had to receive at least 10% of votes cast (17,049 votes) or receive as many or more votes than any other candidate that won a partisan nomination (≥ 133 votes). Burrus fulfilled the latter requirement and was on the November ballot.

==== Candidates ====
===== Nominee =====
- Ron Burrus, analyst

===== Eliminated in primary =====
- Byron McCorriston, entrepreneur

==== Primary results ====
Nonpartisan primary results
Party	Candidate	Votes	%
Nonpartisan	Ron Burrus	1,308	59.2
Nonpartisan	Byron McCorriston	901	40.8
Total votes		2,209	100.0

=== General election ===
==== Predictions ====
Source	Ranking	As of
The Cook Political Report	Safe D	November 2, 2020
Inside Elections	Safe D	October 28, 2020
Sabato's Crystal Ball	Safe D	November 2, 2020
Politico	Safe D	November 2, 2020
Daily Kos	Safe D	November 2, 2020
RCP	Safe D	November 2, 2020

==== Results ====
Hawaii's 2nd congressional district election, 2020
Party	Candidate	Votes	%	±%
Democratic	Kai Kahele	171,517	63.01%	−14.35%
Republican	Joe Akana	84,027	30.87%	+8.23%
Libertarian	Michelle Rose Tippens	6,785	2.49%	N/A
Aloha ʻĀina	Jonathan Hoomanawanui	6,453	2.37%	N/A
Nonpartisan	Ron Burrus	2,659	0.98%	N/A
American Shopping	John Giuffre	661	0.24%	N/A
Total votes		272,192	100.00%	
Democratic hold				

==== By county ====
County	Kai Kahele Democratic		Joe Akana Republican		Various candidates Other parties		Margin		Total
County	#	%	#	%	#	%	#	%	Total
Hawaii	55,774	68.0%	20,897	25.5%	5,401	6.5%	34,877	42.5%	82,072
Honolulu (part)	53,723	56.4%	35,777	37.6%	5,739	6.0%	17,946	18.8%	95,239
Kauaʻi	19,880	66.9%	8,233	27.7%	1,611	5.4%	11,647	39.2%	29,724
Maui	41,140	64.8%	19,120	29.4%	3,807	5.9%	23,020	35.4%	65,067
Totals	171,517	63.0%	84,027	30.9%	16,558	6.1%	87,490	32.1%	272,102

== See also ==
- 2020 Hawaii elections
