= 2026 United States House of Representatives elections in Hawaii =

- November 3, 2026

Both Hawaii seats to the United States House of Representatives
	Majority party	Minority party
Party	Democratic	Republican
Last election	2	0
Seats won	2	0
Seat change	Steady	Steady
Popular vote	255,550	105,424
Percentage	69.00%	28.47%
Swing	▼0.03%	▼0.74%

Democratic
60–70%
70–80%

The 2026 United States House of Representatives elections in Hawaii were held on November 3, 2026, to elect the two U.S. representatives from the State of Hawaii, one from both of the state's congressional districts. The elections coincided with the other elections to the House of Representatives, elections to the United States Senate, and various state and local elections. The primary elections took place on August 8, 2026.

== District 1 ==
2026 Hawaii's 1st congressional district election
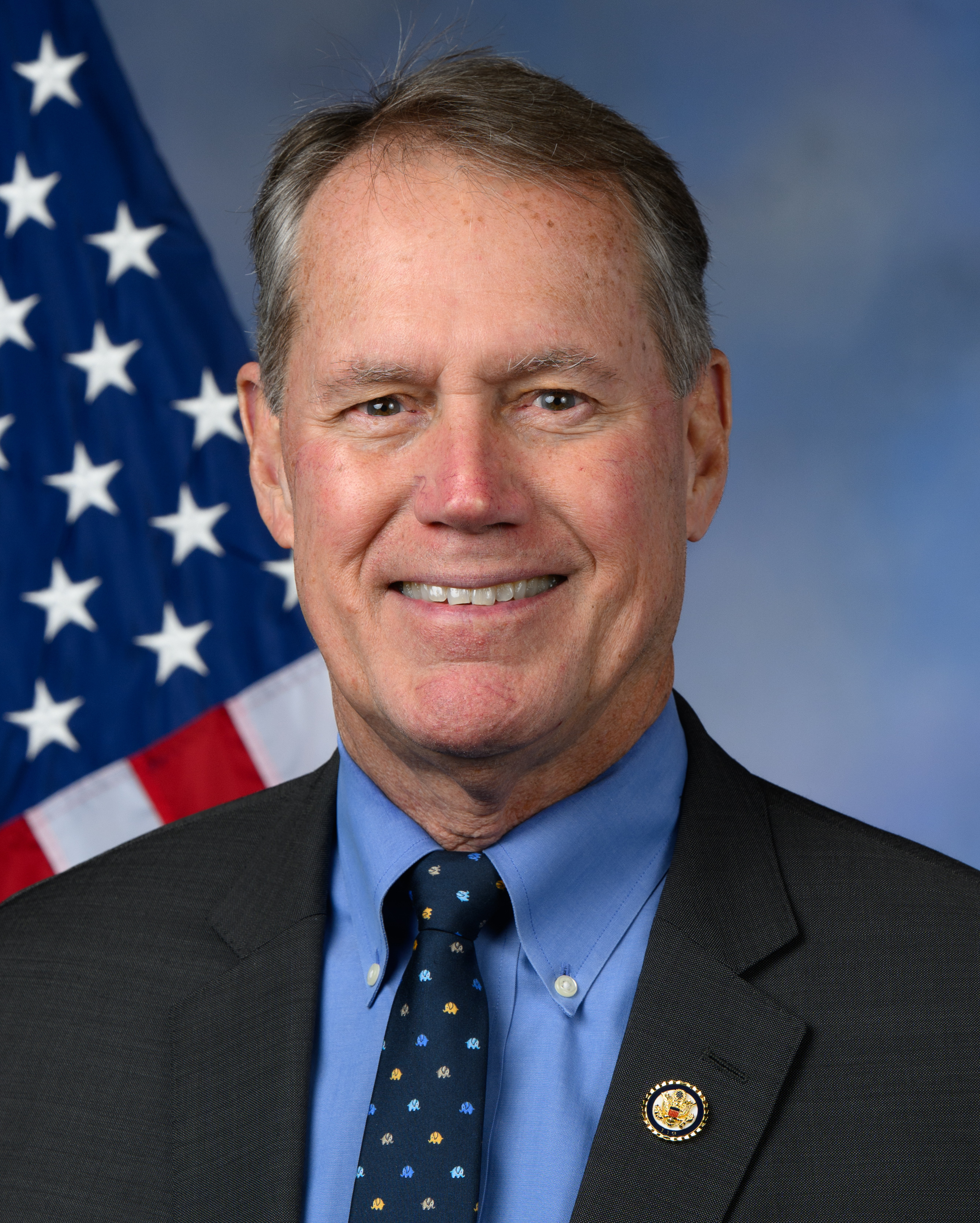

Nominee	Ed Case	Adriel Lam
Party	Democratic	Republican
Popular vote	126,337	40,308
Percentage	71.8%	22.9%
U.S. Representative before election
Ed Case
Democratic
Elected U.S. Representative
Ed Case
Democratic

The 1st district is entirely on the island of Oahu, centering on Honolulu and the towns of Aiea, Mililani, Pearl City, Waipahu, and Waimalu. The incumbent is Democrat Ed Case, who was reelected with 71.8% of the vote in 2024.

=== Democratic primary ===
==== Candidates ====
===== Nominee =====
- Ed Case, incumbent U.S. representative

===== Eliminated in primary =====
- Jennifer Booker, engineer and nurse
- Ben Fatula, veteran and chef
- Jarrett Keohokalole, state senator from the 24th district (2018–present)
- Nicholas Kiswanto, civil servant

===== Withdrawn =====
- Della Au Belatti, state representative from the 26th district (2006–present) (running for Lieutenant Governor)

==== Endorsements ====
Ed Case

Statewide officials

- David Ige, former governor of Hawaii (2014–2022)

Organizations

- American Federation of Government Employees
- AIPAC
- League of Conservation Voters Action Fund
- Planned Parenthood Action Fund
- Population Connection
Jarrett Keohokalole

Statewide officials

- Neil Abercrombie, former governor of Hawaii (2010–2014) and former congressman HI-01 (1986–1987, 1991–2010)

State legislators

- Blake Oshiro, former state representative from the 33rd district (2001–2011)
- Sean Quinlan, majority leader of the Hawaii House of Representatives (2024–present) from the 47th district (2016–present)

Individuals

- Walter Dods, retired First Hawaiian Bank executive
- Ms. Rachel, YouTuber and children's educator

Labor unions

- Hawaii Regional Council of Carpenters Local 745
- International Longshore and Warehouse Union Local 142
- Laborers' International Union of North America Local 368
- National Education Association
- Hawaiʻi State Teachers Association
- United Food and Commercial Workers Local 480

Organizations

- Center for Biological Diversity Action Fund
- Climate Hawks Vote
- College Democrats of America
- Friends of the Earth Action
- Indivisible
- Indivisible Hawaii
- Our Revolution
- Peace Action
- Progressive Democrats of America

==== Fundraising ====
Italics indicate a withdrawn candidate.

Campaign finance reports as of July 19, 2026
Candidate	Raised	Spent	Cash on hand
Ed Case (D)	$1,093,795	$810,804	$599,649
Jarrett Keohokalole (D)	$963,458	$882,071	$81,387
Source: Federal Election Commission

==== Polling ====
Poll source	Date(s) administered	Sample size (Note: Key: A – all adults RV – registered voters LV – likely voters V – unclear)	Margin of error	Della Au Belatti	Ed Case	Jarett Keohokalole	Undecided
Blueprint Polling (D) (Note: Poll sponsored by Keohokalole's campaign)	July 24, 2026	278 (LV)	—	—	38%	47%	15%
Blueprint Polling (D) (Note: Poll sponsored by Keohokalole's campaign)	July 7–8, 2026	481 (LV)	—	—	33%	25%	42%
	May 28, 2026	Belatti withdraws from the race to run for Lieutenant Governor of Hawaii					
Data for Progress (D) (Note: Poll sponsored by Our Hawai'i and Indivisible)	October 6–14, 2025	366 (LV)	± 5.0%	16%	40%	12%	32%
Data for Progress (D)	October 6–14, 2025	366 (LV)	± 5.0%	—	44%	25%	31%
Data for Progress (D)	October 6–14, 2025	366 (LV)	± 5.0%	26%	44%	—	29%

Hypothetical polling

Ed Case vs. generic Democrat

Poll source	Date(s) administered	Sample size	Margin of error	Ed Case	Generic Democrat	Undecided
Data for Progress (D)	October 6–14, 2025	366 (LV)	± 5.0%	43%	36%	21%

==== Results ====
Results by precinct Case: 40–50%; 50–60%; 60–70%; 70–80%; 90–100%; Keohokalole: 40–50%; 50–60%; 60–70%; No votes

Democratic primary results
Party	Candidate	Votes	%
Democratic	Ed Case (incumbent)	63,784	58.5
Democratic	Jarrett Keohokalole	40,848	37.4
Democratic	Jennifer Booker	2,433	2.2
Democratic	Ben Fatula	1,025	0.9
Democratic	Nicholas Kiswanto	1,025	0.9
Total votes		109,115	100.0

=== Republican primary ===
==== Candidates ====
===== Nominee =====
- Adriel Lam, candidate for U.S. Senate in 2024

===== Not on ballot =====
- Maxwell Frazier, electronic technician
- Gavin Solomon, businessman from New York

Republican primary results
Party	Candidate	Votes	%
Republican	Adriel Lam	18,530	100.0
Total votes		18,530	100.0

=== Third party and independent candidates ===
==== Independent candidates ====
===== Declared =====
- Nathan Berning

==== Green Party ====
===== Nominee =====
- Jordan Conley, fitness professional

Green primary results
Party	Candidate	Votes	%
Green	Jordan Conley	402	100.0
Total votes		402	100.0

=== General election ===
==== Predictions ====
Source	Ranking	As of
Decision Desk HQ	Safe D	July 14, 2026
The Cook Political Report	Solid D	February 6, 2025
Inside Elections	Solid D	March 7, 2025
Sabato's Crystal Ball	Safe D	July 15, 2025
Silver Bulletin	Solid D	August 20, 2026

== District 2 ==
2026 Hawaii's 2nd congressional district election
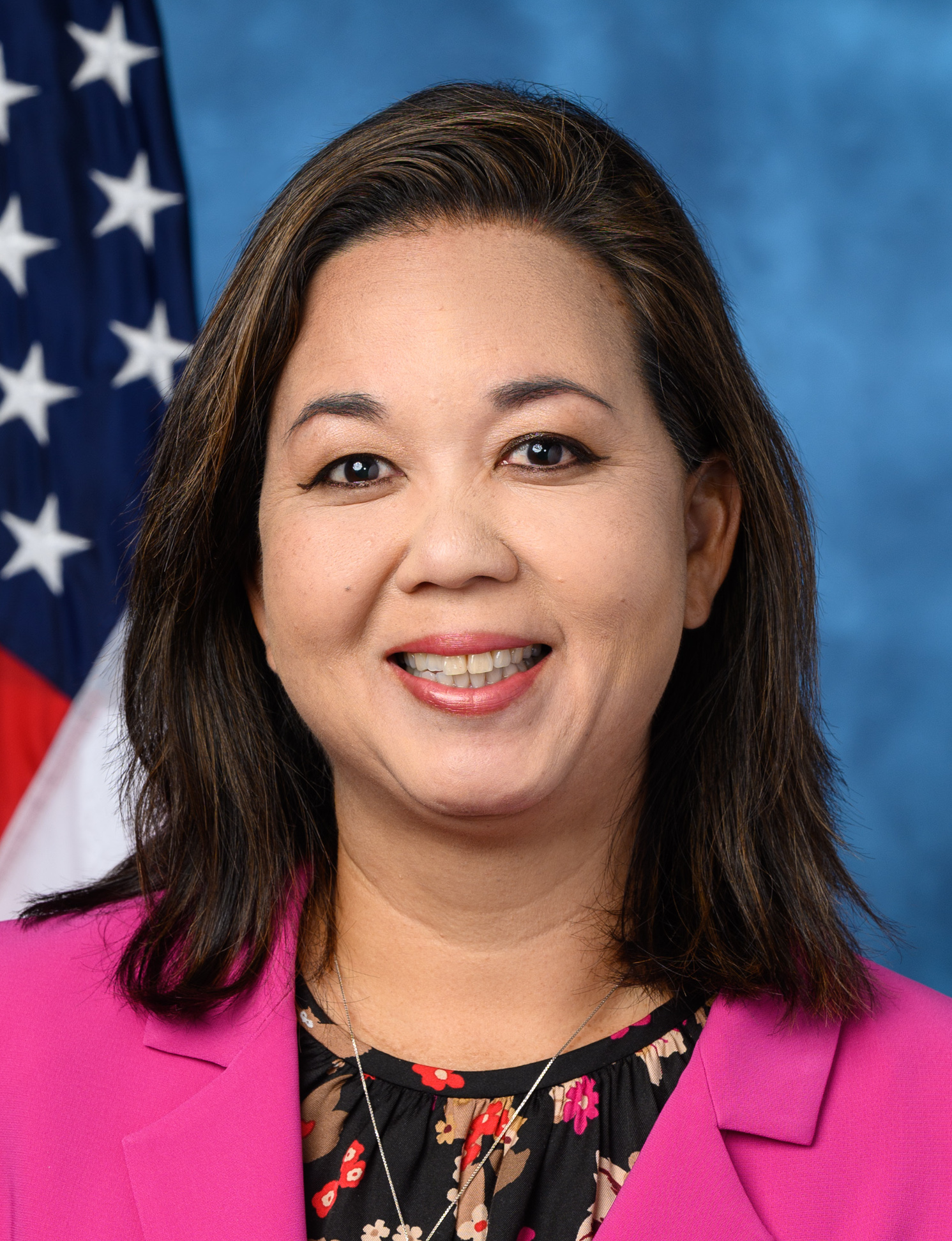

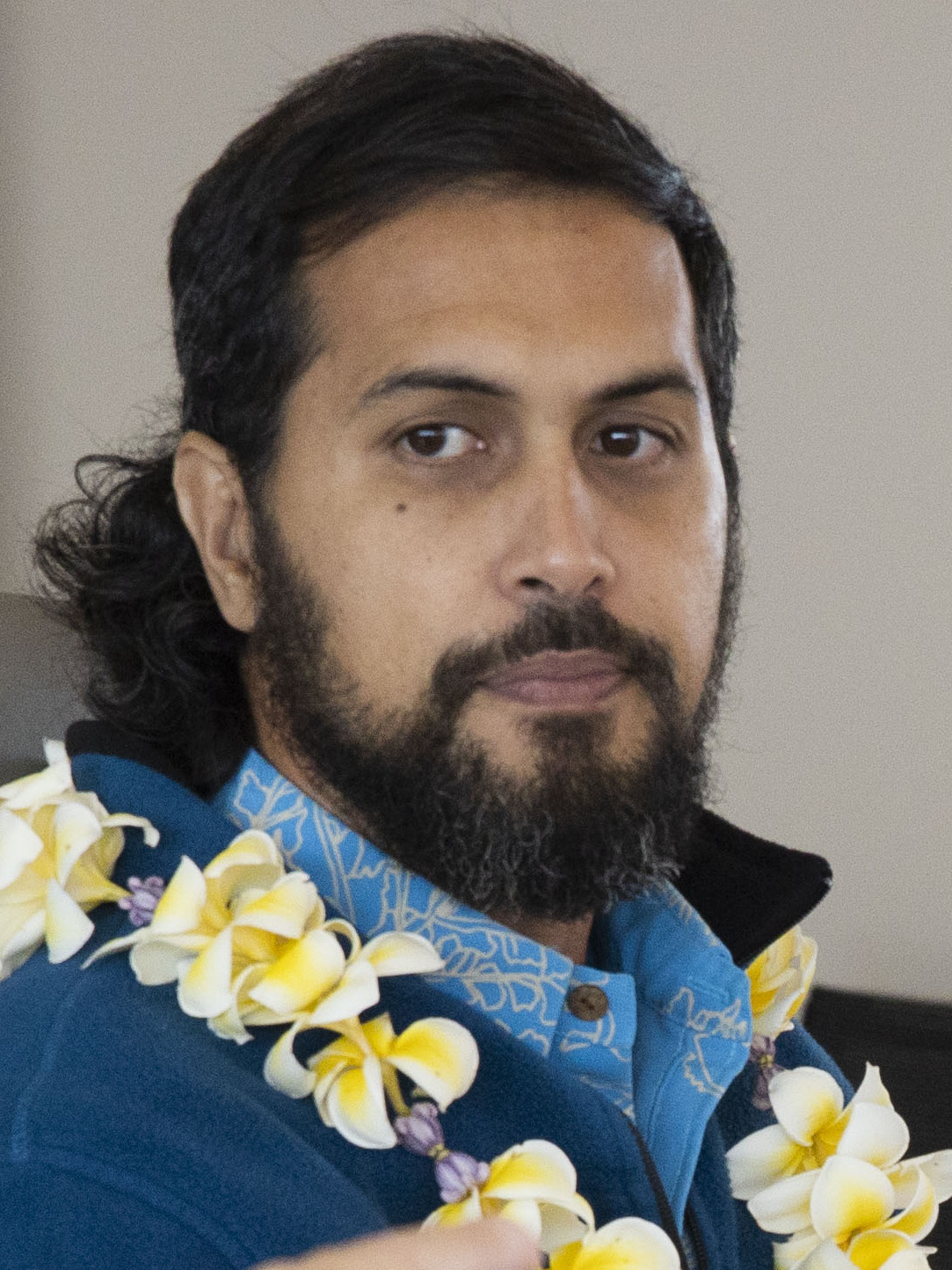
Nominee	Jill Tokuda	Brenton Awa
Party	Democratic	Republican
Popular vote	129,931	65,441
Percentage	66.5%	33.5%
U.S. Representative before election
Jill Tokuda
Democratic
Elected U.S. Representative
Jill Tokuda
Democratic

The 2nd district includes rural and suburban Oahu, including Waimanalo Beach, Kailua, Kaneohe, Kahuku, Makaha, Nanakuli, and all the other islands of Hawaii, including Hawaii, Kalawao, Kauaʻi, and Maui Counties. The incumbent is Democrat Jill Tokuda, who was reelected with 66.5% of the vote in 2024.

=== Democratic primary ===
==== Candidates ====
===== Nominee =====
- Jill Tokuda, incumbent U.S. representative

===== Eliminated in primary =====
- Kirill Basin
- Greg Guithues, veteran and technology consultant
- Steven King, retired teacher

==== Endorsements ====
Jill Tokuda

Statewide officials

- David Ige, former governor of Hawaii (2014–2022)

Labor unions

- American Federation of Government Employees
- National Education Association

Organizations

- College Democrats of America
- End Citizens United
- J Street
- National Women's Political Caucus
- Planned Parenthood Action Fund
- Vote Mama

==== Fundraising ====
Campaign finance reports as of July 19, 2026
Candidate	Raised	Spent	Cash on hand
Jill Tokuda (D)	$820,678	$733,764	$570,355
Source: Federal Election Commission

==== Results ====
Democratic primary results
Party	Candidate	Votes	%
Democratic	Jill Tokuda (incumbent)	92,075	91.5
Democratic	Steven King	3,917	3.9
Democratic	Greg Guithues	3,160	3.1
Democratic	Kirill Basin	1,530	1.5
Total votes		100,682	100.0

=== Republican primary ===
==== Candidates ====
===== Nominee =====
- Brenton Awa, minority leader of the Hawaii Senate (2024–present) from the 23rd district (2022–present)

==== Fundraising ====
Campaign finance reports as of July 19, 2026
Candidate	Raised	Spent	Cash on hand
Brenton Awa (R)	$122,615	$106,514	$16,101
Source: Federal Election Commission

Republican primary results
Party	Candidate	Votes	%
Republican	Brenton Awa	26,290	100.0
Total votes		26,290	100.0

=== Independents ===
==== Candidates ====
===== Did not qualify =====
- Edward Codelia, realtor and candidate for Maui county council in 2024
- Randall Terry, anti-abortion activist, Constitution Party nominee for president in 2024, and perennial candidate

=== General election ===
==== Predictions ====
Source	Ranking	As of
Decision Desk HQ	Safe D	July 14, 2026
The Cook Political Report	Solid D	February 6, 2025
Inside Elections	Solid D	March 7, 2025
Sabato's Crystal Ball	Safe D	July 15, 2025
Silver Bulletin	Solid D	August 20, 2026

== Notes ==
Partisan clients
