= Brenton Awa =

American politician (born 1986)

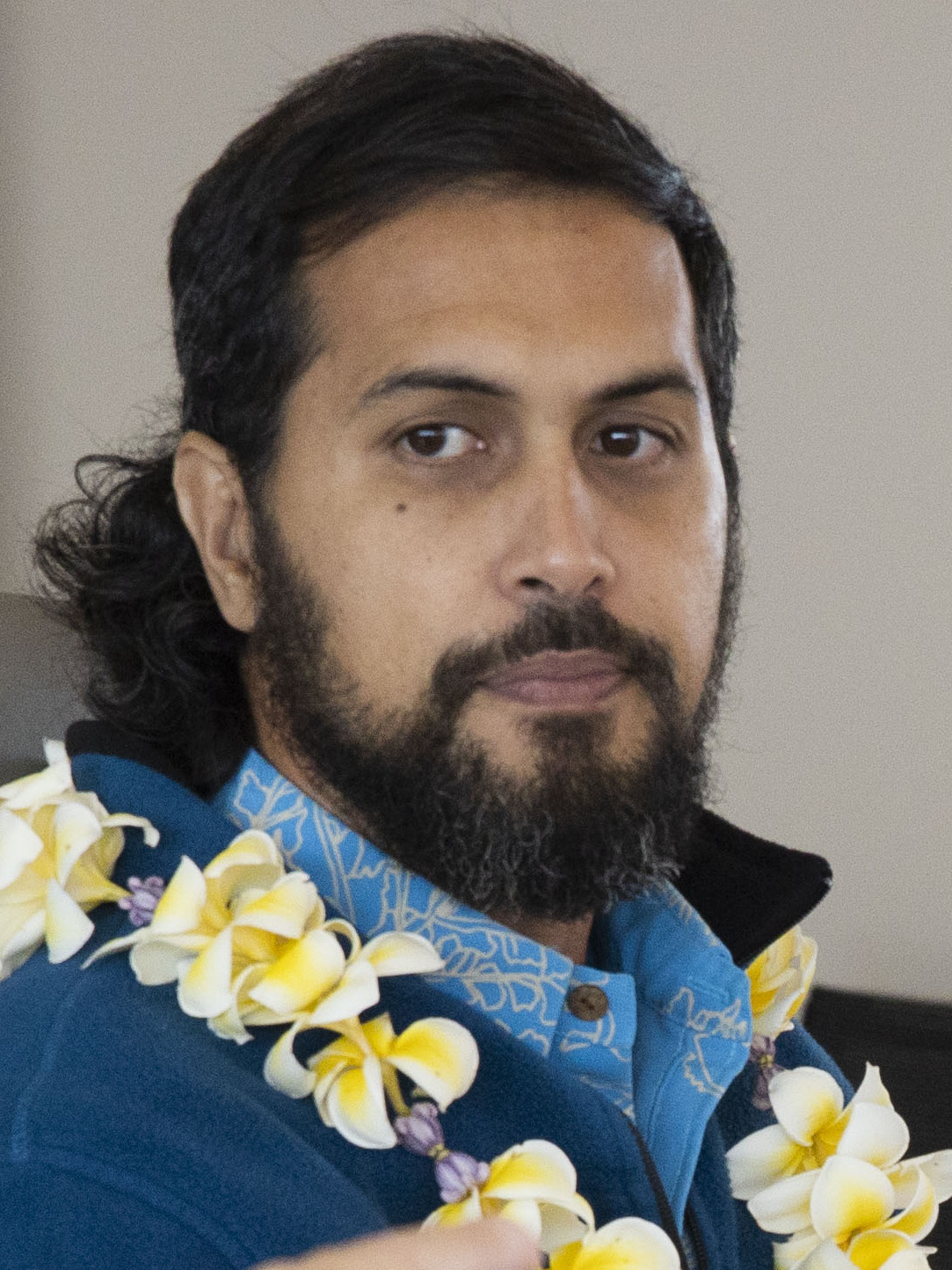
- Awa in 2023

Minority Leader of the Hawaii Senate
- In office November 8, 2024 – November 9, 2026
- Preceded by: Kurt Fevella
- Succeeded by: Samantha DeCorte

Member of the Hawaii Senate from the 23rd district
- Incumbent
- Assumed office November 8, 2022
- Preceded by: Gil Riviere

Personal details
- Born: February 19, 1986 (age 40) Kaʻaʻawa, Hawaii, U.S.
- Party: Republican (before 2026); Independent (after 2026)
- Education: Clarion University (BA)

Brenton Patrick Chokei Kawika Awa (born February 19, 1986) is an American politician and former television news anchor. Initially elected as a Republican in 2022, Awa is a political Independent.

Awa has represented the 23rd district in the Hawaii Senate since 2022, which includes the communities of Kāne‘ohe, Kahalu‘u thru Lā‘ie, Kahuku to Mokulē‘ia, Schofield Barracks, and Kunia Camp on the island of O'ahu. He served as the Minority Leader of the Hawaii Senate from 2024 to 2026.

Awa was the Republican nominee for Hawaii's 2nd congressional district in the 2026 U.S. House elections, challenging Democratic incumbent nominee Jill Tokuda. On November 6, 2026, following his loss to Tokuda, Awa resigned from the Republican party.

== Early life and education ==
Awa was born in Kaʻaʻawa and raised in Kahalu'u on the island of O'ahu. He graduated from Kahuku High & Intermediate School in 2004. He graduated from Pennsylvania Western University – Clarion (formerly Clarion University of Pennsylvania) with a degree in speech communication and leadership.

Awa wrestled during his time at Kahuku and PennWest Clarion. In 2008, Awa briefly coached Kahuku's junior varsity wrestling team, which won the Oahu Interscholastic Association championship.

== Career ==
=== Media career ===
In January 2009, Awa began his career in television news for KGMB9 News in Honolulu. Awa would begin as an intern, transitioning into roles of an associate producer and video journalist. In 2015, KITV hired Awa as a reporter, where he would be promoted to morning anchor and eventually evening anchor.

Awa was fired from KITV in July 2021 after punching a door in the newsroom, which he claims was due to an order that went against the fundamental ethics of journalism. Awa sued the station over his firing. He then worked as a substitute teacher at Kahuku High School.

=== Political career ===
Awa was first elected to the Hawaii Senate in November 2022, defeating incumbent Democrat Gil Riviere. Leading up to the 2024 election, Awa pledged not to campaign or accept donations. Awa was narrowly re-elected in November 2024, becoming the Senate minority leader.

During his first term, Awa introduced a bill to bar non-United States citizens from purchasing land in Hawaii to allow local residents to deal with the state's housing crisis. Concerns were raised about the legality of the bill and whether it may violate the Constitution.

In 2023, Awa worked with the state and the United States Army to fix a longstanding water leak on the North Shore of Oahu. He established a side-of-the-road fruit tree project in his hometown of Kahalu'u by planting ʻulu and mountain apple trees for public use and consumption. He established a similar project in Haleʻiwa to restore coconut tree populations and eradicate invasive coconut rhinoceros beetles.

Awa was also contacted to organize a public homecoming concert for former Kahuku resident Iam Tongi, who won American Idol's 21st season. During his first term as a senator, Awa cast more than 1,000 nay votes, being the sole nay on 10 percent of all bills passed during that time.

On March 8, 2023, an incident occurred at a virtual Kahalu'u Neighborhood Board meeting on banning commercial aquarium fishing where Awa said that Native Hawaiian cultural leader, Leialoha Rocky Kaluhiwa, "would have been hung” for criticizing his vote against the ban. Awa has said he has no intention to apologize following criticism.

The Hawaiʻi State Ethics Commission alleged in late 2024 that Awa violated the State Ethics Code's Fair Treatment Law following a video posted on his official Instagram account. The Commission claimed that Awa used taxpayer-funded facilities, platforms, and office time to show support for Samantha DeCorte, his then-office manager, following public complaints. They cited the ending of the video as promotion for DeCorte:

Getting Sam in as Waianae Senator would unlock our full potential in both communities to represent not just there, but represent the entire State of Hawaii. You guys know what to do. Aloha.

Awa claimed that the video was a farewell for DeCorte that highlighted her contributions to his office's work and her reasons for departing. He was fined in late 2025 following a final ruling by the Commission.

Awa gained media popularity following his response to a video of a tourist being beaten after throwing a rock at an endangered Hawaiian monk seal on Maui. In a speech during a committee hearing, Awa presented a letter of recognition to the man who beat the tourist, whom he kept anonymous. Awa nicknamed him the "Ambassador of Aloha," and suggested having the video be shown on flights to the state.

Awa became the Republican nominee for Hawaii's 2nd congressional district in the 2026 U.S. House elections, running unopposed in the Republican primary election.

== See also ==
- List of American politicians who switched parties in office

Hawaii Senate
Preceded by Kurt Fevella	Minority Leader of the Hawaii Senate; 2024–present	Incumbent
