= Samantha DeCorte =

American politician

- DeCorte in 2025 at Makua Valley

Minority Leader of the Hawaii Senate
- Incumbent
- Assumed office November 9, 2026
- Preceded by: Brenton Awa

Member of the Hawaii Senate from the 22nd district
- Incumbent
- Assumed office November 5, 2024
- Preceded by: Cross Makani Crabbe

Personal details
- Born: 1979 or 1980 (age 46–47)
- Party: Republican

Samantha Momilani DeCorte (born 1979 or 1980) is an American politician serving as a member of the Hawaii Senate for the 22nd district, which includes Ko ‘Olina, Nānākuli, Mā‘ili, Wai‘anae, Mākaha and Mākua. A Republican, she was elected and assumed office on November 5, 2024.

In November 2026, following state senator Brenton Awa's departure from the Republican party, DeCorte assumed the role of Minority Leader.

== Career ==
In 2022, DeCorte ran for the state senate in the 22nd district and narrowly lost to the Democratic incumbent, Maile Shimabukuro, by just 40 votes. She ran again in 2024 and won by 1,134 votes, having defeated Democrat Cedric Gates.

DeCorte has worked at the Hawaii Department of Transportation and served as a community leader at Word of Life Christian Center.

== Personal life ==
DeCorte is Native Hawaiian. She grew up on Hawaiʻi Island, with her mother's family from Miloliʻi and her father's family from North Kohala.
