= Clayton Hee =

American politician

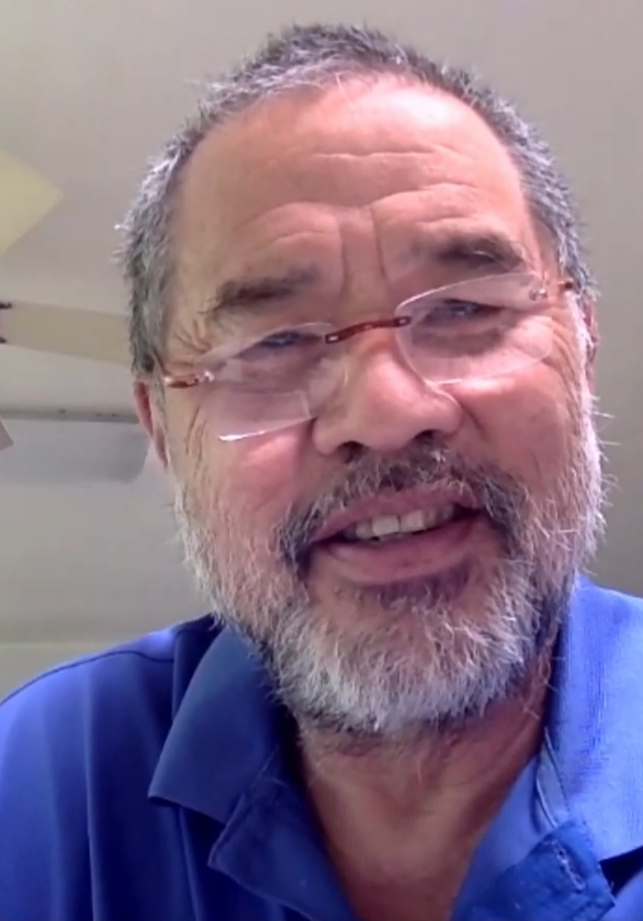

Member of the Hawaii Senate from the 23rd district
- In office 2004–2014
- Preceded by: Melodie Aduja
- Succeeded by: Gil Riviere
- In office 1984–1988

Member of the Office of Hawaiian Affairs Board of Trustees
- In office 1990–2002
- Constituency: O'ahu

Member of the Hawaii House of Representatives from the 9th district
- In office 1982–1984
- Succeeded by: Joseph Souki

Personal details
- Born: March 14, 1953 (age 73) Saint Croix, U.S. Virgin Islands
- Party: Democratic
- Spouse: Lynne Waters
- Children: 1 son
- Education: University of Hawaiʻi
- Profession: Educator, businessowner and consultant

Clayton H. W. Hee is a former Democratic Party member of the Hawaii Senate who represented the 23rd District from 2004 to 2014 and 1984 to 1988. Hee served as chairman of the state senate's Judiciary and Labor Committee. Hee served as an Office of Hawaiian Affairs trustee from 1990 to 2002.

== Personal life and education ==
Hee is half Chinese and half Native Hawaiian. He can speak Hawaiian fluently. Hee is married to Lynne Waters and has a brother, Albert Hee. He was once married to former representative Lyla Berg.

After graduating from Kamehameha Schools and the University of Hawaiʻi, Hee taught at community colleges and high schools from 1975 to 1981.

== Political career ==
Hee served as state representative from 1982 to 1984 for the district encompassing Molokai, Lanai, and West Maui. From 1984 until 1988, Hee served as the state senator for the district encompassing Kailua to Kaneohe. He was also the chairman of the Judiciary Committee. In 1990, Hee began serving on the board of the Office of Hawaiian Affairs. In 2002, he stepped down from the board to run for lieutenant governor of Hawaii, losing in the Democratic primary to Matt Matsunaga. Hee ran successfully for the Hawaii state senate in 2004. Hee was an unsuccessful candidate for the United States House of Representatives in Hawaii's 2nd congressional district in 2006, finishing 4th in the Democratic primary behind Mazie Hirono, Colleen Hanabusa, and Matt Matsunaga.

In 2018, Hee campaigned for Governor of Hawaii but later withdrew his candidacy. In 2019, Hawaii governor David Ige appointed Hee to the Hawaii Paroling Authority.

In 2024, Hee announced he is running for the state senate once again, with the support of former governors Neil Abercrombie, Ben Cayetano, and John D. Waiheʻe III.
