= Cross Makani Crabbe =

American politician (born 1998)

Member of the Hawaii Senate from the 22nd district
- In office July 30, 2024 – November 5, 2024
- Appointed by: Josh Green
- Preceded by: Maile Shimabukuro
- Succeeded by: Samantha DeCorte

Personal details
- Born: August 12, 1998 (age 28)
- Party: Democratic
- Education: Seattle Pacific University
- Website: www.crossmakanicrabbe.com

Croccifixio "Cross" Makani Crabbe (born August 12, 1998) was a Democratic member of the Hawaii State Senate. He represented the state senate's 22nd district, which became vacant upon the resignation of Maile Shimabukuro in May 2024.

On July 30, 2024, Crabbe was appointed to the seat by Governor Josh Green. Crabbe served the remainder of his predecessor's term which ended on November 5, 2024.

== Career ==
Prior to elected office, Crabbe served as office manager for Representative Cedric Gates. He was also a case manager and facility monitor for Kealahou West Oahu and worked for various nonprofits. Crabbe was appointed to the Hawaii Senate by Governor Josh Green in July 2024 after Green previously stated that he would not appoint a successor prior to the primary election due to concerns on inappropriate election influence.
