= Gil Riviere =

American politician

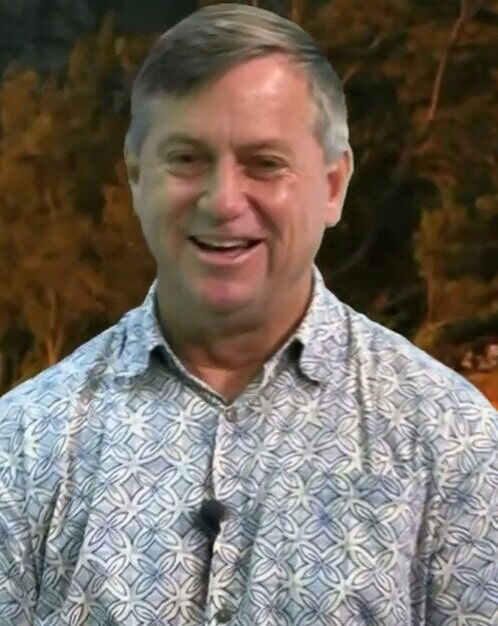

Member of the Hawaii Senate from the 23rd district
- In office January 2015 – November 8, 2022
- Preceded by: Clayton Hee
- Succeeded by: Brenton Awa

Personal details
- Born: Waialua, Hawaii, U.S.
- Party: Democratic
- Other political affiliations: Republican (formerly)

Gil Riviere is an American politician who served as a Democratic member of the Hawaii Senate for the 23rd district from 2015 to 2023. He previously served as a Republican representative from Hawaii's 46th district.

== Elections ==
=== Hawaii House of Representatives elections ===
Riviere won the November 2, 2010 general election for Representative from Hawaii's District 46 against Larry Sagaysay with 54.2% of the vote. He was unopposed in the Republican primary for the office. Riviere ran in the 2012 Republican primary for Representative of Hawaii's District 47, and was defeated by Richard Fale on August 11, 2012 with 47.2% of the vote.

=== Hawaii State Senate elections ===
Riviere won the November 4th, 2014 general election for Senator to represent Hawaii's District 23 against Richard Fale, his primary opponent who won in the 2012 election for Representative of Hawaii's District 47. Riviere won with 52.3% of the vote.

Riviere ran unopposed in the November 6th, 2018 general election for Senator of Hawaii's District 23. He was challenged by Clayton Hee in the Democratic primary for the seat, but won with 66.8% of the vote.
