= Walter A. Dods Jr. =

American businessman and banker

- Education: University of Hawaiʻi
- Occupations: Business executive, banker, philanthropist

Walter A. Dods Jr. is an American executive, banker and philanthropist. He is past Chairman of Hawaiian Telcom and Alexander & Baldwin as well as past President of the American Bankers Association. He is the Chairman of Matson, Inc.

== Biography ==
=== Early life ===
Walter A. Dods Jr. was educated at the St. Louis High School in Honolulu. He graduated from the University of Hawaiʻi, where he received a Bachelor of Business Administration.

=== Career ===
Before attending college, Dods Jr. worked as a "dead files clerk" for First Insurance Company. Early on, he joined the Jaycees.

He was Chief Executive Officer, President and Chairman of BancWest, a subsidiary of BNP Paribas. He then was Chairman of the First Hawaiian Bank, a subsidiary of BancWest (and CEO from 1989 to 2004). He was Chairman of Hawaiian Telcom and Alexander & Baldwin.

He was on the boards of directors of the First Insurance Company of Hawaii, the Grace Pacific Corporation, the Maui Land & Pineapple Company, Mid Pac Petroleum, the Pacific Guardian Life Insurance Co., and Servco Pacific. In 2015, he was named director of Par Petroleum Corporation.

He is past president of the American Bankers Association. He also was on the Federal Advisory Council of the United States Federal Reserve System, representing the 12th district of the Federal Reserve from 1999 to 2000. He is a Trustee of the Estate of Samuel Mills Damon.

He has been the Chairman of the Board of Matson since June 2012.

=== Philanthropy ===
He is on the board of trustees of the Honolulu Museum of Art and the Japan-America Institute of Management Science (JAIMS). Additionally, he sits on the board of governors of the Chaminade University of Honolulu, and on the board of advisors for Catholic Charities Hawaii and the University of Hawaii School of Social Work.

He and his wife created the UH scholarship fund for immigrant students. In 2023, he made a $5-million donation to the new Residences for Innovative Student Entrepreneurs (RISE) of the University of Hawaiʻi at Mānoa. The building was renamed Walter Dods Jr. RISE Center in his honor.

== Published work ==
- Dods Jr., Walter A.; Keir, Gerry; Burris, Burris (11 December 2015). Yes! A Memoir of Modern Hawaii. Legacy Isle Publishing. ISBN 978-1935690764.
