= Kahaluʻu, Hawaii =

Census-designated place in Hawaiʻi, United States

Kahaluʻu
- Census-designated place
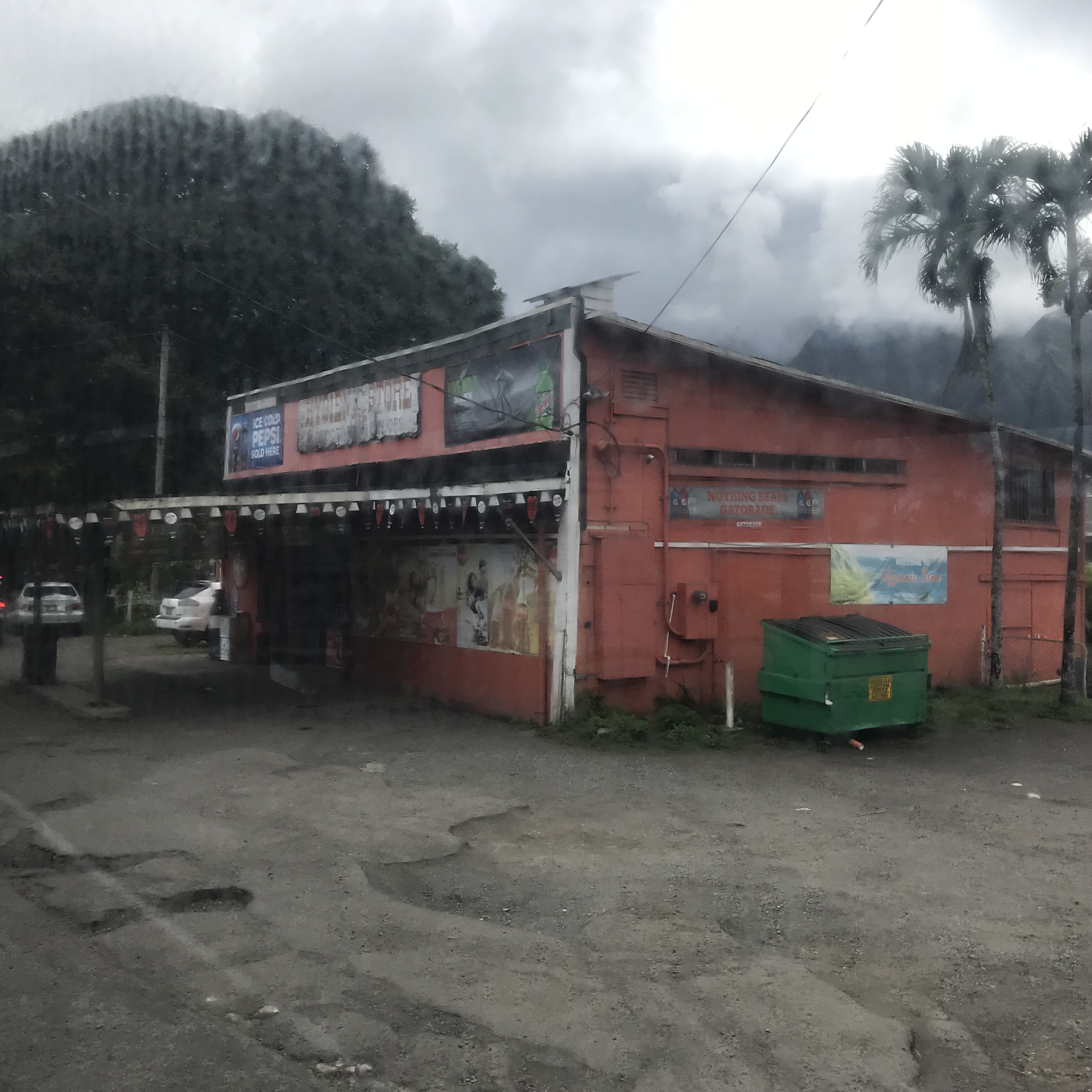
- The Hygienic Store, a well-known landmark in Kahaluu

- Location in Honolulu County and the state of Hawaii
- Coordinates: 21°27′40″N 157°50′28″W
- Country: United States
- State: Hawaiʻi

Area
  - Total: 4.53 sq mi (11.72 km^{2})
  - Land: 3.48 sq mi (9.02 km^{2})
  - Water: 1.04 sq mi (2.70 km^{2})
- Elevation: 7 ft (2.1 m)

Population (2020)
  - Total: 5,241
  - Density: 1,505.5/sq mi (581.27/km^{2})
- Time zone: UTC-10 (Hawaii-Aleutian)
- ZIP code: 96744
- Area code: 808
- FIPS code: 15-21200
- GNIS feature ID: 0359686

Kahaluʻu (/ˌkɑːhəˈluːʔuː/; Hawaiian pronunciation: [ˈkɐhɐˈluʔu]) is a residential community and census-designated place (CDP) in the City and County of Honolulu, Hawaii, United States, in the District of Koolaupoko on the island of Oahu. In Hawaiian kaha luʻu means "diving place". As of the 2020 census, the CDP had a total population of 5,241.

== Overview ==
At Kahaluʻu, visitors to the windward side travelling via the Pali Highway, H-3, or Likelike Highway first encounter the ocean (actually Kaneohe Bay) close to the highway (Kamehameha Highway or Route 83). Kahaluʻu is a mostly rural area transforming into a denser residential community.

The U.S. postal code for Kahaluʻu is 96744.

A well-known landmark in Kahaluʻu is The Hygienic Store, which was the store of the largest dairy in Hawaii in the early 1900s.

Hamama falls, located at end of Waihe'e road on Board of Water Supply property, was a moderate hike with beautiful views of the Ko'olau mountains. The hike featured a cold body of water referred to as an "ice pond" and ended with a waterfall. It used to be a relatively unbusy hike, but gained popularity in the 2010s and eventually became closed off to the public due to overcrowding.

== Geography ==
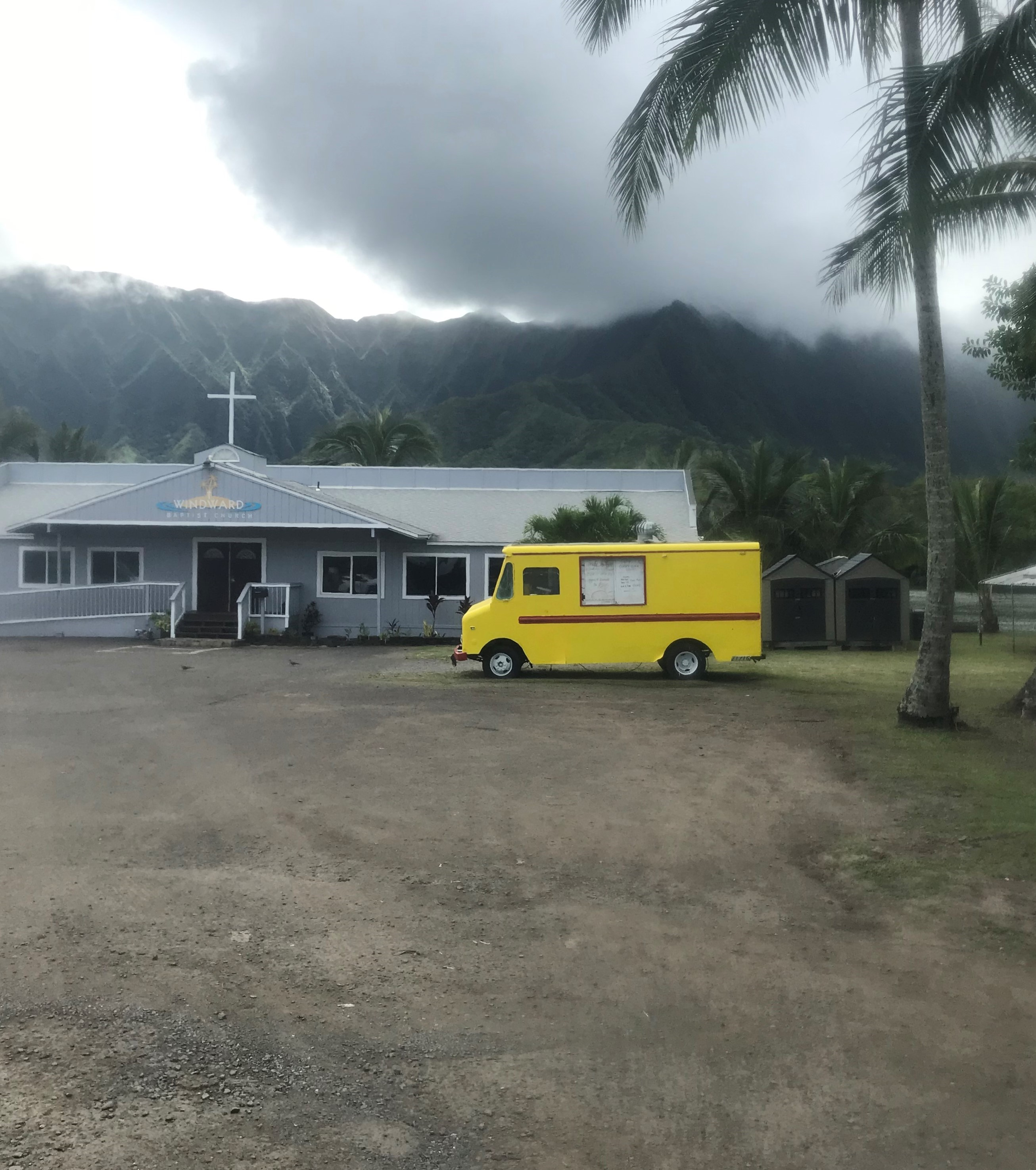
Windward Baptist Church on Kamehameha Hwy. in Kahaluʻu

Kahaluʻu is located at 21°27′40″N 157°50′28″W (21.461146, -157.841155). It is directly adjacent to Ahuimanu to the south and Waiahole to the north.

According to the United States Census Bureau, the CDP has a total area of 4.5 square miles (11.7 km^{2}), of which 3.5 square miles (9.0 km^{2}) is land and 1.0 square mile (2.7 km^{2}) is water. The total area is 23.07% water.

== Demographics ==
Historical population
| Census | Pop. | Note | %± |
|---|---|---|---|
| 2020 | 5,241 | | — |
U.S. Decennial Census

As of the census of 2000, there were 2,935 people, 927 households, and 716 families residing in the CDP. The population density was 2,410.8 inhabitants per square mile (930.8/km^{2}). There were 980 housing units at an average density of 805.0 per square mile (310.8/km^{2}). The racial makeup of the CDP was 26.85% White, 0.37% Black or African American, 0.07% Native American, 22.18% Asian, 17.51% Pacific Islander, 0.99% from other races, and 32.03% from two or more races. Hispanic or Latino of any race were 6.81% of the population.

There were 927 households, out of which 31.8% had children under the age of 18 living with them, 54.7% were married couples living together, 15.7% had a female householder with no husband present, and 22.7% were non-families. 13.5% of all households were made up of individuals, and 3.7% had someone living alone who was 65 years of age or older. The average household size was 3.17 and the average family size was 3.50.

In the CDP the population was spread out, with 25.3% under the age of 18, 8.2% from 18 to 24, 27.5% from 25 to 44, 27.8% from 45 to 64, and 11.1% who were 65 years of age or older. The median age was 38 years. For every 100 females, there were 102.0 males. For every 100 females age 18 and over, there were 96.9 males.

The median income for a household in the CDP was $61,098, and the median income for a family was $61,184. Males had a median income of $41,310 versus $28,194 for females. The per capita income for the CDP was $22,204. About 7.4% of families and 7.4% of the population were below the poverty line, including 6.7% of those under the age of 18 and 3.0% of those 65 and older.

== Education ==
Hawaii Department of Education operates Kahaluʻu Elementary School.

== Notable residents ==
- Chris McKinney (b. 1973), writer
- Hiram Fong (1906-2004), politician and senator who ran for president in 1964.
- Katherine Kealoha, Former Honolulu Deputy City Prosecutor
- Kalei Mau, Fil-Hawaiian volleyball player
