= Angus McKelvey =

American politician

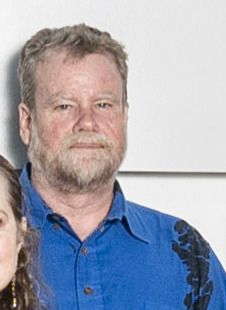
- McKelvey in 2024

Member of the Hawaii Senate from the 6th district
- Incumbent
- Assumed office November 8, 2022
- Preceded by: Rosalyn Baker

Member of the Hawaii House of Representatives from the 10th district
- In office November 7, 2006 – November 8, 2022
- Preceded by: Kameo Tanaka
- Succeeded by: Elle Cochran

Personal details
- Born: March 9, 1968 (age 58) Honolulu, Hawaii, U.S.
- Party: Democratic
- Education: Whittier College; Concord Law School

Angus L.K. McKelvey (born in 1968 in Honolulu, Hawaii) is an American politician and a Democratic member of the Hawaii State Senate since November 2022 representing District 6. He previously served in the Hawaii House of Representatives from 2006 to 2022 representing District 10.

== Education ==
McKelvey earned his BA in political science from Whittier College and his JD from Concord Law School.

== Elections ==
- 2012 McKelvey won the August 11, 2012 Democratic Primary with 1,329 votes (66.8%), and won the November 6, 2012 General election with 4,255 votes (63.9%) against Republican nominee Chayne Marten.
- 2006 Challenging incumbent Democratic Representative Kam Tanaka for the District 10 seat, McKelvey won the September 26, 2006 Democratic Primary with 1,360 votes (59.3%), and won the November 7, 2006 General election with 2,623 votes (54.4%) against Republican nominee Ben Azman, who had run for Hawaii Senate in 2002.
- 2008 McKelvey was unopposed for the September 20, 2008 Democratic Primary, winning with 1,286 votes, and won the November 4, 2008 General election with 4,477 votes (60.8%) against Republican nominee Ramon Madden.
- 2010 McKelvey was unopposed for the September 18, 2010 Democratic Primary, winning with 1,757 votes, and his 2008 opponent, Republican Ramon Madden, won the Republican Primary, setting up a rematch. McKelvey won the November 2, 2010 General election with 3,191 votes (61.0%) against Madden.
