= Tim Richards III =

American politician

Tim Richards
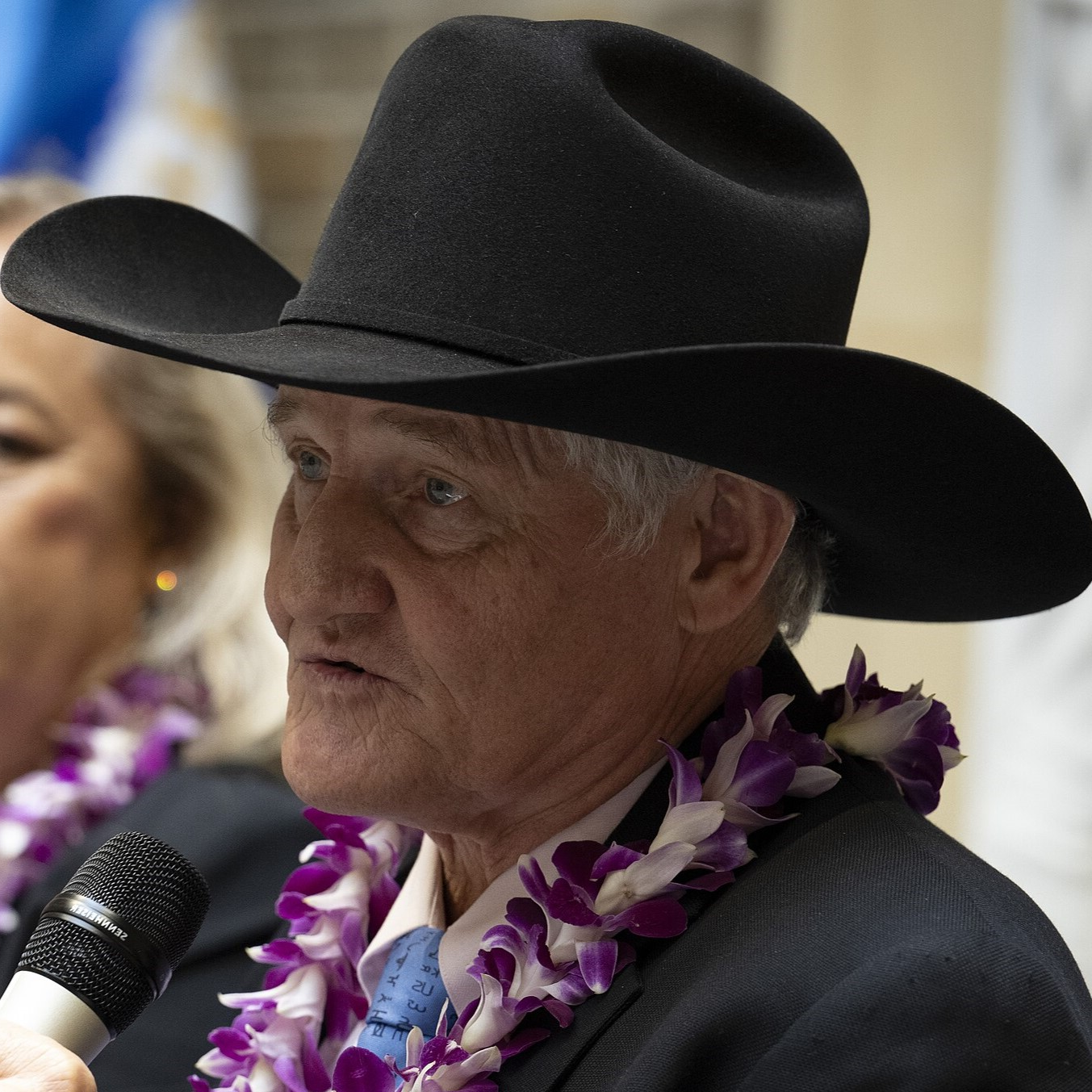
- Richards in 2024

Member of the Hawaii Senate from the 4th district
- Incumbent
- Assumed office November 8, 2022
- Preceded by: Redistricted

Personal details
- Born: 1958 or 1959 (age 67–68) North Kohala, Hawaii, U.S.
- Party: Democratic
- Education: Washington State University

Herbert Montague (Tim) Richards III is an American politician serving as a member of the Hawaii Senate for the 4th district. He was elected to office on November 8, 2022.

== Early life and education ==
Richards was born in Kohala, Hawaii and attended Hawaii Preparatory Academy. He attended college at Washington State University, earning his Bachelor of Science in 1981 and Doctorate of Veterinary Medicine in 1984.

== Career ==
Prior to entering politics, Richards was a veterinarian for Veterinary Associates and rancher at Kahua Ranch.

=== Elected office ===
Richards served on the Hawaii County Council from 2015 to 2022 for the district 9 seat. He worked on agricultural policy and food security and has served on an advisory group of the U.S. Department of Agriculture.

He was elected to the Hawaii Senate in November 2022.
