= Sharon Moriwaki =

American politician (born 1945)

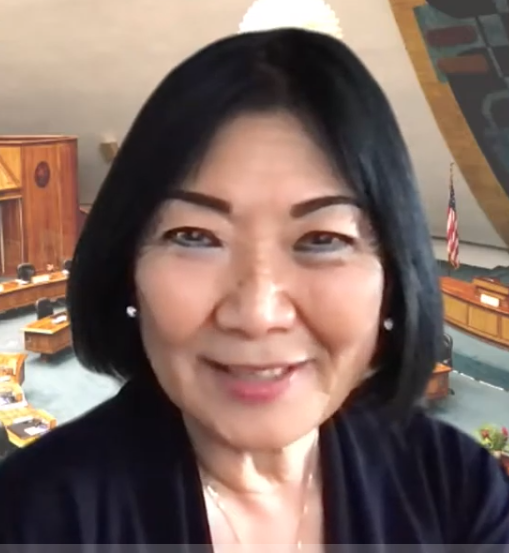

Member of the Hawaii Senate from the 12th district
- Incumbent
- Assumed office November 6, 2018
- Preceded by: Brickwood Galuteria

Personal details
- Born: December 29, 1945 (age 80) Honolulu, Hawaii
- Party: Democratic
- Spouse: Galen Fox
- Children: 3
- Education: University of Southern California; Loyola Law School
- Website: Senator Sharon Moriwaki

Sharon Yuriko Moriwaki (born December 29, 1945) is an American Democratic party politician from Hawaii. She is a state senator from Senate District 12.

== Early life and education ==
Moriwaki was born in Honolulu and attended Kaimuki High School, the University of Southern California, and Loyola Law School.

== Career ==
After graduating from law school, Moriwaki returned to Hawaii and worked at a private law firm. She then became the Labor Department's deputy director under Governor John Waihee. She went on to serve in several other government positions before being elected to office in 2018. She is a member of the Housing, Technology, and Ways and Means committees.
