= Maile Shimabukuro =

American politician (born 1970)

- Shimabukuro in 2015

Member of the Hawaii Senate
- In office December 2010 – May 31, 2024
- Appointed by: Neil Abercrombie
- Preceded by: Colleen Hanabusa
- Succeeded by: Cross Makani Crabbe
- Constituency: 21st district (2010–2022); 22nd district (2022–2024)

Member of the Hawaii House of Representatives from the 45th district
- In office 2002–2010
- Preceded by: Emily Auwae
- Succeeded by: Jo Jordan

Personal details
- Born: October 1, 1970 (age 55) Honolulu, Hawaii
- Party: Democratic
- Spouse: Shayne Sakoda
- Education: Colorado College; William S. Richardson School of Law
- Profession: Attorney

Maile Sun Lock Shimabukuro (born October 1, 1970) is an American attorney and former politician. A Democrat, she served as a member of the Hawaii State Senate representing the state's 21st district from 2010 to 2022 and the 22nd district from 2022 to 2024 after redistricting. The district included the communities of Kalaeloa, Honokai Hale, Ko ‘Olina, Nānākuli, Mā‘ili, Wai‘anae, Mākaha, and Mākua on the island of Oahu. She previously served in the Hawaii House of Representatives from 2002 to 2010 representing the 45th district.

== Early life and career ==
Shimabukuro is a graduate of Iolani School. After graduating from Colorado College in 1992, she worked as a paralegal at the Legal Aid Society of Hawaii for five years before obtaining a Juris Doctor from the William S. Richardson School of Law at University of Hawaiʻi at Mānoa and returning to the organization as a lawyer.

== Political career ==
In 2004, Shimabukuro was elected to the Hawaii House of Representatives in an upset, defeating Republican incumbent Emily Auwae with 60.88% of the vote.

On May 4, 2024, Shimabukuro announced she would resign from the Hawaii State Senate effective May 31st. After resigning, she returned to the Legal Aid Society of Hawaii representing low-income clients in civil matters.

=== Committees ===
State Senator, District 21 Leeward Coast (as of February 5, 2017)

- Chair, Hawaiian Affairs Committee
- Member, Ways & Means
- Member, Transportation & Energy
- Member, International Affairs & the Arts
- Member, Women's and Hawaiian Caucuses
- (Past) Vice Chair, Judiciary & Labor Committee
- (Past) Member, Water & Land Committee

State House Representative, District 45 Waianae/Makaha/Makua (01/2003-12/2010)

- Chair, Human Services & Housing Committee (2005-2006)
- Vice Chair, Hawaiian Affairs Committee (2009-2010)

== Personal life ==
In February 2003, Shimabukuro was involved in a car crash while driving toward Honolulu from Waianae. Her vehicle flipped over and landed in the Waianae-bound traffic lane. Shimabukuro was unharmed and credits her safety to the fact that she was wearing a seat belt at the time of the incident.
