= Jarrett Keohokalole =

American politician

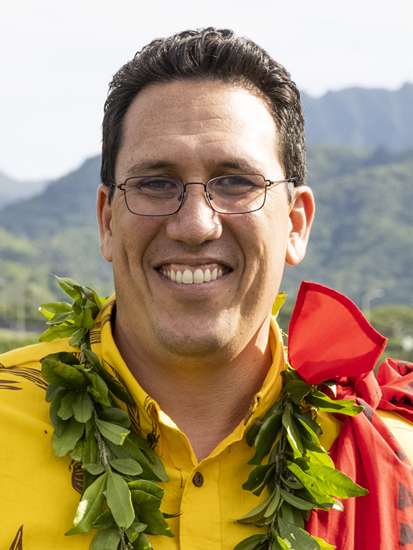
- Keohokalole in 2023

Member of the Hawaii Senate from the 24th district
- Incumbent
- Assumed office November 6, 2018
- Preceded by: Jill Tokuda

Member of the Hawaii House of Representatives from the 48th district
- In office November 4, 2014 – November 6, 2018
- Preceded by: George Okuda
- Succeeded by: Lisa Kitagawa

Personal details
- Born: August 7, 1983 (age 43) Kāneʻohe, Hawaii, U.S.
- Party: Democratic
- Education: University of Hawaiʻi at Mānoa (BA, JD)

Jarrett K. Keohokalole (born August 7, 1983) is an American legislator serving as a Democratic member of the Hawai‘i State Senate, representing Senate District 24 which includes Kāne‘ohe and Kailua. He previously served in the Hawai‘i State House of Representatives. He represented the 48th House District, which includes Kāne‘ohe, Kahalu‘u, and Waiāhole. Jarrett Keohokalole is a seventh-generation resident of Kāne‘ohe.

Keohokalole ran for U.S. Representative in the 2026 election for Hawaii's first congressional district. He lost to incumbent Ed Case in the Democratic primary.

== Early life and education ==
Keohokalole was born in Honolulu, Hawaiʻi. His father worked as a construction worker and his mother a registered nurse. He graduated from Saint Louis School in 2001, where he was an honor roll student and commander of the JROTC Battalion. He earned a Bachelor of Arts in Journalism from the University of Hawaiʻi at Mānoa.

In 2008, he moved with his future wife Ku`ulani to Brooklyn, New York. There he worked as a legal assistant to a public defender in the Manhattan Criminal Court, and as office staff at a public charter school in East New York.

In 2010, they moved back to Hawaii, where he attended the William S. Richardson School of Law at the University of Hawaiʻi at Mānoa. He earned his Juris Doctor degree in 2013, with a certificate in Native Hawaiian Law.

In 2026, he received the Distinguished Alumni Award from the College of Social Sciences School at the University of Hawaiʻi at Mānoa.

== Early career ==
Keohokalole served as a legal fellow working on invasive species law and policy for the Coordinating Group on Alien Pest Species (CGAPS). During that time, he also served as a member of the Kāneʻohe Neighborhood Board.

== Hawai‘i House of Representatives ==
Keohokalole was elected to the Hawai'i House of Representatives in 2014 and ran unopposed in the 2016 election. He served as the House Majority Policy Leader and Vice Chair of the Committee on Economic Development & Business and was a member of the Finance (FIN), Labor & Public Employment (LAB), and Public Safety (PBS) committees.

Hawai‘i House of Representatives, District 48 Democratic Party, 2014
CANDIDATE	VOTE%	VOTES
Jarrett Keohokalole (D)	54.8%	3,367
Robert Harris (D)	45.2%	2,782
Total Votes	6,149	

Hawai‘i House of Representatives, District 48, General Elections, 2014
CANDIDATE	VOTE%	VOTES
Jarrett Keohokalole (D)	57.8%	5, 443
Eldean L. Kukahiko (R)	39%	3,676
Kaimanu Takayama (LP)	2.1%	199
Kana Naipo (NP)	1.1%	103
Total Votes:	9, 421	

=== Environmental legislation ===
In 2015, Keohokalole introduced legislation to streamline the permitting process for the restoration of traditional Hawaiian fishpond (loko iʻa) which was signed into law by Governor David Ige as Act 230. Prior to the reform, obtaining the permits required for fishpond restoration could take up to a decade and cost tens of thousands of dollars, according to fishpond advocates. In 2018, he authored Act 117, which appropriated state matching funds establishing the Heʻeia National Estuarine Research Reserve (NERR) on Oʻahu - the first NERR in the nation covering an island ecosystem.

=== Housing ===
In 2016, Keohokalole supported a then-record $26 million in annual funding for the Department of Hawaiian Home Lands' (DHHL) operations, following the Nelson v. Hawaiian Homes Commission ruling. As House Majority Policy Leader in 2018, he worked on passage of Act 39, which appropriated a combined $570 million toward affordable housing development statewide through cash appropriations and tax exemptions, projected to support 25,000 housing units by 2030.

=== Technology and economic development ===
In 2017, Keohokalole worked with the Hawaii Technology Development Corporation (HTDC) to fund the Excelerator startup accelerator program, and supported passage of Act 38 and Act 39 (2017), which allowed University of Hawai'i researchers to commercialize their discoveries and authorized the university to run technology accelerator programs. He received the Hawaii Venture Capital Association's Startup Champion of the Year award in 2018.

From 2019 to 2023, he served on the State of Hawaiʻi's Information Technology Steering Committee (ITSC), established under HRS§27-43, to advise and work with the Chief Information Officer (CIO) of the Office of Enterprise Technology Services (ETS) in developing statewide information technology standards, policies, and strategic planning.

== Hawai‘i State Senate ==
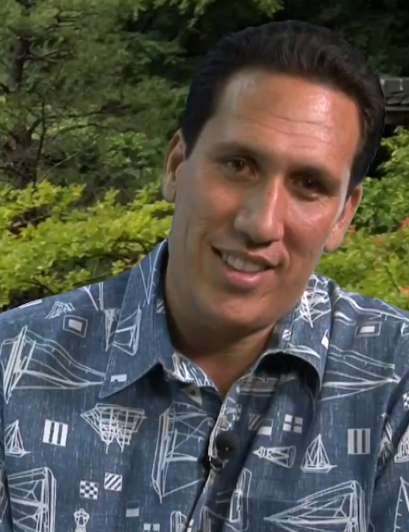
Keohokalole in 2018

Keohokalole was elected to serve the 24th Senate District on November 6, 2018. He currently serves as Assistant Majority Whip, Chair of the Committee on Commerce and Consumer Protection (CPN), Member of the Hawaiian Affairs (HWN) Committee, Member of the Committee on Health and Human Services (HHS), and former member of the Transportation and Culture and the Arts (TCA) committee. Keohokalole also serves as Chair of the Senate Native Hawaiian Caucus.

Hawaii State Senate, District 24 Democratic Party, 2018
Candidate	Vote %	Votes
Jarrett Keohokalole (D)	59.2%	7,840
Ken Ito (D)	40.8%	5,397
Total Votes	13,237	

He is also a current member of the Native Hawaiian Intellectual Property Working Group, and was a Commissioner for the 13th Festival of Pacific Arts and Culture (FestPac) that was held in Hawai‘i in 2024. He serves on the Board of Officers for the Association of Pacific Island Legislatures (APIL) as Treasurer, and is also a member of the Red Hill WAI Group.

=== Government and campaign-finance reform ===
During the pandemic, Keohokalole worked with legislative leadership to pilot remote committee hearings after the Hawai'i State Capitol closed in March 2020. The pilot preceded the 2021 legislative session being conducted entirely online, with hearings and floor sessions livestreamed and remote testimony opened statewide - a change political commentators contrasted with the legislature's previously limited public access.

In the 2026 legislative session, Keohokalole was a principal author and Senate co-introducer of SB2471, later enacted as Act 11. The bill amended state law governing the powers of corporations and other entities chartered under Hawai'i law to exclude spending on election or ballot-issue activity, an approach framed by supporters as working around Citizens United v. FEC by relying on the state's authority over the entities it creates rather than regulating speech directly. The measure passed the legislature by a vote of 74–1 on May 8, 2026, and was signed into law by Governor Josh Green on May 14, 2026. Keohokalole said the law "clarifies that those privileges do not include the power to spend corporate money to influence our elections. The Associated Press and other national outlets covered the law as among the first state-level challenges to Citizens United-era campaign spending rules; the law faced a legal challenge shortly after enactment.

During the same session, Keohokalole also authored SB2494, signed as Act225, which increased the statute of limitations for bribery offenses by a public servant in Hawai'i from three to nine years.

=== COVID-19 pandemic response ===
Keohokalole served on the Senate Special Committee on COVID-19 in 2020, participating in oversight hearings on testing, quarantine, and public health protocols. As chair of the Senate Health Committee beginning in 2021, he worked on deployment of vaccine and testing sites in rural communities. As chair of the Senate Native Hawaiian Caucus, he also advocated for vaccination and mask-wearing among Native Hawaiians, a group that experienced comparatively high COVID-19 infection rates alongside lower vaccination rates statewide. In 2021, the Healthcare Association of Hawai'i named him its Peer Award winner for Legislator of the Year.

=== Native Hawaiian Caucus leadership ===
Keohokalole has chaired the Senate Native Hawaiian Caucus since entering the Senate in 2019. In 2022, the caucus advocated for a package of Native Hawaiian funding measures - described by the Honolulu Star-Advertiser as a historic expansion of state support for Native Hawaiian programs - that included a $600 million appropriation to the Department of Hawaiian Home Lands for homestead development and mortgage and rent assistance, a $328 million settlement of Kalima v. State of Hawaii over the state's administration of the homesteading program, an increase in the state's ceded-land revenue payment to the Office of Hawaiian Affairs, and funding for the Bishop Museum, ʻIolani Palace, and Hawaiian-language immersion education, along with legislation authorizing water cremation as a Native Hawaiian burial practice. At a press conference the day before the session's adjournment, Keohokalole called it "the most consequential legislative session in 100 years.”

=== Insurance reform ===
Following the 2023 Maui wildfires, Keohokalole convened a field briefing of the Senate Commerce and Consumer Protection Committee in Lahaina to take public testimony on wildfire-related insurance claims - only the second time in 15 years a Senate committee had convened on a neighbor island. In the 2025 legislative session, he introduced SB1044, enacted as Act 296, which reactivated the Hawaii Hurricane Relief Fund (HHRF) to help stabilize the state's property insurance market. As of April 2026, the HHRF has issued 97 insurance policies representing approximately $2.7 million in written premiums; and has contributed to more than $12 million in total savings statewide since its inception.

=== Sustainable economy and tourism ===
In 2024, Keohokalole introduced SB2659, enacted as Act 128, which incorporated a regenerative tourism framework into the Hawai'i State Planning Act. That year he also authored legislation expanding county authority to regulate and phase out short-term vacation rentals in residential zones.

=== Health and mental health ===
Keohokalole received the Government Leadership Award from Hina Mauka in 2025 for his work on addiction, mental illness, homelessness, and chronic illness. In 2022, he sponsored a $4 million appropriation to the University of Hawai'i's John A. Burns School of Medicine to expand medical residency and training opportunities in partnership with the U.S. Department of Veterans Affairs, aimed at increasing the number of licensed physicians in the state.

He also helped establish a Mental Health Technician Certificate of Competence program at Windward Community College, and in 2019 introduced legislation establishing a Hawai'i State Department of Health working group to coordinate services for people with substance-use disorders, mental health conditions, or experiencing homelessness.

==== Reproductive health care protections ====
Following the U.S. Supreme Court's 2022 decision in Dobbs v. Jackson Women's Health Organization, Keohokalole worked on the passage of SB1, enacted as Act 2 of 2023, which expanded protections for reproductive health patients and providers in Hawai'i. He worked with Planned Parenthood, Hawai'i Women Lawyers, and the Women's Legislative Caucus in support of the bill.

=== Environmental advocacy and invasive species policy ===
Keohokalole received the Conservation Council for Hawai'i's 2025 Koa Award for Excellence in Conservation.

==== Invasive species ====
In the 2026 session, Keohokalole introduced SB2760, which would authorize the Hawai'i Department of Agriculture and Biosecurity (DAB) to inspect non-agricultural goods for pests or disease and fine violators, and SB2779, addressing the impact of coconut rhinoceros beetles on the state's coconut palm population. Under Act 231 (2024), DAB received $10 million for invasive pest management, inspection and quarantine facilities, staffing, and rapid-response programs, which also funded homeowner treatment programs for little fire ant infestations. After little fire ants were identified in Lanikai, Oʻahu, in 2019, Keohokalole pressed state agencies on the response, and later facilitated an interagency memorandum of understanding among DAB, the Department of Land and Natural Resources, and the University of Hawai'i on pest prevention and rapid response.

==== Red Hill ====
Following the 2021 fuel leaks at the Red Hill Underground Fuel Storage Facility, Keohokalole authored Act 157 (2022), which bars the state Department of Health from permitting underground fuel storage tanks within half a mile of an aquifer. He also served on the Red Hill Water Alliance Initiative (Red Hill WAI), a state and City and County of Honolulu working group - which included Governor Josh Green - that worked with the U.S. Department of Defense on remediation research and monitoring.

==== Technology Policy ====
In 2026, Keohokalole introduced SB3001, the Artificial Intelligence Disclosure and Safety Act, establishing disclosure and safety requirements for AI companion services, and worked on HB2137, regulating AI-generated deepfakes and synthetic media. Together, the measures established Hawaiʻi’s first comprehensive statutory framework governing artificial intelligence and addressed emerging issues involving AI transparency, digital likenesses, and synthetic content.

== Leadership in regional and cultural diplomacy ==
In 2024, Keohokalole served as a commissioner for the 13th Festival of Pacific Arts and Culture (FESTPAC) in Honolulu where delegates representing 27 Pacific Island nations gathered for a 10-day celebration of regional unity and cultural preservation. During this time, Keohokalole helped convene the Osiana Traditional Leaders Forum and signed the Tuurama Ariki Declaration, on June 11, 2024, at ʻIolani Palace. The Tuurama Ariki Declaration is a pact among traditional Pacific leaders to revive a unified regional voice to confront shared challenges, including climate change and Indigenous rights.

Also that year, Keohokalole also represented the State of Hawaiʻi as a delegate of the Pacific Islands Parliaments Group (PIPG), and served on the Association of Pacific Island Legislatures (APIL) Board as Treasurer for the 2024–2025 term.

== Personal life ==
In 2010, Keohokalole married Kāneʻohe resident Kuʻulani Miyashiro Keohokalole. The couple met while attending the University of Hawaiʻi at Mānoa as undergraduates, where they served together as New Student Orientation leaders for incoming freshman students. Together, they have three children and a dog.
