= Hawaii Senate =

Upper house of the Hawaii State Legislature

Coordinates: 21.3073°N 157.8573°W

Hawaii State Senate Ka ʻAha Kenekoa
- 33rd Hawaii State Legislature

Type
- Type: Upper house
- Term limits: None

History
- New session started: January 20, 2021

Leadership
- President: Ron Kouchi (D) since May 5, 2015
- Vice President: Lorraine Inouye (D) since September 1, 2026
- Majority Leader: Dru Kanuha (D) since May 5, 2021
- Minority Leader: Samantha DeCorte (R) since November 9, 2026

Structure
- Seats: 25
- Political groups: Majority: Democratic (22); Minority: Republican (2); Independent (1)
- Length of term: 4 years
- Authority: Article III, Constitution of Hawaii
- Salary: $74,160 per year + $225 per diem for non-Oʻahu members (2025)

Elections
- Last election: November 3, 2026
- Next election: November 7, 2028
- Redistricting: Hawaii Reapportionment Commission

Meeting place
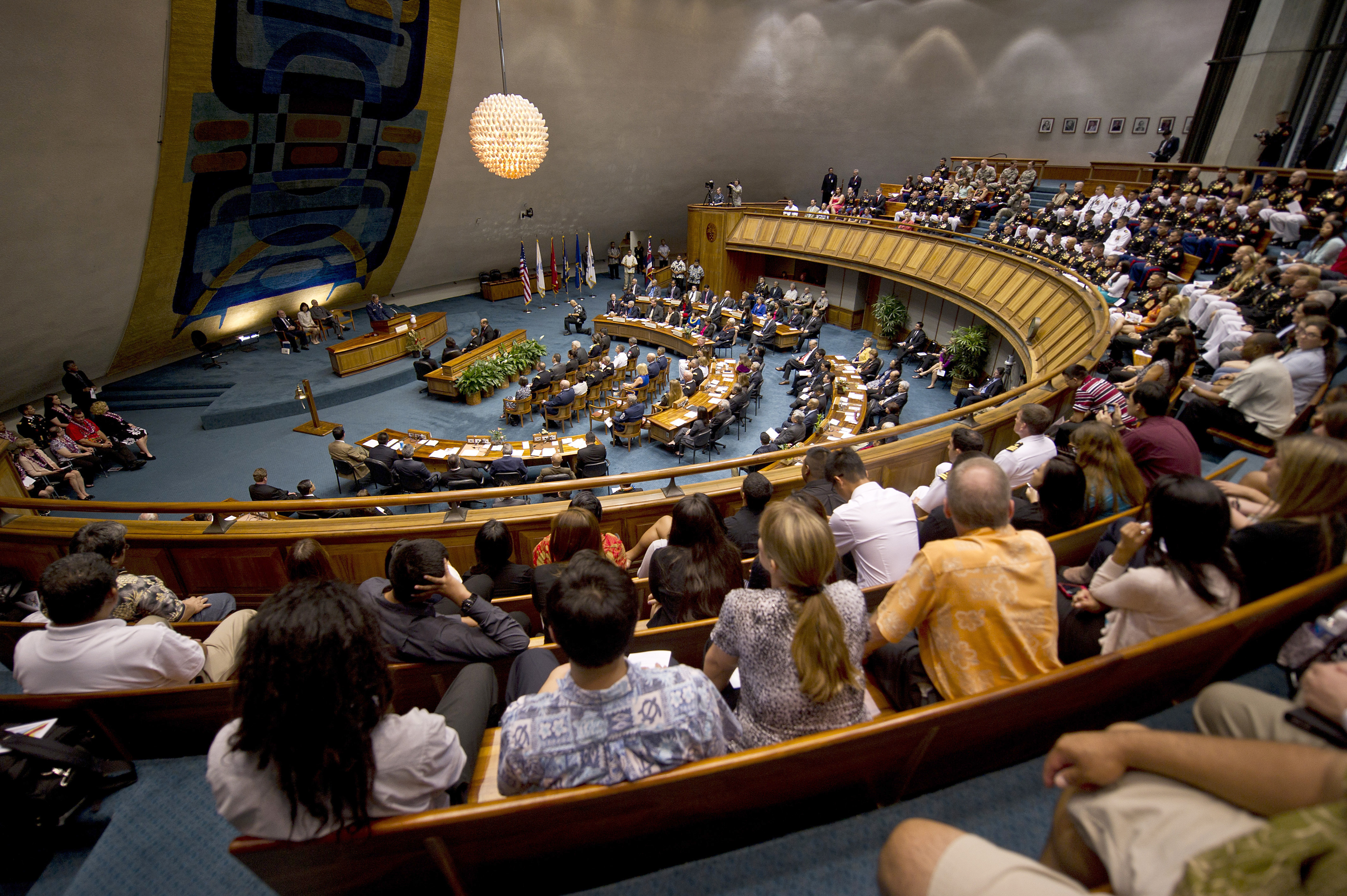
- State Senate Chamber; Hawaii State Capitol; Honolulu, Hawaii

Website
- capitol.hawaii.gov/senate

Rules
- Rules of the Senate

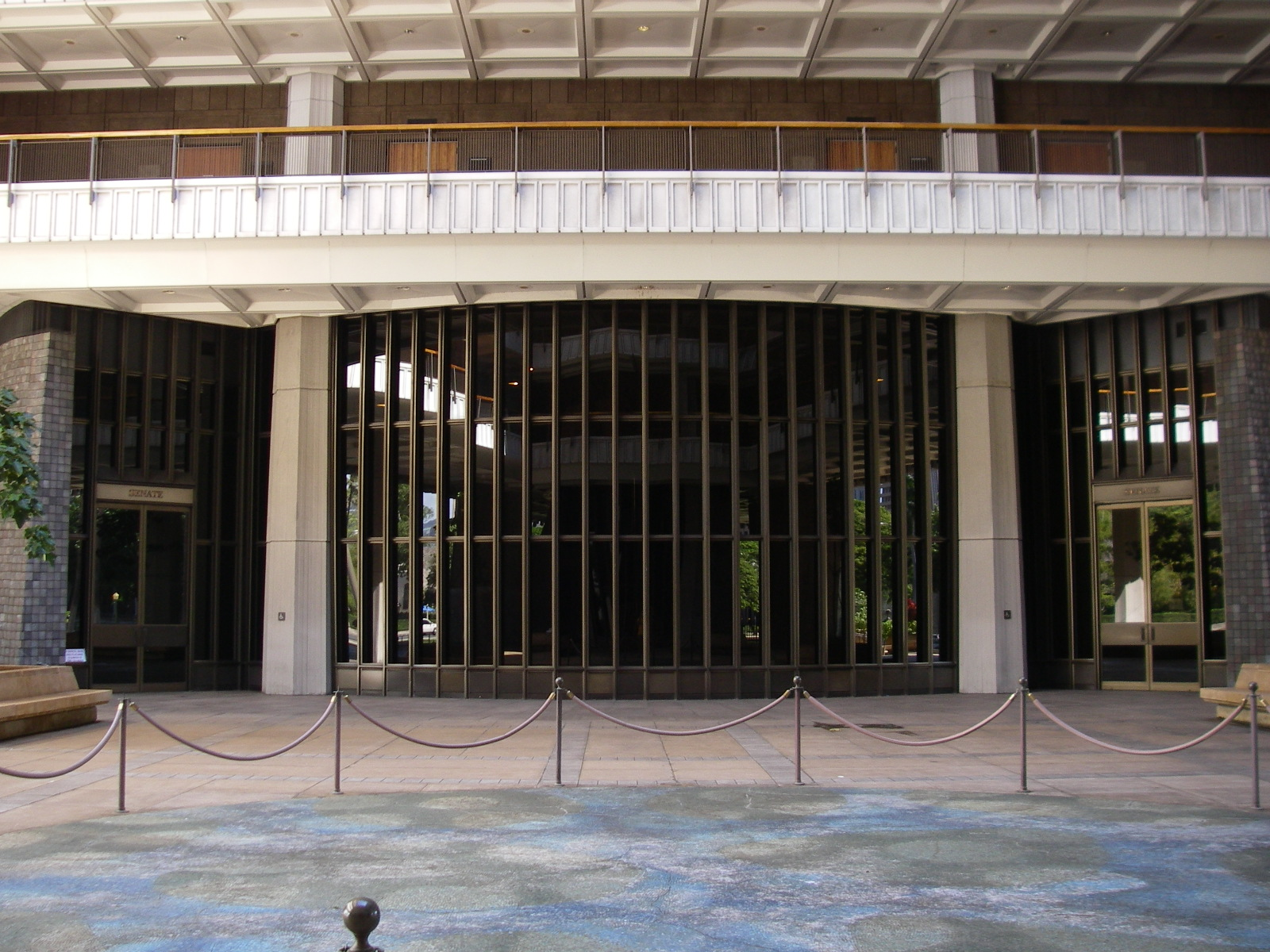
Entrance to the Hawaii State Senate chamber

The Hawaii State Senate (Hawaiian: Ka ʻAha Kenekoa) is the upper house of the Hawaii State Legislature. It consists of twenty-five members elected from an equal number of constituent districts across the islands and is led by the President of the Senate, elected from the membership of the body, currently Ron Kouchi. The forerunner of the Hawaii Senate during the government of the Kingdom of Hawaii was the House of Nobles originated in 1840. In 1894, the Constitution of the Republic of Hawaii renamed the upper house the present senate. Senators are elected to four-year terms and are not subject to term limits.

Like most state legislatures in the United States, the Hawaii State Senate is a part-time body and senators often have active careers outside government. The lower house of the legislature is the Hawaii House of Representatives. The membership of the Senate also elects additional officers to include the Senate Vice President, Senate Chief Clerk, Assistant Chief Clerk, Senate Sergeant at Arms, and Assistant Sergeant at Arms. The Hawaii Senate convenes in the Hawaii State Capitol in Honolulu.

According to Article III, section 4 of the Hawaii State Constitution, a legislator's term begins on the day of the general election and ends the day of the general election if a new member is elected.

== Composition ==
The Democrats have controlled the chamber since 1963, and have held a supermajority since 1984.

From 2016 (when Sen. Sam Slom, Hawaii's sole Republican state Senator, was defeated in his bid for reelection) to 2018, the Democratic Party held all 25 seats in the Hawaii Senate. This made the Hawaii Senate the only state legislative chamber with no opposition members (this excludes the officially nonpartisan Nebraska Legislature). It was the first time since 1980 (when both the Alabama Senate and Louisiana Senate were all-Democratic) that any state legislative chamber had been completely dominated by a single party.

Affiliation	Party (Shading indicates majority caucus)			Total	Vacant
Affiliation	Democratic	Republican	Independent	Total	Vacant
End of previous legislature (2026)	22	3	0	25	0
Begin (2027)	22	2	1	25	0
Latest voting share	88%	8%	4%		

=== Leadership ===
Position	Name	Party	District
President of the Senate	Ron Kouchi	Democratic	8
Majority Leader	Dru Kanuha	Democratic	3
Minority Leader	Samantha DeCorte	Republican	22

=== Officers ===
Position	Name
Chief Clerk	Carol T. Taniguchi
Assistant Chief Clerk	Ainoa A. Naniole
Sergeant-at-Arms	Bienvenido C. Villaflor
Assistant Sergeant-at-Arms	C.M. Park Kaleiwahea

=== List of current members ===
District	Name	Party	County(ies)	Areas represented	Start
1	Lorraine Inouye	Dem	Hawaiʻi	Hilo, Paukaʻa, Papaikou, Pepeʻekeo	2014 (Note: Previously served in Senate from 1998 to 2008)
2	Joy San Buenaventura	Dem	Hawaiʻi	Puna	2020 (Note: Previously served in House from 2014 to 2020)
3	Dru Kanuha	Dem	Hawaiʻi	Kona, Kaʻū, Volcano	2018
4	Tim Richards III	Dem	Hawaiʻi	North Hilo, Hāmākua, Kohala, Waimea, Waikōloa, North Kona	2022
5	Troy Hashimoto	Dem	Maui	Wailuku, Kahului, Waiheʻe, Waikapu Mauka, Waiʻehu	2023 (Note: Senator was originally appointed) (Note: Previously served in House from 2018 to 2023)
6	Angus McKelvey	Dem	Maui	West Maui, Māʻalaea, Waikapū, South Maui	2022 (Note: Previously served in House from 2006 to 2022)
7	Lynn DeCoite	Dem	Maui, Kalawao	Hāna, East and Upcountry Maui, Molokaʻi, Lānaʻi and Kahoʻolawe, Molokini	2021 (Note: Previously served in House from 2015 to 2021)
8	Ron Kouchi	Dem	Kauaʻi	Kauaʻi, Niʻihau	2010
9	Stanley Chang	Dem	Honolulu	Hawaiʻi Kai, Kuliʻouʻou, Niu, ʻĀina Haina, Waiʻalae-Kāhala, Diamond Head, Kaimukī, Kapahulu	2016
10	Jackson Sayama	Dem	Honolulu	Pālolo, St. Louis Heights, Maunalani Heights, Ala Wai mauka, portions of Kaimukī, Kapahulu, Mōʻiliʻili, McCully	2026 (Note: Previously served in House from 2020 to 2026)
11	Carol Fukunaga	Dem	Honolulu	Mānoa, Makiki/Punchbowl, Papakōlea, Tantalus, and University	2022 (Note: Previously served in House from 1979 to 1982, House from 1987 to 1992, and Senate from 1992 to 2012)
12	Sharon Moriwaki	Dem	Honolulu	Waikīkī, Ala Moana, Kaka‘ako, McCully	2018
13	Tricia Nakamatsu	Dem	Honolulu	Dowsett Highlands, Puʻunui, Nuʻuanu, Pacific Heights, Pauoa, Punchbowl, Pālama, Liliha, Iwilei, Chinatown, and Downtown	2026
14	Donna Mercado Kim	Dem	Honolulu	Kapālama, ʻĀlewa, Kalihi, Kalihi Valley, Ft. Shafter, Moanalua Gardens & Valley, Red Hill	2000 (Note: Previously served in House from 1982 to 1985)
15	Glenn Wakai	Dem	Honolulu	Kalihi, Māpunapuna, Airport, Salt Lake, Āliamanu, Foster Village, Hickam, Pearl Harbor, and portions of ʻAiea and Pearl City	2010 (Note: Previously served in House from 2002 to 2010)
16	Brandon Elefante	Dem	Honolulu	ʻAiea, ʻAiea Heights, Hālawa, Pearlridge, Newtown, Royal Summit, Waimalu, Waiau, Momilani, Pacific Palisades, and Pearl City	2022
17	Donovan Dela Cruz	Dem	Honolulu	Portion of Mililani, Mililani Mauka, portion of Waipiʻo Acres, Launani Valley, Wahiawā, Whitmore Village	2010
18	Danielle Bass (Note: Democrat Michelle Kidani resigned on June 30, 2026. State planning official Danielle Bass was appointed on August 9, 2026 to fill the seat.)	Dem	Honolulu	Mililani Town, Waipiʻo Gentry, Crestview, Waikele, portion of Waipahu, Village Park, Royal Kunia	2026
19	Rachele Lamosao (Note: Democrat Henry Aquino resigned on November 30, 2025. State representative Rachele Lamosao was appointed on December 3, 2025 to fill the seat.)	Dem	Honolulu	Pearl City, Waipahu, West Loch Estates, Honoʻuliʻuli, Hoʻopili	2025 (Note: Previously served in House from 2022 to 2026)
20	Bob McDermott	Rep	Honolulu	ʻEwa Beach, Ocean Pointe, ʻEwa by Gentry, Iroquois Point, portion of ʻEwa Villages	2026 (Note: Previously served in House from 1996 to 2002 and 2012 to 2022)
21	Mike Gabbard	Dem (Note: Gabbard initially served as a Republican from 2006–2007 and later as a Democrat from 2007–present.)	Honolulu	Kapolei, Makakilo, Kalaeloa, Honokai Hale, portions of Fernandez Village, ‘Ewa, and Ko ʻOlina	2006
22	Samantha DeCorte	Rep	Honolulu	Ko ʻOlina, Nānākuli, Māʻili, Waiʻanae, Mākaha, Mākua	2024
23	Brenton Awa	Ind (Note: Awa initially served as a Republican from 2022–2026 and later as an Independent from 2026–present.)	Honolulu	Kāneʻohe, Kahaluʻu thru Lāʻie, Kahuku to Mokulēʻia, Schofield Barracks, Kunia Camp	2022
24	Jarrett Keohokalole	Dem	Honolulu	Kāneʻohe, Kailua	2018 (Note: Previously served in House from 2014 to 2018)
25	Chris Lee	Dem	Honolulu	Kailua, Waimānalo, Hawaiʻi Kai	2020 (Note: Previously served in House from 2008 to 2020)

== Capitol ==
The Hawaiʻi State Senate has been meeting at the Hawaiʻi State Capitol in downtown Honolulu since March 15, 1969. Previous to the decision of Governor John A. Burns to build the new Capitol building, the Hawaiʻi State Senate met in ʻIolani Palace.

== See also ==
- List of Hawaii state legislatures
