= Hawaii House Bill 444 =

2010 bill to legalize civil unions

LGBTQ rights in Hawaii

Baehr v. Lewin (1993)
Baehr v. Miike (1996, 1999)
Constitutional Amendment 2 (1998)
House Bill 444 (2009)
Senate Bill 232 (2011)
Hawaii Marriage Equality Act (2013)
Amendment 1 (2024)

Equality Hawaii

LGBTQ rights in the United States
Same-sex marriage in Hawaii
Reciprocal beneficiary relationships in Hawaii
LGBTQ history in Hawaii

House Bill 444 (abbreviated H.B. 444) was a 2009 bill of the Hawaii State Legislature, passed in April 2010 and vetoed by Governor of Hawaii Linda Lingle, that would have legalized civil unions for couples in the state of Hawaii. Its legislative process was accompanied by controversy over the bill's content and effects and rallies were held by supporters and opponents.

The bill passed the Hawaii House of Representatives in February 2009 in a form specific to same-sex couples, was passed in amended form including opposite-sex couples by the Hawaii Senate in May 2009, and was carried over in the 2010 session, where it passed the Senate again in January 2010 with a veto-proof majority. The bill moved back to the House but was indefinitely postponed by a voice vote initiated by House Speaker Calvin Say, requiring a vote of two-thirds of Representatives to be taken up again in 2010, and was considered dead. In April 2010, on the last day of the legislative session, the House suspended the rules on the Senate bill and passed it with a majority, sending the bill to Governor Linda Lingle, who vetoed it in July 2010.

Hawaii did not allow same-sex marriages or civil unions, but two unmarried people can register for a reciprocal beneficiary relationship, which provides some of the rights and benefits that come with marriage. The bill was written to become law on January 1, 2010, would allow all couples to obtain rights equal to those of married couples, and make Hawaii the only state in the Western United States to allow civil unions instead of domestic partnerships.

== Content of the bill ==
House Bill 444 H.D. 1 as introduced and passed by the Hawaii House of Representatives "extends the same rights, benefits, protections, and responsibilities of spouses in a marriage to partners in a civil union." To be eligible for a civil union, the bill outlined that the person seeking a civil union may not already be in a civil union, marriage, or reciprocal beneficiary relationship with someone else, the two people seeking a civil union must be of the same sex, both members of the civil union must be 18 years or older, and the two partners must not be related. The bill also enumerated familial relationships in which civil unions would be automatically nullified, such as a man with his father, grandfather, or son, or a woman with her mother, grandmother, or daughter. If one of the persons had a guardian, the guardian had to consent for the subject to obtain a civil union.

Section 1, § —9 of House Bill 444 explained that "partners to a civil union ... shall have all the same rights, benefits, protections, and responsibilities under law ... as are granted to spouses in a marriage." The bill also recognized domestic partnerships, civil unions, and same-sex marriages performed in other states as civil unions in Hawaii, and would have taken effect on January 1, 2010. In addition, House Bill 444 repealed a statute that declared "private solemnization not unlawful."

House Bill S.D. 1 444 as passed by the Hawaii Senate was amended to remove the bill's reference to same-sex couples, include language stating the legislature's intent not change the definition of marriage, and include partners in civil unions for use of the terms "spouse", "family", "immediate family", "dependent", and "next of kin". The language of the bill's coming into effect remained unchanged at January 1, 2010.

== Legislative process ==
=== Past bills ===
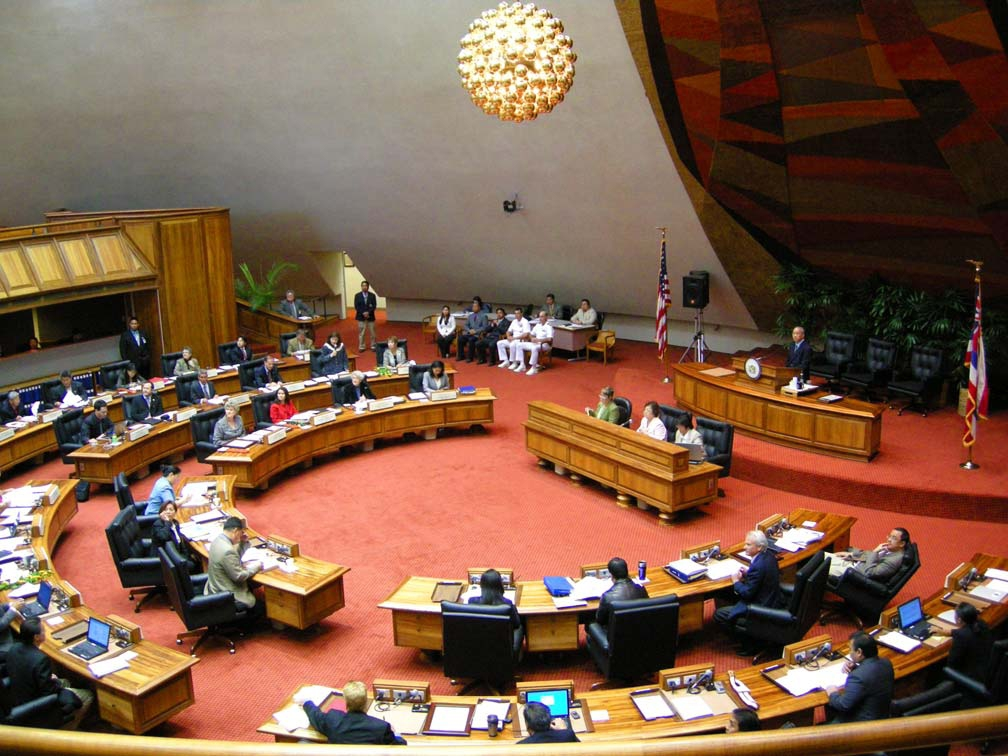
Hawaii House of Representatives chamber

Following Baehr v. Lewin, a 1993 decision by the Supreme Court of Hawaii that found the state's refusal to grant same-sex couples marriage licenses discriminatory, voters in 1998 approved a constitutional amendment granting the Hawaii State Legislature the power to reserve marriage to opposite-sex couples, and the legislature passed a law banning same-sex marriage. Civil unions were not restricted. Bills creating civil unions were considered several times, but failed to receive committee approval prior to 2009.

=== 2009 session ===
H.B. 444 was introduced in the Hawaii House of Representatives on January 26, 2009. It passed the Hawaii House Judiciary Committee on February 5, 2009, with 12 members voting in favor and none opposed and was approved by the Hawaii House of Representatives on February 12, 2009, with 33 members voting in favor and 17 opposed, one vote fewer than the two-thirds vote needed to override a veto by the Republican governor Linda Lingle, who did not indicate whether she considered a veto. It was referred to the Hawaii Senate on February 13, 2009. A hearing by the Committee on Judiciary and Government Operations (JGO) was held at the State Capitol on February 24, 2009, with the outcome of three senators supporting the bill and three opposed; the bill was not passed out of committee.

The Senate Democratic leadership stated the bill might be taken from committee and brought to a debate before the full Senate, which was possible after March 10, 2009. Following a rally held on February 22, 2009, that opposed the passage of H.B. 444 and in which between 2,000 and 8,000 people participated, a number of Democratic senators became unwilling to vote in favor of the motion, citing concerns about changing common Senate procedure. The number of senators supporting civil unions was reduced from 18 to 13 out of 25 senators. Supporters held a candlelight vigil attended by 300 to 400 people in support of the bill on March 7, 2009.

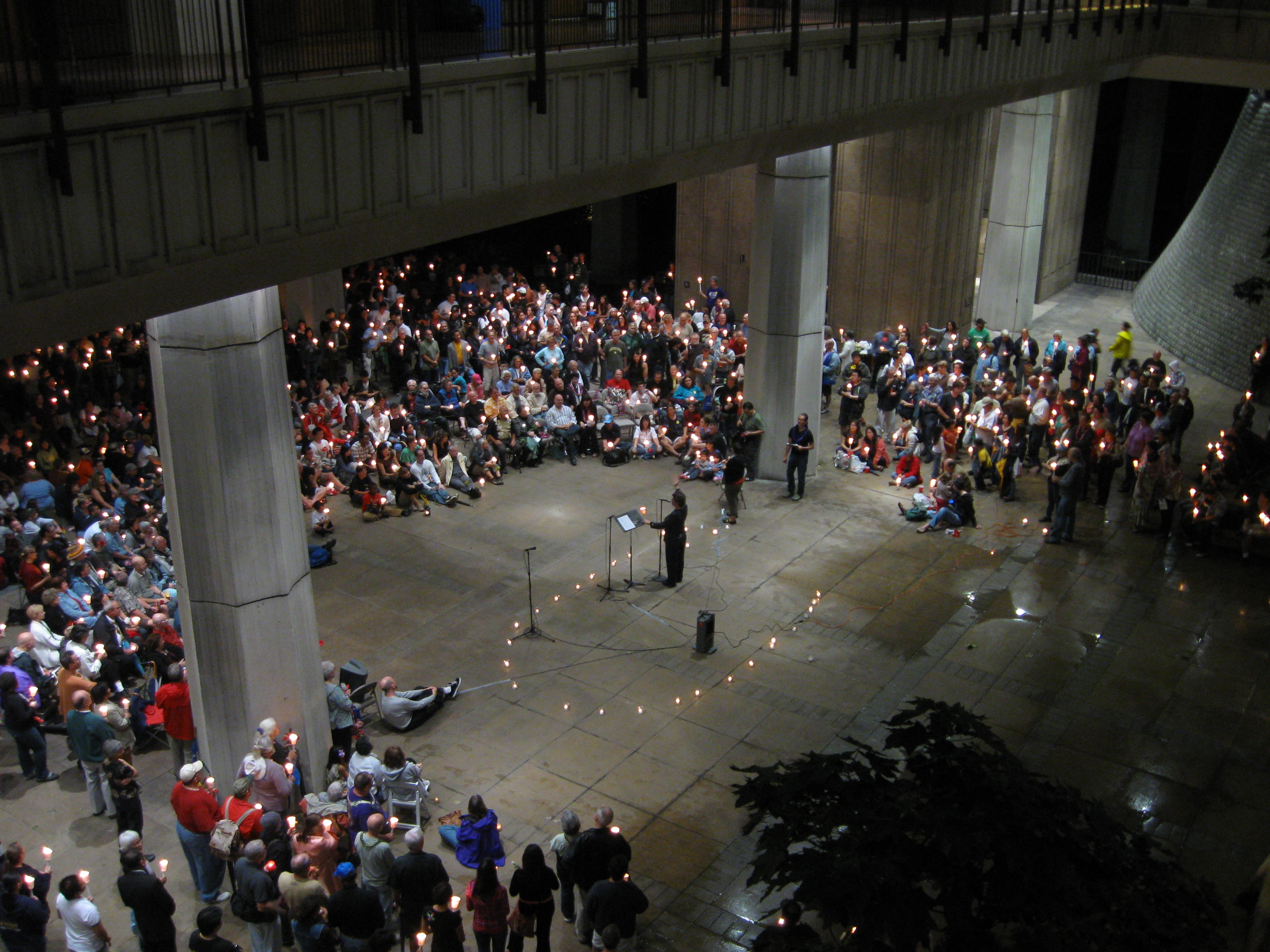
Vigil attended by supporters of H.B. 444 on March 7, 2009

Senator Will Espero offered an amendment to the bill that would have reduced the number of benefits granted, stating this would remove concerns that civil unions were similar to marriage. Passing an amended bill would have required the House to vote on it again or to establish a conference committee to negotiate differences between versions of both chambers. Supporters of civil unions stated they would not support the compromise, and a senator argued that "an amendment will kill it." Hawaii Senate Majority Leader Gary Hooser stated in March 2009 he would try to bring the bill to a vote if no other senator did so by the end of the legislative session in May 2009. It was not clear how many senators supported Hooser and opposing groups announced protests if action was taken. On March 25, 2009, the attempt to bring the bill before the full Senate failed when six senators supported the measure instead of the required nine senators. Senate President Colleen Hanabusa and JGO chairman Brian Taniguchi had opposed recalling H.B. 444 from Taniguchi's committee, citing unwillingness to change the traditional lawmaking process.

Supporters of HB 444 during final day of decision.

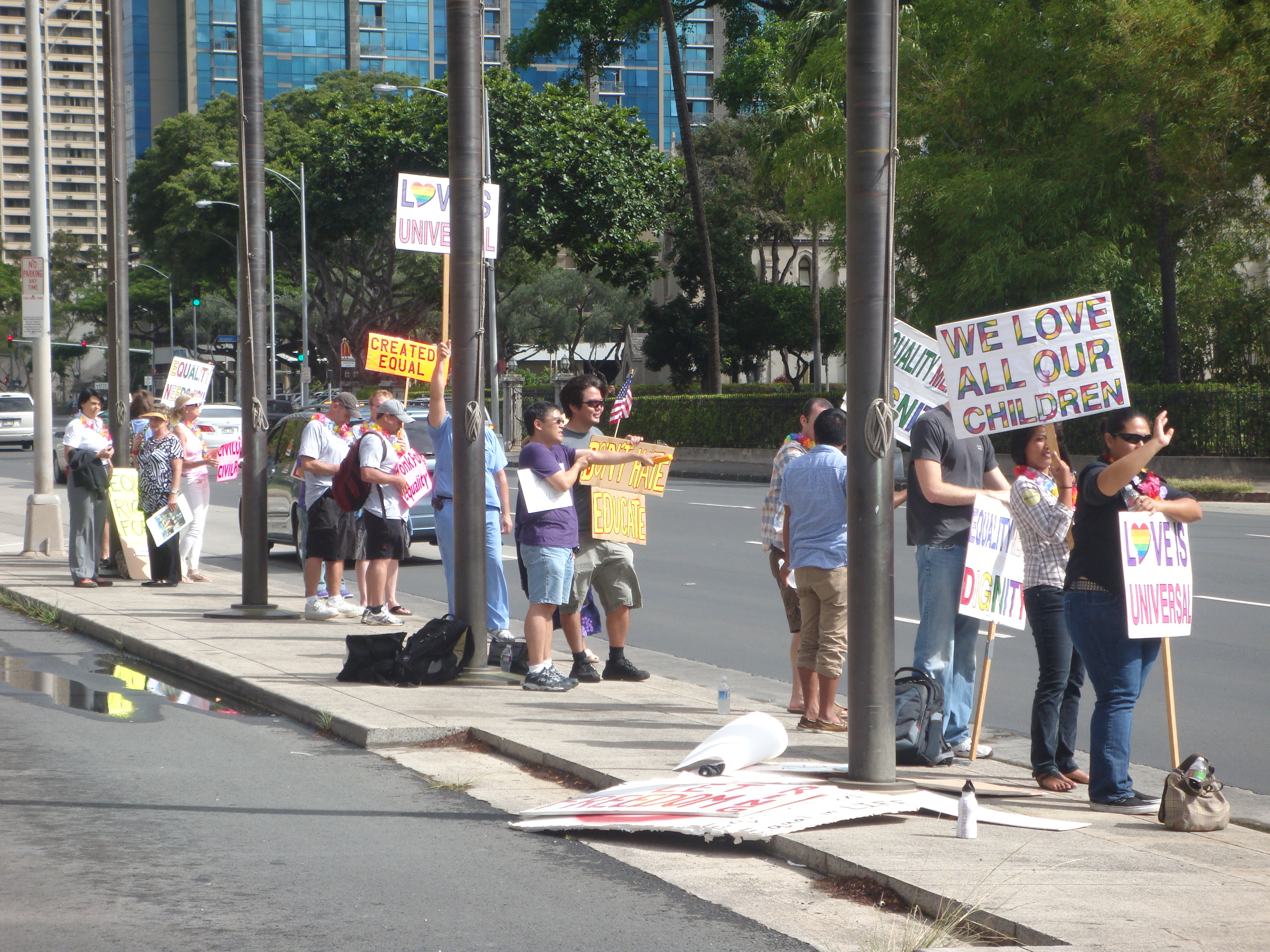
Supporters of HB 444 waved signs in front of the Capitol to garner support for civil unions before Linda Lingle announced her decision to veto the bill.

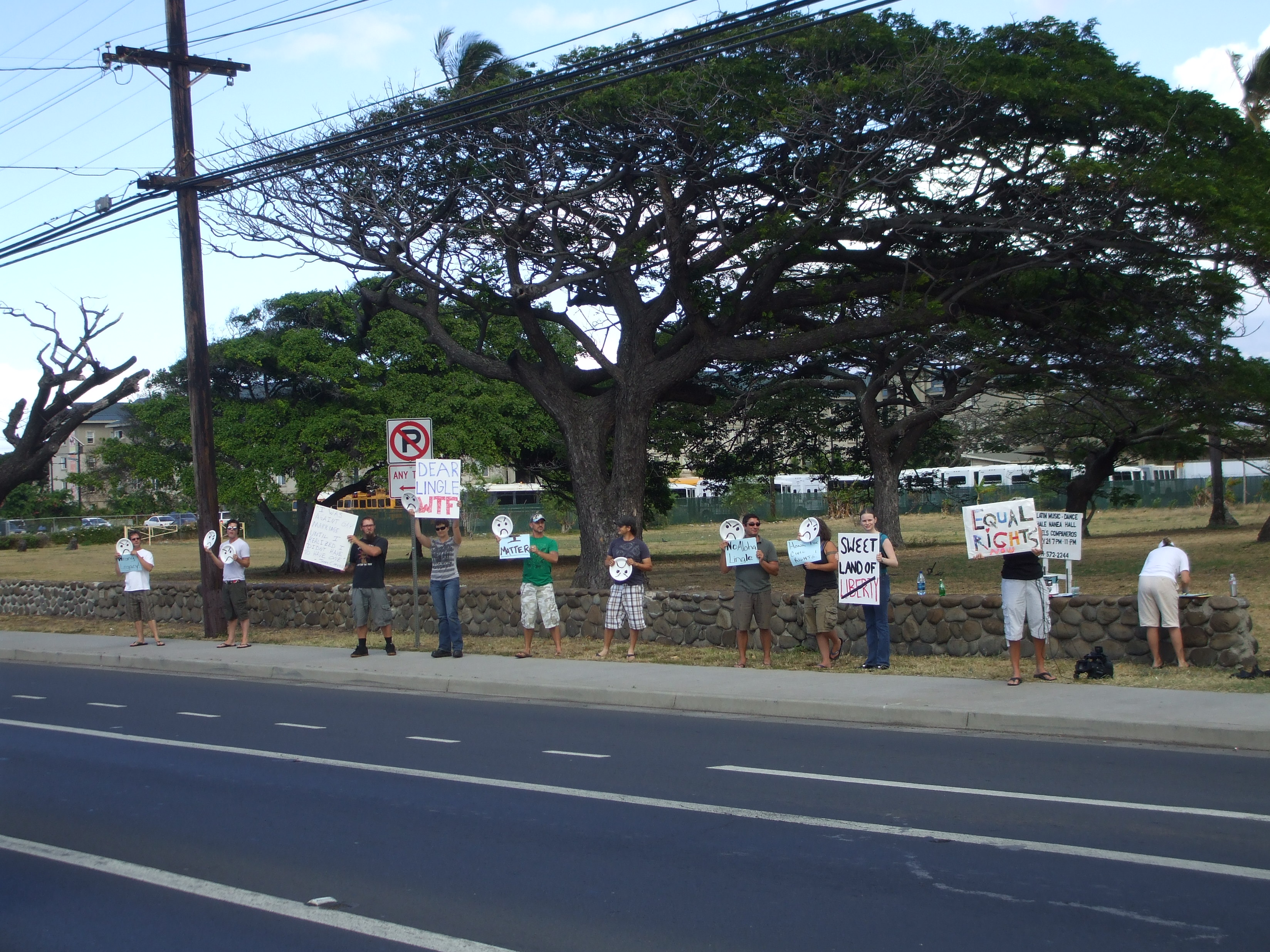
Supporters of HB 444 protesting Linda Lingle's veto of the bill along Kaahumanu Avenue on Maui.

On May 7, 2009, a second motion to recall the bill from committee, initiated by Senator Les Ihara, Jr., was successful after 10 Democrats voted in favor. The Senate Democratic Leadership, Democrats opposed to civil unions, and Senate Republicans voted in favor of an amendment to the bill that added language reaffirming the distinction between civil unions and marriage and allowing same-sex and opposite-sex couples to enter civil unions. The amendment was adopted, which killed the bill, as a revised version required renewed approval by the Hawaii House of Representatives and the legislature adjourned May 8, 2009. Senate President Hanabusa stated the issue would not be taken up again before 2010.

=== 2010 session ===
The bill was carried over into the 2010 session and Lingle stated in January 2010 that the bill was a distraction from the budget and should not be voted on for final passage in the Senate. Senator Brian Taniguchi argued the legislature could work on several issues simultaneously and the bill would pass. If passed, the amended bill would have to be approved by the House of Representatives. Speaker of the House Calvin Say stated that a vote on the bill would depend on whether the Senate passed the bill with enough votes to override a gubernatorial veto, arguing that he does not want to force a vote on controversial legislation in an election year if the bill's approval was in doubt. The Senate bill contains an effective date of January 1, 2010, and if the language is not changed, the bill could be vetoed regardless of its content.

The Senate passed an unchanged bill on January 22, 2010, with a veto-proof two-thirds' majority, after an amendment to update the effective date was rejected. The measure moved for final approval to the House of Representatives, but on January 29, House Speaker Calvin Say moved to indefinitely postpone a vote on the bill, which was approved by voice vote. No votes were recorded and the move deferred action on the bill for 2010 unless two-thirds of Representatives vote to reconsider the bill, and it was considered dead.

On April 29, the last day of the legislative session, the Senate bill was revived in the Hawaii House following a motion by Majority Leader Blake Oshiro. Speaker Calvin Say immediately ordered a recess and after the representatives returned four votes to suspend legislative rules postponing the issue were taken and the bill passed with 31 to 20 votes. Governor Linda Lingle had until July 6 to decide whether to sign or veto the measure. The House vote margin in support is not large enough to override a gubernatorial veto. Lingle vetoed the bill on July 6, arguing civil unions should be decided by referendum. The House had ruled out any attempt to override her vetoes for the legislative session.

== Reactions ==
Gubernatorial candidates positions on HB 444

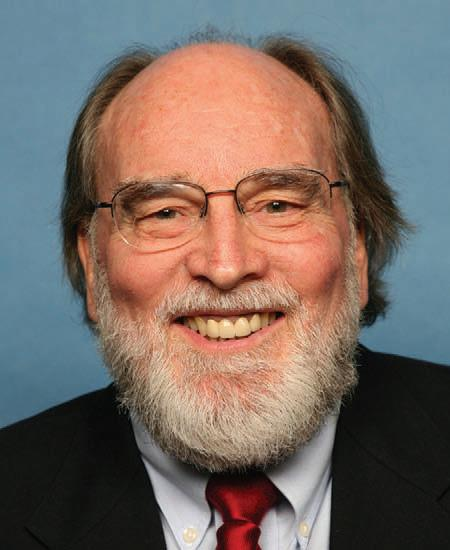
Neil Abercrombie, U.S. Representative from Hawaii and a supporter of H.B. 444.

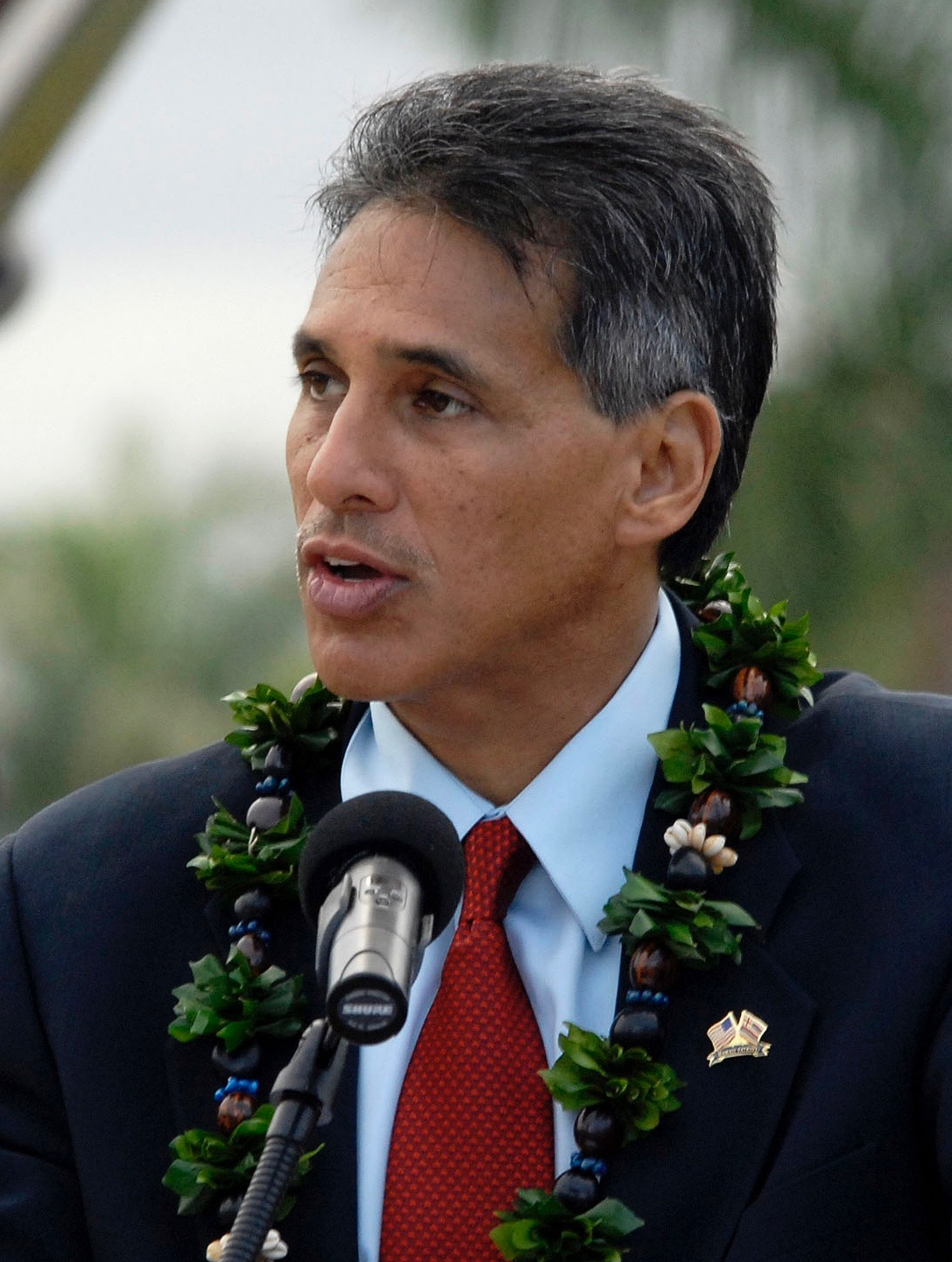
Duke Aiona, Lieutenant Governor of Hawaii and an opponent of H.B. 444.

Following the introduction of H.B. 444, gay rights organizations stated their support, arguing the bill supported equality in an ethnically diverse state. Religious groups began to set up websites, take out newspaper advertisements and hold rallies in opposition to the bill, arguing it ran against marriage. The Roman Catholic Bishop of Honolulu, Clarence Richard Silva, called the bill "a travesty to the democratic process" that "ignores the will of the people." Marc Alexander, vicar general of the Roman Catholic Diocese of Honolulu, argued that civil unions are "same-sex marriage under a different name".

The non-profit organization Hawaii Family Forum, which opposed the bill, organized the February 22 rally with local churches and achieved a large turnout. Interfaith Alliance Hawaii, made up of people of Christian, Jewish and Buddhist faiths, stated their support for the bill and argued it did not "endanger [civil unions opponents'] concept of marriage or family values." Linda Krieger, a University of Hawaii law professor and adviser for a student gay rights group, stated "where the fundamental civil rights of an unpopular minority are at stake, the principle of 'letting the people decide' is often a mere cloak for majoritarian tyranny." The First Unitarian Church of Honolulu sponsored a poll that found 70 percent opposition to same-sex marriage and 67 percent support on whether gays and lesbians should have the "same rights as everyone else."

The Senate hearings on the bill attracted large turnout and testimony was recorded for 15 hours. In the hearing, bill opponents outnumbered supporters. Mike Gabbard, who sponsored the 1998 amendment permitting the legislature to outlaw same-sex marriage, argued the bill would lead to same-sex marriage being taught in Hawaiian schools. Kim Coco Iwamoto of the Hawaii Board of Education countered civil unions would make children in gay families less likely to be harassed. Lieutenant Governor of Hawaii Duke Aiona criticized the bill, arguing it "attempts to circumvent the will of the people by authorizing the equivalent to same-sex marriage". U.S. Representative Neil Abercrombie supported the bill, stating "it is shameful that while they must give their equal share to the government, the government will not give them equal protection" about gay and lesbian citizens of Hawaii.

The Honolulu Advertiser reported that the Senate Democratic leadership reconsidered their support for the bill because of the large demonstration of opponents and their pressure on senators to oppose the bill. It found that some senators privately suggested the bill's delay in committee or a proposed amendment to the bill were ways to avoid taking a vote following the controversy.

The candlelight vigil following the bill's defeat in committee was attended by labor union members and religious groups. Father Richard Shields of the Episcopal Diocese of Hawaii stated religion should be taken out of the argument and a spokesperson for the hotel and restaurant union Local 5 argued the bill provided economic justice. A letter later sent to senators in support of the H.B. 444 by community groups, including the Local 5 union, the Hawaii NAACP, the Hawaii State Democratic Women's Caucus, and the Japanese American Citizens League.

In response to Majority Leader Gary Hooser's statement that he intended to bring the bill to a vote before the full Senate, the Hawaii Family Forum stated other issues demanded more attention than civil unions and the bill would create legal challenges for child care and education. The group held demonstrations on Maui and Kauai and stated their intention to hold demonstrations to ask the governor to veto the legislation should the bill advance. Hooser argued for the bill using President Barack Obama's support of civil unions and the support of labor unions and the majority of Hawaii House representatives. The Honolulu Advertiser reported that Senate President Colleen Hanabusa privately told senators the bill could lead to a lawsuit to legalize same-sex marriage. The American Civil Liberties Union of Hawaii and Supreme Court of Hawaii judge Steven H. Levinson told the legislature that a lawsuit would have little chance of success.

Following the adoption of the amended version of H.B. 444, Senator Les Ihara, Jr. stated, "I have a hard time reconciling the statement that the proponents made, that this is for equal rights and civil unions—at the same time, this kills it for the session." Michael Golojuch of Parents, Families and Friends of Lesbians and Gays called the vote "a dog-and-pony show". Hawaii Family Forum leader and former Democratic state representative Dennis Arakaki commented that "things worked out for the good."

Hooser began a campaign in June 2009 to be elected Lieutenant Governor of Hawaii in 2010, calling his support for the bill an act on a "critical issue". Neil Abercrombie was elected to succeed Linda Lingle as governor in the 2010 gubernatorial election, defeating Duke Aiona.

On July 6, 2010, following Lingle's veto of the bill, Lambda Legal and the ACLU announced that they would file a lawsuit to enable civil unions, stating that "our constitution prevents discrimination based on sexual orientation." (Note: Article I, Section 5 of the Hawaii State Constitution: "No person shall ... be denied the enjoyment of the person's civil rights or be discriminated against in the exercise thereof because of race, religion, sex or ancestry.")
