= Same-sex marriage in Hawaii =

Same-sex marriage has been legal in Hawaii since December 2, 2013. The Hawaii State Legislature held a special session beginning on October 28, 2013, and passed the Hawaii Marriage Equality Act legalizing same-sex marriage. Governor Neil Abercrombie signed the legislation on November 13, and same-sex couples began marrying on December 2, making Hawaii the fifteenth U.S. state to legalize same-sex marriage. Hawaii also allows both same-sex and opposite-sex couples to formalize their relationships legally in the form of civil unions and reciprocal beneficiary relationships. Civil unions provide the same rights, benefits, and obligations of marriage at the state level, while reciprocal beneficiary relationships provide a more limited set of rights. When Hawaii's civil union law took effect at the start of 2012, same-sex marriages established in other jurisdictions were considered civil unions in Hawaii.

Hawaii's denial of marriage licenses to same-sex couples was first challenged in state court in 1991, and the plaintiffs initially met with some success. In 1993, a ruling by the Supreme Court of Hawaii made Hawaii the first state in the United States to consider legal challenges to bans on same-sex marriage. However, Hawaii voters later amended the State Constitution in 1998 to allow the State Legislature to restrict marriage to opposite-sex couples. By the time the Supreme Court of Hawaii considered the final appeal in the case in 1999, it upheld the state's ban on same-sex marriage. This amendment was ultimately repealed by voters through a ballot measure in 2024, explicitly removing the Legislature's authority to reserve marriage to opposite-sex couples.

== Civil unions ==
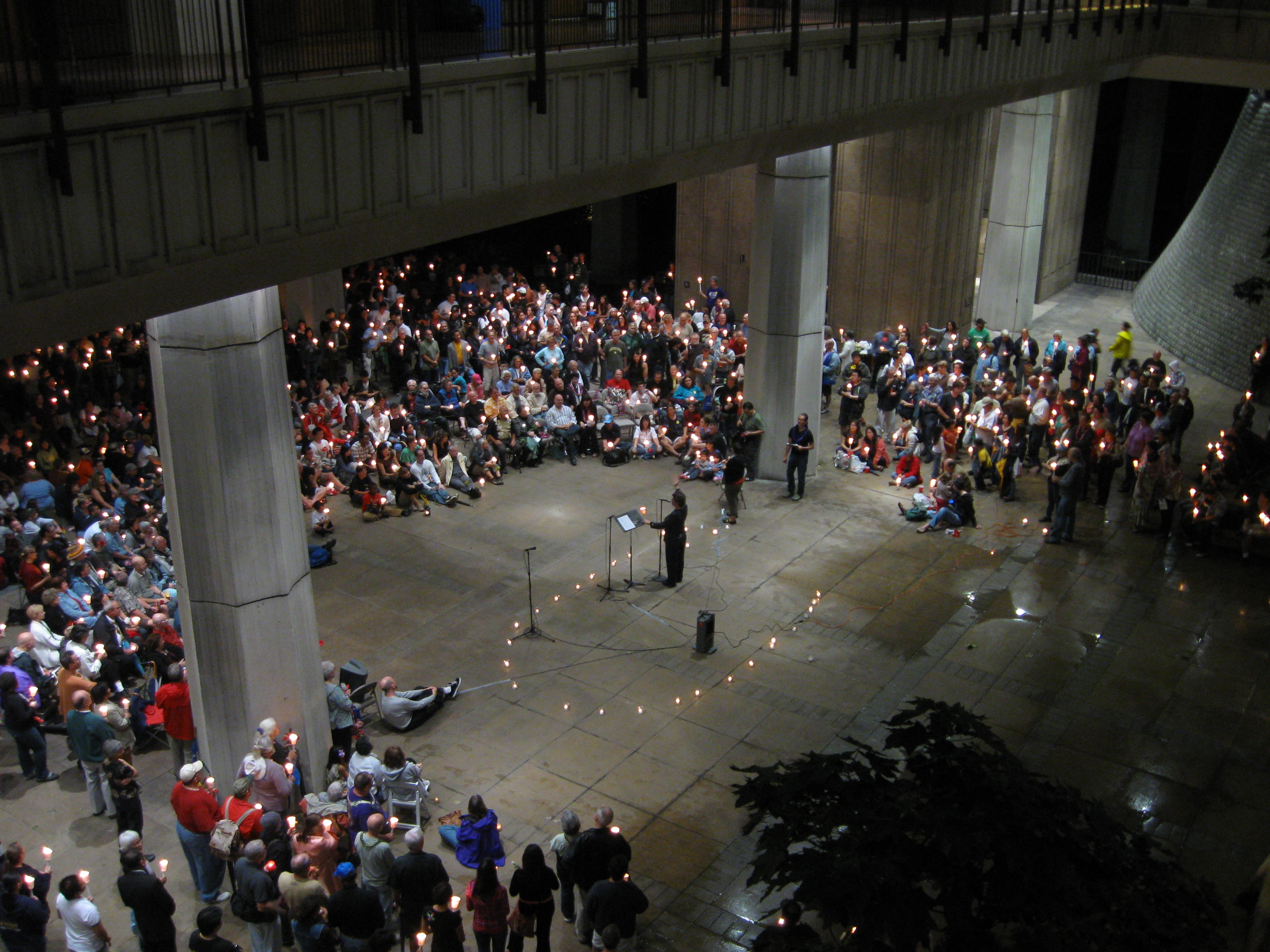
Rally in support of civil unions at the Hawaii State Capitol, 2009

LGBTQ rights in Hawaii

Baehr v. Lewin (1993)
Baehr v. Miike (1996, 1999)
Constitutional Amendment 2 (1998)
House Bill 444 (2009)
Senate Bill 232 (2011)
Hawaii Marriage Equality Act (2013)
Amendment 1 (2024)

Equality Hawaii

LGBTQ rights in the United States
Same-sex marriage in Hawaii
Reciprocal beneficiary relationships in Hawaii
LGBTQ history in Hawaii

Civil unions (Hawaiian: uniona kīwila, pronounced [uniˈjonə tiːˈvilə]) were introduced in Hawaii on January 1, 2012, following the passage of legislation in early 2011. These unions provide all of the rights, benefits and responsibilities of marriage at the state level. In 1997, the state established reciprocal beneficiary relationships, open to all couples as well as blood relatives, offering numerous spousal rights including the ability to sue for wrongful death, decisions about health care, proptery rights and co-tenancy, inheritance without a will, and insurance and state pensions.

Bills creating civil unions were considered several times, but failed to receive approval in legislative committees before 2009. In 2010, Hawaii House Bill 444, which would have created civil unions for same-sex and opposite-sex couples, passed the House of Representatives and Senate. Governor Linda Lingle vetoed it in July 2010. Following Lingle's veto, the American Civil Liberties Union and Lambda Legal filed Young v. Lingle on behalf of six same-sex couples. The suit, while acknowledging that the state had the constitutional authority to limit marriage to opposite-sex couples, asserted that the State Constitution still mandated that same-sex couples be accorded equal treatment. The suit was withdrawn on March 31, 2011.

A bill substantively similar to HB 444, Senate Bill 232, was passed on January 26, 2011 by the Senate Judiciary and Labor Committee in a 3–2 vote, and was passed by the Hawaii Senate 19–6 on January 28. A modification to the bill was then made in the House of Representatives before passage on February 11 by a vote of 31–19. The Senate passed the revised bill on February 16, and Governor Neil Abercrombie signed it into law on February 23. Civil unions began on January 1, 2012. 417 couples obtained a civil union license in the first six months after the law went into effect. Low participation may have been the result of technical issues that surrounded the conversion of a reciprocal beneficiary relationship to a civil union. A bill correcting the transitional issues was signed into law on July 6, 2012. At the end of 2012, over 700 couples had established civil unions. Since Hawaii enacted same-sex marriage in November 2013, civil unions remain an option for both opposite-sex and same-sex couples to access, making Hawaii one of only four states (Colorado, Illinois and New Jersey being the other three; several other states also recognize domestic partnerships providing many of the benefits of marriage) to allow for this practice.

== Same-sex marriage ==
=== Baehr case ===
Baehr v. Miike (originally Baehr v. Lewin) was a case decided by the Supreme Court of Hawaii, which initially found that the state's refusal to grant same-sex couples marriage licenses was discriminatory. In 1991, three same-sex couples sued Hawaii Director of Health John C. Lewin in his official capacity, seeking to force the state to issue them marriage licenses. The couples were Genora Dancel and Ninia Baehr, Joseph Melillo and Pat Lagon, and Tammy Rodrigues and Antoinette Pregil. After the case was dismissed by the trial court, the couples appealed to the Supreme Court. In the plurality opinion delivered by Associate Justice Steven Levinson and concurred in by Chief Justice Ronald Moon on May 5, 1993, the court ruled that while the right to privacy in the Hawaii Constitution does not include a fundamental right to same-sex marriage, denying marriage to same-sex couples constituted discrimination based on sex in violation of the right to equal protection guaranteed by the State Constitution. The court remanded the case to the trial court, instructing that "in accordance with the 'strict scrutiny' standard, the burden will rest on Lewin to overcome the presumption that HRS § 572-1 [the state's marriage statute] is unconstitutional by demonstrating that it furthers compelling state interests and is narrowly drawn to avoid unnecessary abridgments of constitutional rights."

In 1996, Judge Kevin S.C. Chang ruled that the state did not meet its evidentiary burden. It did not prove that the state had a compelling interest in denying marriage licenses to same-sex couples and even assuming that it had it had not proven that HRS § 572-1 was narrowly tailored to avoid unnecessary abridgement of constitutional rights. He enjoined the state from refusing to issue marriage licenses to otherwise-qualified same-sex couples. The following day, Chang stayed his ruling, acknowledging the "legally untenable" position couples would be in should the Hawaii Supreme Court reverse him on appeal.

On December 9, 1999, the Hawaii Supreme Court, following the passage of a constitutional amendment empowering the Hawaii State Legislature to limit marriage to opposite-sex couples, ruled that "The passage of the marriage amendment placed HRS § 572-1 on new footing. The marriage amendment validated HRS § 572-1 by taking the statute out of the ambit of the equal protection clause of the Hawaii Constitution, at least insofar as the statute, both on its face and as applied, purported to limit access to the marital status to opposite-sex couples. Accordingly, whether or not in the past it was violative of the equal protection clause in the foregoing respect, HRS § 572-1 no longer is. In light of the marriage amendment, HRS § 572-1 must be given full force and effect." Because the remedy sought by the plaintiffs – access to marriage licenses – was no longer available, this reversed Chang's ruling and remanded the case for entry of judgment in favor of the defendant. As no federal constitutional issues were raised, the case could not be brought to the U.S. Supreme Court.

=== Constitutional amendments ===
Results of Amendment 1 (2024) by county: Yes 50–60% / No 50–60%

Following the 1993 decision by the Hawaii Supreme Court that found the state's refusal to grant same-sex couples marriage licenses discriminatory, voters in 1998 approved a constitutional amendment, Amendment 2, granting the Hawaii State Legislature the power to reserve marriage to opposite-sex couples, which made it impossible to challenge the state's ban on same-sex marriage. The state had enacted a statute defining marriage as an institution for "one man and one woman" in 1994, following the first state court decision that questioned the state's denial of marriage licenses to same-sex couples. In 1996, the United States Congress also enacted the federal Defense of Marriage Act (DOMA; Hawaiian: Kānāwai Kūpale Male o ka makahiki 1996), which banned federal recognition of same-sex marriages.

In 2023, a coalition of local organizations was formed to repeal Amendment 2. Senator Chris Lee and Representative Adrian Tam announced their support for the campaign and pledged to push for the passage of legislation repealing the amendment. A constitutional amendment was introduced to the State Legislature on January 24, 2024 by Representative Scott Saiki. It passed the House on March 5 by 43 votes to 6, and the Senate on April 9 by 24 votes to 1. Senator Mike Gabbard, well-known for his opposition to same-sex marriage in the 1990s, gave a public apology in the Senate Judiciary Committee and voted to repeal the amendment in the final vote on the Senate floor. As Amendment 1, it was approved on November 5, 2024 with 56% of the vote. (Note: Voters were asked: "Shall the state constitution be amended to repeal the legislature's authority to reserve marriage to opposite-sex couples?") Constitutional amendments require a majority of all votes cast; taking the blank votes and overvotes into account, the measure passed by 51–40 percent. It was approved in all counties except Kalawao, and on all islands except Niʻihau and Molokaʻi.

March 5, 2024 vote in the House of Representatives
Political affiliation	Voted for	Voted against	Absent (Did not vote)
Democratic Party	42: Micah Aiu; Terez Amato; Della Au Belatti; Cory Chun; Luke Evslin; Sonny Ganaden; Cedric Gates; Mark Hashem; Daniel Holt; Natalia Hussey-Burdick; Greggor Ilagan; Linda Ichiyama; Kirstin Kahaloa; Jeanné Kapela; Darius Kila; Lisa Kitagawa; Bertrand Kobayashi; Trish La Chica; Rachele Lamosao; Nicole Lowen; Lisa Marten; Rose Martinez; Scot Matayoshi; Tyson Miyake; May Mizuno; Dee Morikawa; Nadine Nakamura; Mark Nakashima; Scott Nishimoto; Richard Onishi; Amy Perruso; Mahina Poepoe; Sean Quinlan; Scott Saiki; Jackson Sayama; Gregg Takayama; Jenna Takenouchi; Andrew Takuya Garrett; Adrian Tam; David Tarnas; Chris Toshiro Todd; Kyle Yamashita	1: Sam Satoru Kong	2: Elle Cochran; Justin Woodson
Republican Party	1: Kanani Souza	5: David Alcos; Diamond Garcia; Lauren Matsumoto; Elijah Pierick; Gene Ward	–
Total	43	6	2
Total	84.3%	11.8%	3.9%

April 9, 2024 vote in the Senate
Political affiliation	Voted for	Voted against	Absent (Did not vote)
Democratic Party	23: Henry Aquino; Stanley Chang; Lynn DeCoite; Donovan Dela Cruz; Brandon Elefante; Carol Fukunaga; Mike Gabbard; Troy Hashimoto; Les Ihara Jr.; Lorraine Inouye; Dru Kanuha; Jarrett Keohokalole; Michelle Kidani; Ron Kouchi; Chris Lee; Angus McKelvey; Donna Mercado Kim; Sharon Moriwaki; Karl Rhoads; Tim Richards III; Joy San Buenaventura; Maile Shimabukuro; Glenn Wakai	–	–
Republican Party	1: Brenton Awa	1: Kurt Fevella	–
Total	24	1	0
Total	96.0%	4.0%	0.0%

=== Jackson case ===
Jackson v. Abercrombie
- Court: United States District Court for the District of Hawaii
- Decided: August 8, 2012
- Citation: 884 F. Supp. 2d 1065

Case history
- Subsequent actions: Appealed sub. nom. Jackson v. Fuddy, No. 12-16995, 12-16998 (9th Cir.)

Holding
- Defendants' motion for summary judgment granted, plaintiff same-sex couples' motion for summary judgement denied; Hawaii's same-sex marriage ban upheld.

Court membership
- Judge sitting: Alan C. Kay U.S.D.J.

On December 7, 2011, a same-sex couple filed suit in the U.S. District Court for the District of Hawaii to obtain a marriage license in Hawaii. The state's denial was based on its marriage laws: Article 1 of the Hawaii Constitution, which left any decision on same-sex marriage to the Hawaii State Legislature, along with the statute that defined marriage only "between a man and a woman". The initial suit was styled Jackson v. Abercrombie, after first-named plaintiff Natasha Jackson and first-named defendant Governor Neil Abercrombie. On January 27, 2012, an amended complaint added plaintiff Gary Bradley, a partner in a same-sex civil union, who wanted to marry but thought it futile to apply. The plaintiffs argued that the marriage laws violated the Due Process and Equal Protection clauses of the U.S. Constitution. Governor Abercrombie agreed with the plaintiffs that the ban violated both clauses of the U.S. Constitution, but the state's Director of Health, Loretta Fuddy, was allowed to defend the ban.

In an order issued on August 8, 2012, U.S. District Court Judge Alan Kay rejected the plaintiffs' claims and granted the defendants' motion for summary judgment, upholding Hawaii's ban on same-sex marriage. Judge Kay's ruling became the first court decision to cite the "New Family Structure" research of Mark Regnerus, research discredited by the American Sociological Association as well as thoroughly rejected by the U.S. District Court for the Northern District of California during the Hollingsworth v. Perry trial.

The plaintiffs in Jackson appealed Judge Kay's ruling to the Ninth Circuit Court of Appeals, now restyled as Jackson v. Fuddy. The appeal was initially scheduled to be heard on a parallel track with a similar Nevada case before the same court, Sevcik v. Sandoval, until both cases were placed on hold, pending Supreme Court decisions in two other same-sex marriage cases, Hollingsworth v. Perry and United States v. Windsor. Those cases were resolved on June 26, 2013, and on November 13, Hawaii enacted the Hawaii Marriage Equality Act, ending its ban on same-sex marriage. Despite that legislation, the plaintiffs did not withdraw their suit as moot, but pressed their appeal seeking to have the lower court's order overturned. The Ninth Circuit heard oral arguments on September 8, 2014, along with Sevcik and another related case, Latta v. Otter, before Judges Stephen Reinhardt, Ronald M. Gould, and Marsha Berzon. The Ninth Circuit announced on October 10, 2014 that it had dismissed the case as moot because of Hawaii's legalization of same-sex marriage and voided the district court's decision.

=== Passage of legislation in 2013 ===
Same-sex marriage in the United States

In January 2013, a bill to legalize same-sex marriage in Hawaii was brought to the State Legislature, but the bill died without legislative action. By September, after the U.S. Supreme Court decisions in United States v. Windsor and Hollingsworth v. Perry, as well as months of negotiations within the Senate and House Democratic caucuses and with leaders of both chambers of the State Legislature, Governor Neil Abercrombie called forth a special session for October 28, with the promise of signing the bill, and the chamber leaderships were confident in having the necessary majority for passage.

The Senate passed the Marriage Equality Act of 2013 (Hawaiian: Kānāwai Kaulike Male o ka makahiki 2013) on October 30 by a vote of 20–4, and the House followed by a 30–19 vote on November 8, though not before an extensive 'citizens filibuster' attempt to block the bill's progress. The bill returned to the Senate for approval of House amendments which expanded religious exemptions, and the Senate provided final legislative approval on November 12, voting 19–4 for passage. Governor Abercrombie signed the bill on November 13, and same-sex couples began marrying on December 2, 2013. The first same-sex couple to marry in Hawaii was Jonipher Kwong and Chris Nelson seconds after midnight on December 2 at the First Unitarian Church in Honolulu. In the first two weeks after the law went into effect, 526 same-sex couples had applied for marriage licenses.

November 8, 2013 vote in the House of Representatives
Political affiliation	Voted for	Voted against	Absent (Did not vote)
Democratic Party	29: Della Au Belatti; Tom Brower; Denny Coffman; Cindy Evans; Faye Hanohano; Mark Hashem; Linda Ichiyama; Kaniela Ing; Derek Kawakami; Bertrand Kobayashi; Chris Lee; Nicole Lowen; Sylvia Luke; Angus McKelvey; John Mizuno; Dee Morikawa; Mark Nakashima; Scott Nishimoto; Takashi Ohno; Richard Onishi; Karl Rhoads; Scott Saiki; Calvin Say; Joseph M. Souki; Mark Takai; Gregg Takayama; Roy Takumi; Jessica Wooley; Kyle Yamashita	13: Henry Aquino; Karen Awana; Romy Cachola; Mele Carroll; Ty Cullen; Sharon Har; Ken Ito; Jo Jordan; Marcus Oshiro; James Tokioka; Clift Tsuji; Justin Woodson; Ryan Yamane	2: Rida Cabanilla; Isaac Choy
Republican Party	1: Cynthia Thielen	6: Richard Fale; Beth Fukumoto; Aaron Ling Johanson; Lauren Matsumoto; Bob McDermott; Gene Ward	–
Total	30	19	2
Total	58.8%	37.3%	3.9%

November 12, 2013 vote in the Senate
Political affiliation	Voted for	Voted against	Absent (Did not vote)
Democratic Party	19: Rosalyn Baker; Suzanne Chun Oakland; J. Kalani English; Will Espero; Brickwood Galuteria; Josh Green; Clayton Hee; David Ige; Les Ihara Jr.; Gil Kahele; Gilbert Keith-Agaran; Michelle Kidani; Clarence Nishihara; Russell Ruderman; Maile Shimabukuro; Malama Solomon; Laura Thielen; Jill Tokuda; Glenn Wakai	3: Mike Gabbard; Donna Mercado Kim; Ron Kouchi	2: Donovan Dela Cruz; Brian Taniguchi
Republican Party	–	1: Sam Slom	–
Total	19	4	2
Total	76.0%	16.0%	4.0%

The law states that "in order to make valid the marriage contract, which shall be permitted between two individuals without regard to gender, it shall be necessary" that the couple are of marriageable age, are not married or in a civil union with a third party, and are not related by blood. It also makes provisions to recognize same-sex marriages performed in other states and countries:

Marriages between two individuals regardless of gender and legal where contracted shall be held legal in the courts of this State. [HRS § 572-3]

Hawaii Circuit Court Judge Karl Sakamoto heard a legal challenge to the marriage bill filed by Representative Bob McDermott, who contended that the 1998 constitutional amendment prohibited the State Legislature from allowing same-sex marriage. The lawsuit sought to prevent any government official from issuing a marriage license until the question of constitutionality was decided. On November 14, Judge Sakamoto ruled that the constitutional amendment in question did not force the State Legislature to define marriage as between "one man and one woman", and that it only gave the Legislature the power to reserve marriage to opposite-sex couples if it chose to do so, and that "after all the legal complexity of the court's analysis, the court will conclude that same-sex marriage in Hawaii is legal." The court granted the state's motion to dismiss the lawsuit, McDermott v. Abercrombie, on January 29, 2014. An appeal of the dismissal of the McDermott case was heard in the Hawaii Supreme Court, with oral arguments occurring on December 18, 2014. On May 27, 2015, following the retitling of the case to McDermott v. Ige, with the election of David Ige as governor, the court ruled that the appellants did not have standing to challenge the constitutionality of the Hawaii Marriage Equality Act. Another challenge, Amsterdam v. Abercrombie, was filed by a Hawaii resident on November 25, 2013. On February 19, 2014, Hawaii District Court Judge Susan Oki Mollway found that the plaintiff lacked standing and dismissed the challenge. In August 2016, the Ninth Circuit Court of Appeals upheld the case's dismissal.

=== Economic impact ===
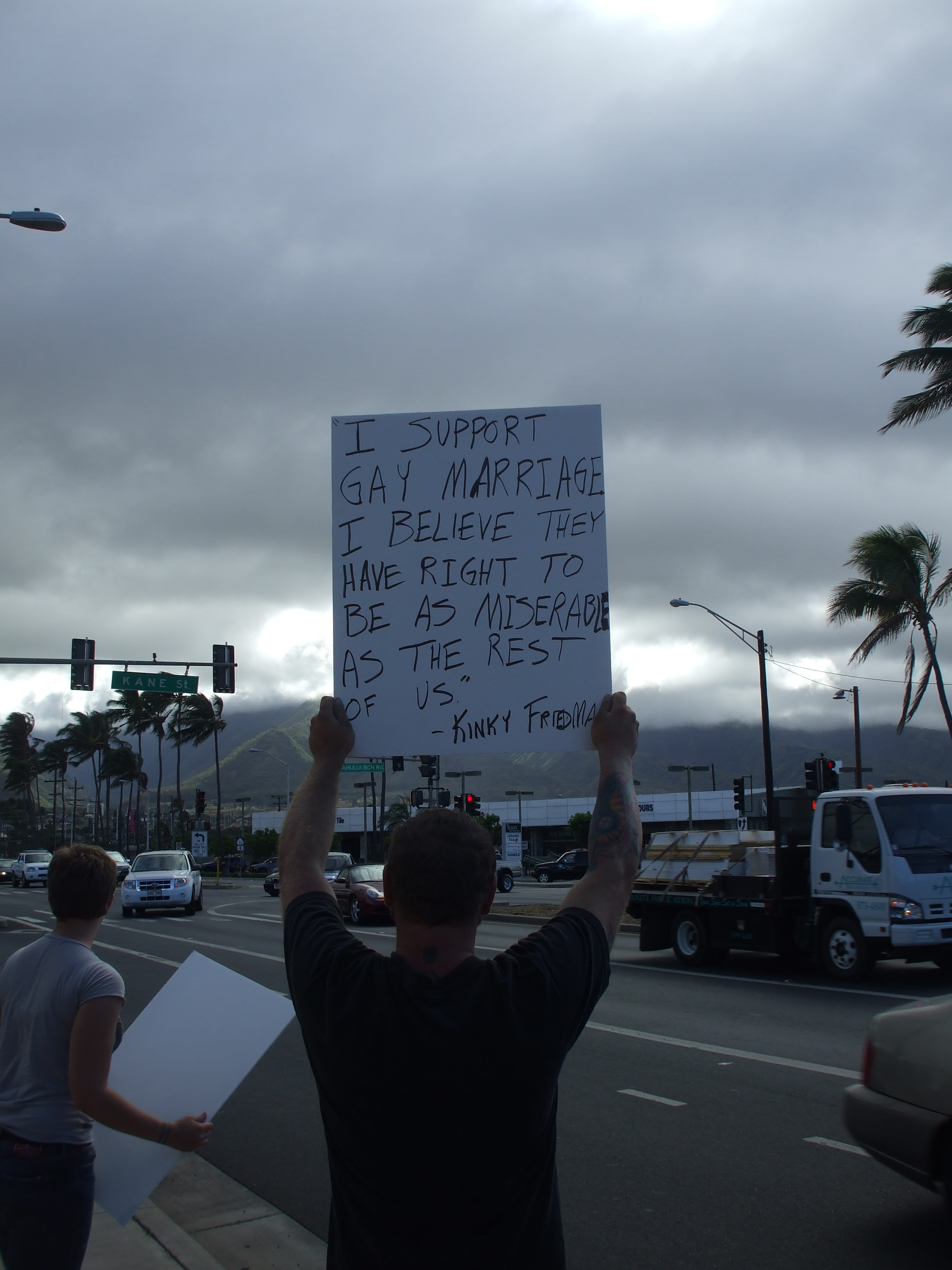
Sign in support of same-sex marriage with a quote attributed to Kinky Friedman in Kahului, 2010

A June 2010 study conducted by the University of California, Los Angeles indicated that same-sex couples would spend between $4.2 and $9.5 million on their wedding celebrations if allowed to marry in Hawaii. Out-of-state guests would spend an additional $17.8 to $40.3 million, which would in turn create 193 to 333 new jobs in Hawaii primarily in the events and travel industries. The figures in the study were estimated based on a four-year period. A July 2013 study conducted by the University of Hawaii estimated an additional $217 million in visitor spending over the following three years if Hawaii legalized same-sex marriage. Analysis published in 2015 by NerdWallet estimated the annual economic impact of same-sex marriage in Hawaii at approximately $26.6 million.

=== Marriage statistics and notable weddings ===
By June 30, 2015, 4,028 same-sex couples had married in Hawaii since legalization on December 2, 2013, making up 10.5% of the state's 38,254 marriages contracted in that time. According to the Hawaii Department of Health, 8,508 same-sex marriages were performed between 2013 and 2018, mostly in Honolulu County (4,084), followed by Maui (2,346), (Note: Including Kalawao County) Kauaʻi (1,051) and Hawaii (1,027) counties.

The 2020 U.S. census showed that there were 3,726 married same-sex couple households (1,884 male couples and 1,842 female couples) and 2,312 unmarried same-sex couple households in Hawaii. 13,176 same-sex marriages had been performed in Hawaii by the end of December 2025.

In December 2013, Genora Dancel, one of the plaintiffs in Baehr, married her partner Kathryn Dennis in a ceremony in Honolulu. In October 2017, Abigail Kinoiki Kekaulike Kawānanakoa, a granddaughter of David Kawānanakoa, the founder of the House of Kawānanakoa and through his mother, Victoria Kinoiki Kekaulike, the nephew of Queen Kapiʻolani, married her partner Veronica Gail Worth in Honolulu. The couple were married in a ceremony performed at the home of Justice Steven Levinson. This was the first same-sex marriage for a member of the Hawaiian royal family.

== Public opinion ==
Public opinion for same-sex marriage in Hawaii
Poll source	Dates administered	Sample size	Margin of error	Support	Opposition	Do not know / refused
Public Religion Research Institute	February 28 – December 8, 2025	156 adults	?	68%	29%	3%
Public Religion Research Institute	March 13 – December 2, 2024	173 adults	?	72%	25%	3%
Public Religion Research Institute	March 9 – December 7, 2023	157 adults	?	70%	29%	1%
Public Religion Research Institute	March 11 – December 14, 2022	?	?	69%	30%	1%
Public Religion Research Institute	March 8 – November 9, 2021	?	?	69%	29%	2%
Public Religion Research Institute	January 7 – December 20, 2020	176 adults	?	66%	26%	8%
Public Religion Research Institute	April 5 – December 23, 2017	298 adults	?	68%	20%	12%
Public Religion Research Institute	May 18, 2016 – January 10, 2017	438 adults	?	68%	25%	7%
Public Religion Research Institute	April 29, 2015 – January 7, 2016	239 adults	?	61%	29%	10%
New York Times/CBS News/YouGov	September 20 – October 1, 2014	1,319 likely voters	± 3.6%	59%	26%	15%
Public Religion Research Institute	April 2, 2014 – January 4, 2015	195 adults	?	64%	31%	5%
Civil Beat	October 9–10, 2013	819 registered voters	± 3.4%	44%	44%	12%
QMark Research	July 26–30, 2013	442 adults	?	54%	31%	15%
Anzalone Liszt Grove Research	January 14–18, 2013	500 residents	?	55%	37%	8%
Civil Beat	2012	1,162 registered voters	± 2.9%	37%	51%	12%
Civil Beat	2012	? likely voters	± 2.9%	40%	49%	11%
Civil Beat	2012	? non-voters	± 2.9%	27%	57%	16%
Public Policy Polling	October 13–16, 2011	568 voters	± 4.1%	49%	40%	11%

== See also ==
- LGBT rights in Hawaii
- Same-sex marriage in the United States
- Reciprocal beneficiary relationships in Hawaii
- Recognition of same-sex unions in Oceania
