= Hawaii Marriage Equality Act =

2013 Hawaiʻi state law allowing same-sex marriages

Hawaii Marriage Equality Act of 2013

Hawaii State Legislature
- Long title: An Act Relating to Equal Rights
- Citation: Act 1, 2nd Special Session, Session Laws of Hawaii 2013
- Territorial extent: State of Hawaii
- Passed by: Hawaii State Legislature
- Passed: November 12, 2013
- Signed by: Governor Neil Abercrombie
- Signed: November 13, 2013
- Commenced: December 2, 2013

Legislative history
- Bill title: SB1
- Bill citation: Senate Bill No. 1
- Introduced by: Brickwood Galuteria
- Committee report: House Standing Committee Report No. 4

Summary
- Recognizes marriages between individuals of the same sex. Extends to same-sex couples the same rights, benefits, protections, and responsibilities of marriage that opposite-sex couples receive.
- Status: In force

LGBTQ rights in Hawaii

Baehr v. Lewin (1993)
Baehr v. Miike (1996, 1999)
Constitutional Amendment 2 (1998)
House Bill 444 (2009)
Senate Bill 232 (2011)
Hawaii Marriage Equality Act (2013)
Amendment 1 (2024)

Equality Hawaii

LGBTQ rights in the United States
Same-sex marriage in Hawaii
Reciprocal beneficiary relationships in Hawaii
LGBTQ history in Hawaii

The Hawaii Marriage Equality Act of 2013 is legislation passed by the Hawaii State Legislature as Senate Bill 1 (SB1) and signed by Governor Neil Abercrombie which legalized same-sex marriage in the U.S. state of Hawaii. Prior to the bill's enactment, same-sex couples in the state of Hawaii were allowed to form civil unions (since 2012) or reciprocal beneficiary relationships (RBRs, since 1997); however, civil unions are both legally limited to civil officials in their performance and unrecognized by the federal government, and RBRs are even more limited by the rights and privileges accorded.

== History ==
=== Before the special session ===
In January 2013, a bill was introduced in the Hawaii House of Representatives and Senate that would legalize same-sex marriage. Despite the support of Governor Abercrombie and the Hawaii Congressional delegation, the Legislature adjourned without voting on the legislation.

In July 2013, following the U.S. Supreme Court rulings in United States v. Windsor and Hollingsworth v. Perry, lawmakers considered a special session to vote on the legislation, but House and Senate leaders said they did not have the required two-thirds majority to call a special session. The Legislature's regular session resumes in January 2014, unless Governor Abercrombie calls a special session, which he says is "very likely". On August 19, a group of religious leaders in Hawaii signed a resolution calling on the state to enact a same-sex marriage law. On the same day, Governor Abercrombie told a gathering of state Democrats: "I think we can put together something that can achieve a solid majority, that will give us the opportunity to establish marriage equity in the state of Hawaii commensurate with the recent Supreme Court decisions, and will satisfy and resolve the issues that are presently before the appeals court on the mainland." On August 22, Hawaii State House Speaker Joseph Souki acknowledged that a majority of House lawmakers supported same-sex marriage, indicating that both houses of the legislature have majorities that would support same-sex marriage legislation in a special session. On the same day, State Representative Denny Coffman, a supporter of same-sex marriage, announced his support of a special session, which he had previously opposed when unaware that the governor's office and the State Attorney General's office were working on draft legislation. On August 29, Governor Abercrombie released a draft bill and said he would let lawmakers review it before deciding whether to call a special session. On the same day, The State Central Committee of the Democratic Party of Hawaii unanimously approved a resolution calling on state lawmakers to approve a same-sex marriage bill immediately.

The Roman Catholic Bishop of Honolulu, Larry Silva, sent a letter to legislators on August 22 asking them to support traditional marriage and protect religious freedom by opposing same-sex marriage legislation. He then wrote a letter to parishioners published August 24-5 that said that a special session "could happen any day" and asked for prayers "for a change of heart and the formation of an informed conscience" and for courteous lobbying efforts. He described prohibiting same-sex marriage as a "just" form of discrimination, warned that legalization of polygamy and incest would follow, and described children raised by same-sex parents as "the greatest casualties" of legalization. He asked: "Would churches that refuse to celebrate same-sex marriage because of deeply held religious convictions be deprived of the freedom to live those convictions?" and "Would Christians, Muslims, and others who believe that homosexual acts are contrary to God's law be persecuted for holding on to those beliefs?"

=== Legislature special session ===
On September 9, Governor Abercrombie announced that he was calling the Hawaii State Legislature into special session on October 28 to consider the same-sex marriage bill. The bill had wide support in the Senate as well as the required majority in the House.

On October 28, the Senate Committee on Judiciary and Labor debated and passed same-sex marriage legislation in a 5–2 vote, sending the bill to a full Senate vote. On October 30, the Senate approved the legislation in a 20–4 vote, sending the bill to the House. The bill was then debated by the joint House Committees on Judiciary and on Finance for several days beginning October 31, as 5,184 people signed up to testify. By the end of November 4, all initial testifiers had been heard. During the hearings, opponents of the bill were suspected of having people sign up to testify multiple times under different names to prolong the hearing process. On November 5, both House committees passed same-sex marriage legislation (Judiciary committee 8 to 5 and Finance committee 10 to 7), sending the bill to a full House vote.

Following extensive public debate and an attempted 'citizens' filibuster' of the legislation to block its progress, the full state House advanced the same-sex marriage bill to a final vote 30–18, a key hurdle for the measure that would allow same-sex couples to marry while also expanding a religious exemption amendment beyond what the Senate had approved. On November 8, the House then passed the bill on its third (and final) reading, 30–19. As the House amended the bill, the Senate also needed to approve the expanded religious exemption amendment for the bill to become law. The Senate voted 19–4 in favor of the amended bill on November 12, and the final version of the bill was signed into law by Governor Abercrombie on November 13. The law went into full effect on December 2, 2013.

Vote Tallies
	Senate First Reading (Oct 28)	Senate JDL Committee (Oct 28)	Senate 3rd Reading (Oct 30)	House JUD Committee (Nov 5)	House FIN Committee (Nov 5)	House 2nd Reading (Nov 6)	House 3rd Reading (Nov 8)	Senate Final Reading (Nov 12)
Senate								
Rosalyn Baker (D)	Yes		Yes					Yes
Suzanne Chun Oakland (D)	Yes		Yes					Yes
Donovan Dela Cruz (D)	Yes		Yes					Excused
J. Kalani English (D)	Yes		Yes					Yes
Will Espero (D)	Yes		Yes					Yes
Mike Gabbard (D)	Yes	No	No					No
Brickwood Galuteria (D)	Yes	Yes	Yes					Yes
Josh Green (D)	Yes		Yes					Yes
Clayton Hee (D)	Yes	Yes	Yes					Yes
David Ige (D)	Yes		Yes					Yes
Les Ihara, Jr. (D)	Yes	Yes	Yes					Yes
Gil Kahele (D)	Yes		Yes					Yes
Gilbert S. C. Keith-Agaran (D)	Yes		Yes					Yes
Michelle Kidani (D)	Yes		Yes					Yes
Donna Mercado Kim (D)	Yes		No					No
Ron Kouchi (D)	Yes		No					No
Clarence K. Nishihara (D)	Yes		Yes					Yes
Russell Ruderman (D)	Yes		Yes					Yes
Maile Shimabukuro (D)	Yes	Yes	Yes					Yes
Sam Slom (R)	No	No	No					No
Malama Solomon (D)	Yes	Yes	Yes					Yes
Brian Taniguchi (D)	Yes		Yes					Excused
Laura Thielen (D)	Yes		Yes					Yes
Jill N. Tokuda (D)	Yes		Yes					Yes
Glenn Wakai (D)	Yes		Excused					Yes
House of Representatives								
Henry Aquino (D)						No	No	
Karen Awana (D)						No	No	
Della Au Belatti (D)				Yes		Yes	Yes	
Tom Brower (D)				Yes		Yes	Yes	
Rida Cabanilla (D)						Excused	Excused	
Romy Cachola (D)						Excused	No	
Mele Carroll (D)				No		No	No	
Isaac Choy (D)						Excused	Excused	
Denny Coffman (D)				Yes		Yes	Yes	
Ty Cullen (D)					No	No	No	
Cindy Evans (D)						Yes	Yes	
Richard Fale (R)						No	No	
Beth Fukumoto (R)					No	No	No	
Faye Hanohano (D)						Yes	Yes	
Sharon Har (D)				No		No	No	
Mark Hashem (D)					Yes	Yes	Yes	
Linda Ichiyama (D)						Yes	Yes	
Kaniela Ing (D)					Yes	Yes	Yes	
Ken Ito (D)				No		No	No	
Aaron Ling Johanson (R)					No	No	No	
Jo Jordan (D)					No	No	No	
Derek Kawakami (D)				Yes		Yes	Yes	
Bertrand Kobayashi (D)					Yes	Yes	Yes	
Chris Lee (D)				Yes		Yes	Yes	
Nicole Lowen (D)					Yes	Yes	Yes	
Sylvia Luke (D)					Yes	Yes	Yes	
Lauren Matsumoto (R)						No	No	
Bob McDermott (R)				No		No	No	
Angus McKelvey (D)						Yes	Yes	
John Mizuno (D)						Yes	Yes	
Dee Morikawa (D)					Yes	Yes	Yes	
Mark Nakashima (D)						Yes	Yes	
Scott Nishimoto (D)					Yes	Yes	Yes	
Takashi Ohno (D)						Yes	Yes	
Richard Onishi (D)					Yes	Yes	Yes	
Marcus Oshiro (D)						No	No	
Karl Rhoads (D)				Yes		Yes	Yes	
Scott Saiki (D)						Yes	Yes	
Calvin K.Y. Say (D)						Yes	Yes	
Joseph M. Souki (D)						Yes	Yes	
Mark Takai (D)						Yes	Yes	
Gregg Takayama (D)					Yes	Yes	Yes	
Roy Takumi (D)						Yes	Yes	
Cynthia Thielen (R)				Yes		Yes	Yes	
James Tokioka (D)					No	No	No	
Clift Tsuji (D)				No		No	No	
Gene Ward (R)					No	No	No	
Justin Woodson (D)					No	No	No	
Jessica Wooley (D)				Yes		Yes	Yes	
Ryan Yamane (D)						No	No	
Kyle Yamashita (D)					Yes	Yes	Yes	

== Public reaction ==
Hundreds of people appeared at the State Capitol demonstrating in support and in opposition to the bill from the day of a key House vote on November 6 through the final Senate vote on November 12. To maintain security, the House and Senate Sergeants-at-Arms divided space in the Capitol rotunda and on the sidewalk fronting Beretania Street between supporters and opponents, and set up barricades to physically separate the two groups.

=== Lawsuit ===
A lawsuit was filed during the special legislative session by State Representative Bob McDermott, a Republican member of the House who was opposed to same-sex marriage. The lawsuit sought a temporary injunction against implementing SB1, and challenged the constitutionality of the bill. Rep. McDermott and other plaintiffs based the lawsuit on the claim that voters believed that Hawaii Constitutional Amendment 2 of 1998 only allowed the Legislature to ban same-sex marriage and simultaneously barred the reverse. Circuit Court Judge Karl Sakamoto denied the request for the injunction on November 14, ruling that "the court will conclude that same-sex marriage in Hawaii is legal". The state filed a motion to dismiss the lawsuit in December 2013, which was granted on January 29, 2014. The Hawaii Supreme Court ruled on May 27, 2015 that Rep. McDermott and other plaintiffs did not show any injury from the enactment of the Hawaii Marriage Equality Act, meaning they did not have standing to challenge the law, and dismissed their case.

== See also ==
- Same-sex marriage legislation in the United States
- Other states that have legalized same-sex marriage by statute:
  - Delaware
  - Illinois
  - Minnesota
  - New Hampshire
  - New York (statute)
  - Rhode Island
  - Vermont (statute)
