= LGBTQ history in Hawaii =

LGBTQ rights in Hawaii

Baehr v. Lewin (1993)
Baehr v. Miike (1996, 1999)
Constitutional Amendment 2 (1998)
House Bill 444 (2009)
Senate Bill 232 (2011)
Hawaii Marriage Equality Act (2013)
Amendment 1 (2024)

Equality Hawaii

LGBTQ rights in the United States
Same-sex marriage in Hawaii
Reciprocal beneficiary relationships in Hawaii
LGBTQ history in Hawaii

In Hawaii, the LGBTQ laws have been evolving for the past hundred years. In the pre-19th century, the influence of Polynesian culture led to a more open-minded state. After the first Christian missionaries began arriving in Hawaii, strict sodomy laws were enacted. Territory v. Bell (1958) was the last sodomy case argued in Hawaii. After the turn of the 20th century, LGBTQ issues began being taken to and decided by the Supreme Court. In 2013, Hawaii voted in favor of gay marriage, and marriage licenses began to be issued to LGBTQ couples. The changes in LGBTQ laws and policies in Hawaii were reviewed the King Kamehameha V Judiciary History Center exhibition "Kaulike No Na Mea A Pau: Toward Queer Justice in Hawai'i" .

== Pre-19th century ==
In the Polynesian culture, which had spread to Hawaii, the māhū were classified as a third gender of person alongside male and female persons.

Aikāne relationships were widely practiced and accepted by precolonial Hawaiian society.

== 19th century ==
The first Christian missionaries to arrive in Hawaii were adept at encouraging locals and officials to convert to Christianity and observe Christian morality, succeeding in converting Kamehameha III. Under Kamehameha III, the Blue Laws were enacted in 1833, prohibiting a number of activities which were common to the Hawaiian population. A set of three statutes enacted in 1844 would criminalize vagrancy, lewdness and undefined crimes. An explicit sodomy law was enacted in 1850, punishing offenders with a fine of up to $1,000 and confinement at hard labor for up to 20 years. Eventually, an 1876 law allowed trial juries to convict offenders of assault to commit sodomy if actual sodomy could not be proven.

The first reported sodomy trial case before the Hawaii Supreme Court (by this time under the Republican government), Republic of Hawaii v. Edwards (1898), resulted in a conviction.

== 20th century ==
However, in 1900's Ex Parte Edwards, the defendant from the prior trial was ordered to be released by the Territorial Supreme Court, as his prior trial under the Republican government had taken place without an indictment, as was required by U.S. law. It was recently discovered that the sole witness in the trial recanted his testimony

Numerous convictions would be upheld by the Supreme Court for the first few decades of the 20th century. The 1949 "disorderly conduct" law enacted in the Territory also prohibited solicitation or loitering of same-sex sexual favors in public places.

=== 1950–1969 ===
In 1958, the last reported Supreme Court case of sodomy in Hawaii, Territory v. Bell, held that persons of the opposite sex could also be convicted for the offense of sodomy.

=== 1970–1989 ===
In 1972, the criminal code was substantially revised. Among other things, the revision retained the abrogation of common-law crimes, eliminated the solicitation provision of the disorderly conduct law, abolished the crime against nature law and set varying ages of consent for different sexual activities.

The first pride celebration in Hawaii was a 1974 march held in Honolulu.

In 1978, the constitution was amended to provide the right to privacy for the first time. Despite the State v. Mueller (1983) ruling which interpreted this amendment conservatively and ruled out any consideration for sexual privacy, the State legislature acted in 1986 to lower the age of consent to 14 years of age, the lowest in the nation at the time.

=== 1990–1994 ===
On December 10, 1990, three same-sex couples applied for marriage licenses at the Hawaii Department of Health. When denied licenses, the couples sue to have the prohibition on licenses for same-sex couples declared unconstitutional and discriminatory, resulting in Baehr v. Miike (originally Baehr v. Lewin). After the case was dismissed by the trial court, the couples appealed to the State Supreme Court. In the plurality opinion delivered by Judge Steven H. Levinson in 1993, the court ruled that while the right to privacy in the Hawaii state constitution does not include a fundamental right to same-sex marriage, denying marriage to same-sex couples constituted discrimination based on sex in violation of the constitutional right to equal protection. The court remanded the case to the trial court, instructing that "in accordance with the 'strict scrutiny' standard, the burden will rest on Lewin to overcome the presumption that HRS § 572-1 [the state's marriage statute] is unconstitutional by demonstrating that it furthers compelling state interests and is narrowly drawn to avoid unnecessary abridgments of constitutional rights."

=== 1995–1999 ===
In 1996, in Baehr v. Miike, Judge Kevin K.S. Chang ruled that the State did not meet its evidentiary burden. It did not prove that the State had a compelling interest in denying marriage licenses to same-sex couples and even assuming that it had it did not prove that HRS § 572-1 was narrowly tailored to avoid unnecessary abridgement of constitutional rights. He enjoined the State from refusing to issue marriage licenses to otherwise-qualified same-sex couples. The following day Chang stayed his ruling, acknowledging the "legally untenable" position couples would be in should the Hawaii Supreme Court reverse him on appeal.

In 1997, reciprocal beneficiary relationships were enacted into law by the State Legislature, marking the first state recognition of same-sex couples. It was intended to be an alternative to the same-sex marriages which were currently being debated in the Supreme Court trial.

In 1998, the legislature referred Constitutional Amendment 2, a constitutional amendment empowering the Hawaii State Legislature to limit marriage to mixed-sex couples, to the plebiscite for approval. The amendment won and was enacted by a total of 69.2–28.6%.

On December 9, 1999, the Hawaii Supreme Court, following the passage of the amendment, ruled that "The passage of the marriage amendment placed HRS § 572-1 on new footing. The marriage amendment validated HRS § 572-1 by taking the statute out of the ambit of the equal protection clause of the Hawai'i Constitution, at least insofar as the statute, both on its face and as applied, purported to limit access to the marital status to opposite-sex couples. Accordingly, whether or not in the past it was violative of the equal protection clause in the foregoing respect, HRS § 572-1 no longer is. In light of the marriage amendment, HRS § 572-1 must be given full force and effect." Because the remedy sought by the plaintiffs – access to marriage licenses – was no longer available, this reversed Chang's ruling and remanded the case for entry of judgment in favor of the defendant.

== 21st century ==
=== 2001–2009 ===
In 2001, the Legislature reversed itself and raised the age of consent from 14 to 16. When then-Governor Ben Cayetano vetoed the bill, the Legislature overrode his veto, the first legislative override in the state's history.

In 2006, Joe Bertram became the first openly LGBTQ member of the Hawaii State Legislature, serving in the office until 2011.

In 2009, Hawaii House Bill 444 became the first pro-civil unions bill to pass committee level. It was passed in February by the House of Representatives and was referred to the Senate for approval. However, it remained on the table for the 2009 session.

=== 2010–present ===
Hawaii House Bill 444 continued to remain in limbo in the Senate for much of the 2010 session. It was finally passed on April 29, 2010. Then-governor Linda Lingle vetoed the bill on July 6, saying that such matters regarding same-sex unions should be decided by a referendum.

The bill and its defeat figured in the following gubernatorial election, with Neil Abercrombie coming out in support of the bill and opponent Duke Aiona coming out against. Abercrombie won the election, and the Democratic majority in both chambers set to enact the bill. The new bill, Hawaii Senate Bill 232, was passed on January 26, 2011, by the Senate Judiciary and Labor Committee in a 3–2 vote and was passed by the full Senate 19–6 on January 28. A modification to the bill was then made in the House of Representatives before passage on February 11 by a vote of 31–19,; the Senate passed the modified bill on February 16 by a vote of 18–5.

Abercrombie's office confirmed after the passage of the bill by the Legislature that he would sign the bill within 10 legislative days of the passage. The bill was signed into law under the name Act 1 on February 23.

Blake Oshiro became the first openly gay majority leader in the House of Representatives on May 3, 2010, during the debate over the bill. He was re-elected to his seat in the election.

On December 17, 2013, Genora Dancel, one of the original plaintiffs who was denied the right to obtain her marriage license in the state of Hawaii back in 1990, legally married her partner Kathryn Dennis in Honolulu, Hawaii at Aliiolani Hale (The Hawaii Supreme Court). The honorable Dan Foley, who now serves as Intermediate Court of Appeals judge in Hawaii, presided over the marriage ceremony. Foley married the couple in the same Supreme Court room where he represented Dancel in 1990. Dancel and Dennis were married on the 23rd anniversary that Dancel was denied a marriage license.
