= Anti-marriage law =

Anti-marriage law may refer to:

Race-based anti-marriage laws:

- Anti-miscegenation laws, including:
- Prohibition of Mixed Marriages Act, in South Africa
- The Gesetz zum Schutze des deutschen Blutes und der deutschen Ehre, one of the Nuremberg Laws in Nazi Germany

Gender-based anti-marriage laws:

- The U.S. federal Defense of Marriage Act
- The Federal Marriage Amendment, which failed to pass
- Hawaii Constitutional Amendment 2 (1998)
- California Proposition 22 (2000)
- North Carolina Amendment 1
