= LGBTQ rights in Hawaii =

- Hawaii (US)
- Legal status: Legal since 1973
- Gender identity: Transgender people allowed to change gender
- Discrimination protections: Both sexual orientation and gender identity and expression (see below)

Family rights
- Recognition of relationships: Same-sex marriage since 2013 (Note: Same-sex marriages were also previously ruled unconstitutional in Hawaii in 1993, though no statewide enforcement of same-sex marriage was immediately issued); Civil unions since 2012; Reciprocal beneficiary relationships since 1997
- Adoption: Full adoption rights since 2012

Lesbian, gay, bisexual, transgender, and queer (LGBTQ) people in the U.S. state of Hawaiʻi enjoy the same rights as non-LGBTQ people. Same-sex sexual activity has been legal since 1973; Hawaii being one of the first six states to legalize it. In 1993, a ruling by the Hawaiʻi Supreme Court made Hawaii the first state to consider legalizing same-sex marriage. Following the approval of the Hawaii Marriage Equality Act in November 2013, same-sex couples have been allowed to marry on the islands. Additionally, Hawaii law prohibits discrimination on the basis of both sexual orientation and gender identity, and the use of conversion therapy on minors has been banned since July 2018. Gay and lesbian couples enjoy the same rights, benefits and treatment as opposite-sex couples, including the right to marry and adopt.

Same-sex relationships have been part of Hawaiian culture for centuries. The term aikāne refers to homosexual or bisexual relationships, which were widely accepted in pre-colonial Hawaiian society, and the term māhū refers to a "third gender" alongside male and female. The Christian missionaries, who arrived in the 19th century, were adept in converting the local population to Christianity. As a result, the first ever anti-gay law was enacted in 1850, prohibiting sodomy with 20 years' hard labor. During the 1960s and onwards, LGBTQ people entered into the public eye, which was followed by multiple pro-LGBT rights reforms, including the repeal of the sodomy law.

In modern times, Hawaii is notable for its LGBTQ-friendliness, with several establishments, accommodations, and festivals catering especially for gay tourists and couples. Recent opinion polls have found that LGBTQ rights enjoy high levels of support, with a 2019 survey by the Public Religion Research Institute showing that 73% of Hawaiʻi residents supported anti-discrimination legislation protecting LGBTQ people.

== History ==
Prior to European contact, same-sex relationships existed in the form of aikāne, an accepted tradition for both men and women in pre-colonial Hawaiian society. Likewise, the māhū formed a "third gender" role in Hawaiian culture, notably as priests and healers. The religious missionaries converted the local Hawaiians to Christianity and spread their moral ideals to the population, resulting in the introduction of negative attitudes towards homosexuality.

Although the first specific sodomy law in Hawaii was enacted in 1850, statutes passed in 1840 allowed villages to prosecute "any particular evils" against which no law existed. The 1850 anti-sodomy statute established a penalty of up to 20 years' hard labor and a fine of $1,000. It punished both heterosexual and homosexual conduct, and applied to consensual adults as well. The first recorded sodomy case occurred in 1898 in the case of Republic of Hawaii v. Edwards. In the 1922 case of Territory v. Wilson, the Hawaii Supreme Court unanimously ruled that fellatio (oral sex) was a "crime against nature". The last recorded sodomy case happened in 1958, in Territory v. Bell, in which the state Supreme Court unanimously confirmed that heterosexual sodomy was also a criminal offense.

== Law regarding same-sex sexual activity ==
Hawaii repealed its sodomy law in April 1972, and revised its sex offences laws in 1986 following a Supreme Court ruling which defended a Georgia ban on sodomy. The original sodomy law repeal was effective from the beginning of 1973.

The age of consent for homosexual activity was originally different from that of heterosexual activity. In 1986, the Hawaii State Legislature lowered the age of consent to 14, regardless of gender or sexual orientation. In 2001, it was raised to 16.

== Recognition of same-sex unions ==
LGBTQ rights in Hawaii

Baehr v. Lewin (1993)
Baehr v. Miike (1996, 1999)
Constitutional Amendment 2 (1998)
House Bill 444 (2009)
Senate Bill 232 (2011)
Hawaii Marriage Equality Act (2013)
Amendment 1 (2024)

Equality Hawaii

LGBTQ rights in the United States
Same-sex marriage in Hawaii
Reciprocal beneficiary relationships in Hawaii
LGBTQ history in Hawaii

=== Same-sex marriage legislation ===
On September 9, 2013, Governor Neil Abercrombie announced that he was calling the Hawaii State Legislature into a special session on October 28 to consider a same-sex marriage bill. The bill had wide support in the Senate as well as the required majority in the House. If approved, the bill would take effect on November 18.

On October 28, the Senate Committee on Judiciary and Labor passed the same-sex marriage legislation in a 5–2 vote, sending the bill to a full Senate vote. On October 30, the Senate approved the legislation in a 20–4 vote, sending the bill to the House. On October 31, the bill was debated by both the House Committee on Judiciary and the House Committee on Finance. The House, following extensive public debate and an attempted "citizens' filibuster" of the legislation, voted 30–19 on November 8 in favour of the legislation. The bill returned to the Senate for approval of House amendments which expanded religious exemptions, and the Senate provided final legislative approval on November 12, voting 19–4 in favor. Governor Neil Abercrombie signed the bill into law on 13 November; same-sex couples began marrying on December 2, 2013.

=== History prior to present day recognition of same-sex marriage ===
Hawaii's denial of marriage licenses to same-sex couples was successfully challenged in court, with the Hawaii Supreme Court finding restrictions on same-sex marriage unconstitutional in May 1993. In 1994, the state enacted a statute banning same-sex marriage. In November 1998, the voters of Hawaii voted 70 percent in favor of Hawaii Constitutional Amendment 2, which amended the State Constitution to allow the State Legislature to ban same-sex marriage. The constitutional amendment led the Hawaii Supreme Court to dismiss the lawsuit. On November 5, 2024, Hawaii held a referendum to repeal that 1998 anti-gay amendment in which voters passed by 55.9%.

Hawaii established reciprocal beneficiary relationships, a limited form of civil unions, for both same-sex and opposite-sex couples in 1997. Numerous legislative attempts to enact fuller civil unions equivalent with other jurisdictions' civil unions and domestic partnerships failed.

Governor Linda Lingle vetoed a civil union law in 2010. Governor Neil Abercrombie signed the same legislation on February 23, 2011, the first law he signed as governor. The law went into effect on January 1, 2012.

Hawaii has provided benefits to same-sex partners of state employees since 1997.

== Adoption and parenting ==
Hawaii allows all couples, including same-sex couples, to adopt. Lesbian couples can access in vitro fertilization (IVF) and artificial insemination treatment; state law recognizes the non-genetic, non-gestational mother as a legal parent to a child born via donor insemination, but only if the parents are married. Surrogacy is legal in Hawaii, as no specific law prohibits it, and courts have ruled in favor of gay male couples using the gestational surrogacy process.

In April 2021, the Hawaii Legislature passed a bill (HB1096) to recognise parentage for same-sex unmarried couples. Governor David Ige in July 2021 signed the bill into law, and it took effect immediately.

Another law, Act 298, took effect January 1, 2026. It implements gender-neutral definitions of parentage, and it clarifies that parentage can be determined by a voluntary acknowledgment or by adjudication by a court.

== Discrimination protections ==
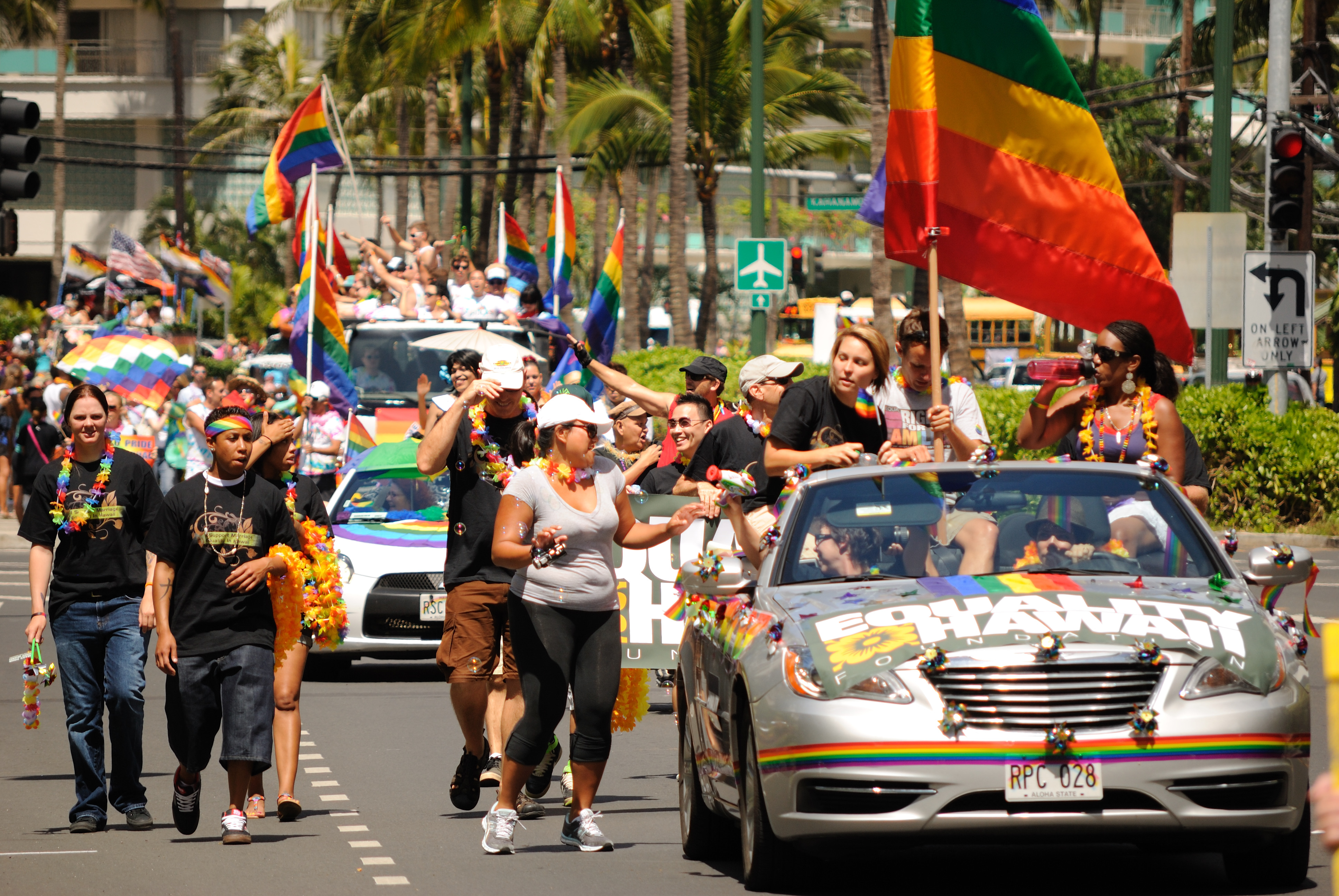
Participants at the 2012 Honolulu Pride parade

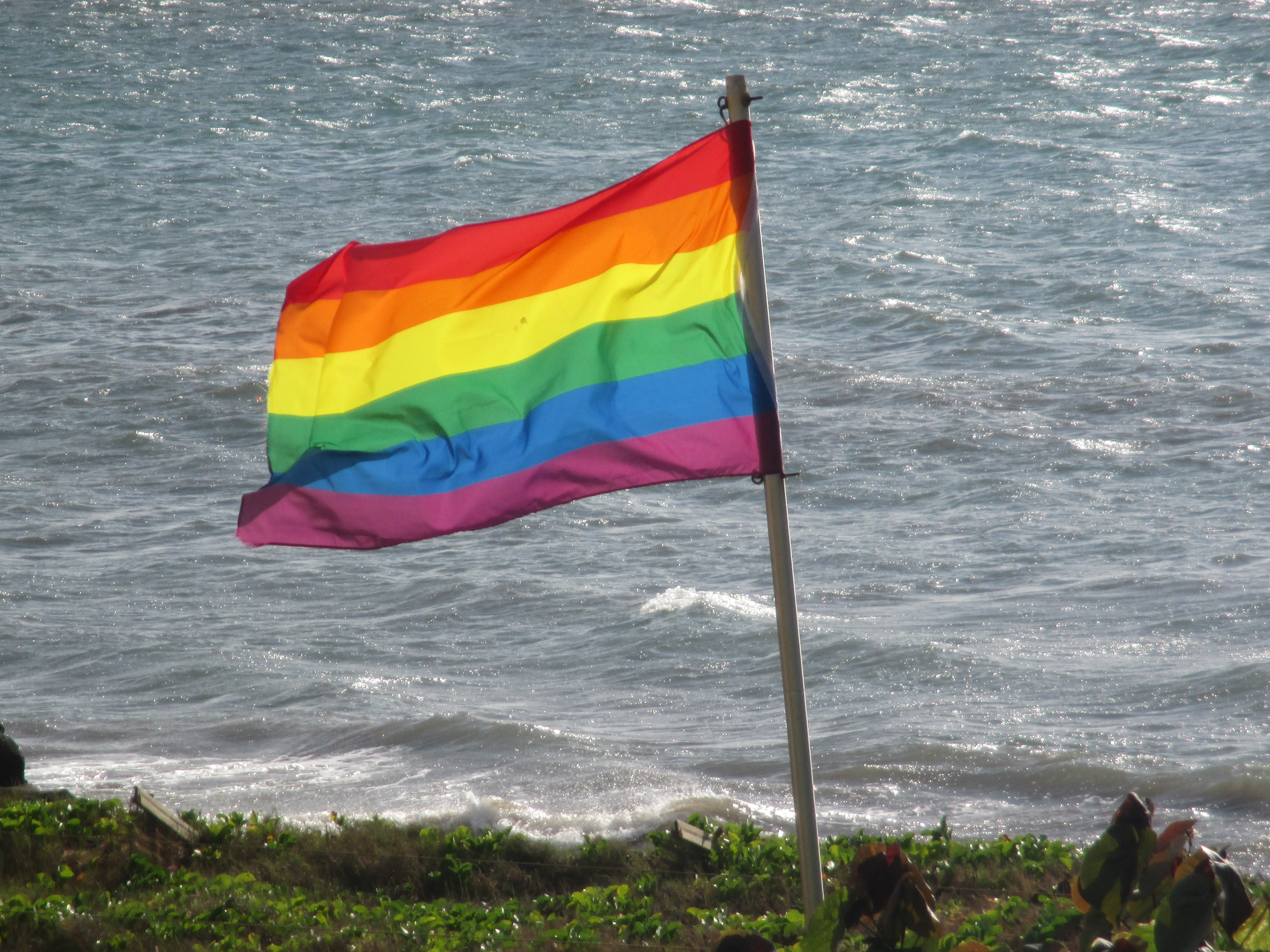
Rainbow flag at the Maui Sunseeker LGBT Resort

Hawaii law explicitly prohibits discrimination based on both sexual orientation and gender identity or expression in employment, public accommodations and housing.

The discrimination protections for sexual orientation in employment were added in 1991. In 2005, protections were extended to housing and in 2006 to public accommodations, both for sexual orientation and gender identity or expression. In 2011, gender identity or expression protections were extended to employment.

Moreover, the state's anti-bullying law prohibits bullying on the basis of race, color, national origin, sex, gender identity and expression, religion, physical and mental disability, sexual orientation, physical appearance and characteristic and socio-economic status. The law also explicitly includes cyberbullying and harassment, and applies to all public elementary schools and secondary school premises.

In July 2018, the Hawaii Legislature passed a bill, which was then signed into law by the Governor of Hawaii, to provide further protections for students under Title IX. The law ensures students are not denied access to programs or extracurricular activities because of their sexual orientation or gender identity. It went into effect on January 1, 2019.

In June 2022, 3 bills were signed into law by the Governor of Hawaii - namely (1) jury selections can not legally discriminate against individuals on the basis of sexual orientation and gender identity, (2) setting up a state based LGBTIQ+ commission, and (3) mandatory state based health insurance coverage for sexual reassignment surgery on transgender individuals. All 3 laws go into effect from January 1, 2023.

== Hate crime law ==
Hawaii has a law that addresses hate crime protection for both actual and/or perceived sexual orientation and gender identity or expression.

According to the statute:

- Sexual orientation is defined as heterosexuality, homosexuality or bisexuality and those "having a history of any one or more of these preferences or being identified with any one or more of these preferences."
- Gender identity or expression "includes a person's actual or perceived gender, as well as a person's gender identity, gender-related self image, gender-related appearance, or gender-related expression; regardless of whether that gender identity, gender-related self image, gender-related appearance, or gender-related expression is different from that traditionally associated with the person's sex at birth."

== Transgender rights ==
Previously, Hawaii's Department of Health issued a new birth certificate to a post-operative transgender person only upon receipt of a physician's affidavit verifying that the registrant had undergone sex reassignment surgery. On May 5, 2015, the Hawaii Legislature passed a bill to allow transgender people to change the gender marker on official identification documents without undergoing such surgery. Governor David Ige signed the bill into law on July 14, 2015, and the legislation went into effect immediately. Transgender people can now apply to change the gender marker simply by request; to obtain an updated birth certificate, they must submit to the Department of Health a completed "Application for Amendment to Birth Record" form and an affidavit from a licensed physician. The Social Security Administration will issue an updated driver's license and state ID upon receipt of a "Gender Designation Form" completed by a medical or social professional confirming the applicant's gender identity.

Since July 1, 2016, Hawaii has banned discrimination based on gender identity or expression within insurance contracts. This also includes insurance coverage of sex reassignment surgeries.

In May 2019, the Hawaii State Legislature passed a bill to add "X" as a sex option on both driver's licenses and birth certificates. The bill passed the House by a voice vote and the Senate by a vote of 24–1. On June 26, 2019, Governor David Ige signed the bill into law, and it went into effect on July 1, 2020. Individuals can change the gender marker by request; no proof of medical documentation is required.

=== Health insurance planning ===
In May 2022, a bill passed the Hawaii Legislature that would explicitly now include transgender individuals within health insurance planning - with an "emergency clause" (effective immediately upon signature into law). Currently only biological male and female individuals can access health insurance planning since 1980 in Hawaii. The Governor of Hawaii signed the bill into law a month later and went into effect immediately.

== Conversion therapy ==
Since 2013, several bills had been introduced in Hawaii to legally ban conversion therapy on minors, but the bills went nowhere or lapsed for years.

In April 2018, both the Hawaii House of Representatives and the Hawaii Senate passed a bill to ban conversion therapy on minors. Due to different versions, the House and the Senate convened in a conference committee. In May 2018, the conference committee passed one version of the bill into a single concise format that was unanimously agreed to and the bill was subsequently signed into law by Governor David Ige. The law went into effect on July 1, 2018.

== Gay and trans panic defense ==
In April 2019, the Hawaii State Legislature passed a bill to abolish the gay and trans panic defenses. Due to different versions of the bill within each legislative chamber, a conference committee had to be set up to pass both versions of the bill, which it did on April 26. The bill was signed into law two months later on June 26, 2019, by Governor David Ige and went into effect immediately.

== Blood donation FDA rules ==
In 2023, the Food and Drug Administration (FDA) approved and implemented new blood donation rules to allow and permit gay and bi men - on the condition of being monogamous.

== Public opinion and demographics ==
A 2013 Williams Institute survey showed that 5.1% of the Hawaii adult population identified as LGBT. This was the highest in the United States, behind only the District of Columbia (10%).

A 2017 Public Religion Research Institute (PRRI) opinion poll found that 68% of Hawaii residents supported same-sex marriage, while 20% opposed it and 12% were unsure. The same poll also found that 74% of Hawaii residents supported an anti-discrimination law covering sexual orientation and gender identity, while 13% were opposed. Furthermore, 54% were against allowing businesses to refuse to serve gay and lesbian people due to religious beliefs, while 35% supported allowing such religiously based refusals.

Public opinion for LGBTQ anti-discrimination laws in Hawaii
Poll source	Date(s) administered	Sample size	Margin of error	% support	% opposition	% no opinion
Public Religion Research Institute	January 2-December 30, 2019	207	?	73%	21%	6%
Public Religion Research Institute	January 3-December 30, 2018	226	?	70%	22%	8%
Public Religion Research Institute	April 5-December 23, 2017	298	?	74%	13%	13%
Public Religion Research Institute	April 29, 2015-January 7, 2016	407	?	76%	21%	4%

== Summary table ==
Same-sex sexual activity legal	Yes (Since 1972)
Equal age of consent (16)	Yes
Anti-discrimination laws in every area	Yes (Both sexual orientation and gender identity or expression)
Same-sex marriage	Yes (Since 2013; constitutional ban repealed in 2024)
Recognition of same-sex couples (e.g. civil unions)	Yes (Since 1997)
Stepchild and joint adoption by same-sex couples	Yes (Since 2012)
Lesbian, gay and bisexual people allowed to serve openly in the military	Yes (Since 2011)
Transgender people allowed to serve openly in the military	No (Since 2025)
Intersex people allowed to serve openly in the military	(Current DoD policy bans "hermaphrodites" from serving or enlisting in the military)
Right to change legal gender	Yes
Third gender option	Yes (Since 2020)
Automatic parenthood on birth certificates for children of same-sex couples	Yes
LGBT anti-bullying law in schools and colleges	Yes
LGBT-inclusive sex education required to be taught in schools	Yes
Gay and trans panic defense banned	Yes
Conversion therapy banned on minors	Yes (Since 2018)
Intersex minors protected from invasive surgical procedures	No
Ban on book bans law implemented	No
Access to IVF for lesbian couples	Yes
Surrogacy arrangements legal for gay male couples	Yes
MSMs allowed to donate blood	Yes (Since 2023, on a FDA condition of being monogamous)

== See also ==
- LGBTQ history in Hawaii
- LGBTQ rights in the United States
- LGBT rights in Oceania
