= Reciprocal beneficiary relationships in Hawaii =

LGBTQ rights in Hawaii

Baehr v. Lewin (1993)
Baehr v. Miike (1996, 1999)
Constitutional Amendment 2 (1998)
House Bill 444 (2009)
Senate Bill 232 (2011)
Hawaii Marriage Equality Act (2013)
Amendment 1 (2024)

Equality Hawaii

LGBTQ rights in the United States
Same-sex marriage in Hawaii
Reciprocal beneficiary relationships in Hawaii
LGBTQ history in Hawaii

Since 1997, the U.S. state of Hawaii has offered reciprocal beneficiary registration for any adults who are prohibited by state law from marrying, including both same-sex and opposite-sex couples.

== Benefits ==
Reciprocal beneficiaries have access to a limited number of rights and benefits on the state level, including inheritance rights, workers compensation, the right to sue for wrongful death, health insurance and pension benefits for state employees, hospital and jail visitation rights, and healthcare decisionmaking. Hawaii's RBR status also offers partners the option to jointly own property as "Tenants by the Entirety."

== Requirements ==
There are no state residency or U.S. citizenship requirements. The two individuals entering into a reciprocal beneficiary relationship must both be at least 18 years of age, and cannot be married or in another reciprocal beneficiary relationship.

Individuals prohibited by state law from marrying one another include, but are not limited to, relationships such as brother and sister of the half as well as to the whole blood, uncle and niece, and aunt and nephew.

On January 1, 2012, civil unions conveying all marital rights to same-sex and opposite-sex couples became available in Hawaii. The civil union law did not affect the reciprocal beneficiary relationship eligibility requirements.

== Registration ==
Registration may be done only by mailing a notarized form to the state Department of Health in Honolulu, along with a fee (as of December 2006) of US$8.00. Termination of a reciprocal beneficiary relationship (which may be done by either party acting alone) is handled in the same way. The Department of Health, in turn, mails certificates of registration or termination to the two parties involved.

== Recognition ==
Hawaii's reciprocal beneficiary status is recognized by other jurisdictions as being notably weaker than other same-sex union laws. The state of New Jersey, for example, recognizes reciprocal beneficiary status as equivalent only to domestic partnerships, not civil unions in New Jersey.
