= Baehr v. Miike =

Lawsuit against Hawaii's prohibition of same-sex marriage

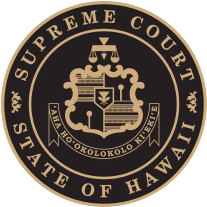
- Court: Supreme Court of Hawaii
- Full case name: Ninia Baehr, Genora Dancel, Tammy Rodrigues, Antoinette Pregil, Pat Lagon, Jeseph Mellilo, Plaintiffs-Appellees v. Lawrence H. Miike, in his official capacity as Director of the Department of Health, State of Hawaii, Defendant-Appellant
- Decided: December 9, 1999
- Citation: Supreme Court of Hawaii No. 20371

Case history
- Prior actions: Baehr v. Lewin, 74 Haw. 530, 852 P.2d 44 (1993), reconsideration and clarification granted in part, 74 Haw. 645, 852 P.2d 74 (1993); Baehr v. Miike, Circuit Court for the First Circuit, Hawaii No. 91-1394

Court membership
- Judges sitting: James S. Burns, Walter M. Heen, Robert G. Klein, Steven H. Levinson, Ronald Moon (original Justices)

Case opinions
- Passage of a state constitutional amendment empowering the state legislature to limit marriage to mixed-sex couples renders plaintiff-appellees' case moot. Circuit court reversed and remanded to enter judgment for defendant-appellant.

Keywords
- Same-sex marriage, Equal protection

LGBTQ rights in Hawaii

Baehr v. Lewin (1993)
Baehr v. Miike (1996, 1999)
Constitutional Amendment 2 (1998)
House Bill 444 (2009)
Senate Bill 232 (2011)
Hawaii Marriage Equality Act (2013)
Amendment 1 (2024)

Equality Hawaii

LGBTQ rights in the United States
Same-sex marriage in Hawaii
Reciprocal beneficiary relationships in Hawaii
LGBTQ history in Hawaii

Baehr v. Miike (originally Baehr v. Lewin) was a lawsuit in which three same-sex couples argued that Hawaii's prohibition of same-sex marriage violated the state constitution. Initiated in 1990, as the case moved through the state courts, the passage of an amendment to the state constitution in 1998 led to the dismissal of the case in 1999. The Full Faith and Credit Clause of the Constitution would have provided that all states would be potentially required to recognize marriages obtained in Hawaii, prompting the passage of the federal Defense of Marriage Act (DOMA) in 1996 under President Bill Clinton. Dozens of statutes and constitutional amendments banning same-sex unions at the state level also followed Baehr.

== Background ==
On December 17, 1990, three same-sex couples applied for marriage licenses at the Hawaii Department of Health with the encouragement of local gay rights activist William E. Woods. The three couples met the requirements of the state law that detailed eligibility requirements for marriage, except for being of the same sex. State health director John C. Lewin requested an opinion from the Hawaii Attorney General's office, which concluded on December 27 that under the United States Constitution the right to marry is fundamental, but only for different-sex couples. On April 12, 1991, the Department of Health denied the license applications, citing the Attorney General's opinion. On May 1 the couples initiated their lawsuit, Baehr v. Lewin, seeking to have the same-sex exclusion declared unconstitutional. They were represented by Dan Foley, an experienced local civil rights attorney. Lambda Legal Defense and Education Fund had declined to represent them as it debated the importance of marriage itself and whether taking the issue to court was a wise strategy.

== First decisions ==
On October 1, 1991, the trial court dismissed the suit. Plaintiffs appealed to the Supreme Court of Hawaii. The Court considered whether the Hawaii constitution's right to privacy included a fundamental right to same-sex marriage and concluded that it did not. The Court did find however that under the state's equal protection clause, denying marriage licenses to same-sex couples constituted discrimination based on sex that required justification by the state under the standard known as strict scrutiny. On May 5, 1993 (with clarification issued on May 27), the Supreme Court split in a 2-1-2 decision to remand the case to the trial court to determine if the state could meet that standard by demonstrating that denying marriage licenses to same-sex couples "furthers compelling state interests and is narrowly drawn to avoid unnecessary abridgments of constitutional rights." Justice Levinson, joined by Chief Justice Moon, wrote the plurality opinion, though Court of Appeals Judge (filling in for a recused Justice) James S. Burns wrote a concurrence of the judgment reaching the same conclusion as the plurality opinion, thus remanding the case back to the trial court.

== Legislative response ==
In response to the court's ruling, Hawaii enacted a new statute that defined marriage to include only different-sex couples and created the Commission on Sexual Orientation and the Law to study the issue of granting benefits to same-sex couples. Following the failure of the first Commission, a second Commission was established. While the Commissions studied the issue the case was stayed. The Commission issued its report on December 8, 1995. In examining the many benefits associated with marriage along with public policy reasons for extending such benefits to same-sex couples, the Commission recommended that the legislature open marriage to same-sex couples and that it create as well a comprehensive domestic partnership act to be open to all couples without respect to sex.

Following his appointment as State Director of Health, Lawrence H. Miike substituted for Lewin as defendant, changing the name of the case.

== Trial ==
Beginning on September 10, 1996, Judge Kevin S.C. Chang conducted the trial in the case of Baehr v. Miike, with the name of the new State Director of Health, Lawrence H. Miike, replacing that of his predecessor. Hawaii put forth five state interests it claimed were sufficiently "compelling" to allow it to bar same-sex couples from marrying. These interests were:

1. protecting the health and welfare of children and other persons
2. fostering procreation within a marital setting
3. securing or assuring recognition of Hawaii marriages in other jurisdictions
4. protecting the State's public fisc from the reasonably foreseeable effects of State approval of same-sex marriage in the laws of Hawaii
5. protecting civil liberties, including the reasonably foreseeable effects of State approval of same-sex marriages, on its citizens.

The state called four expert witnesses with specialties in psychology and sociology. The plaintiffs also called four expert witnesses with specialties in psychology, sociology and child development. On December 3, 1996, Judge Chang ruled that the state had not established any compelling interest in denying same-sex couples the ability to marry and that, even if it had, it failed to prove that the Hawaii statute was narrowly tailored to avoid unnecessary abridgement of constitutional rights. He instructed the state to issue marriage licenses to otherwise-qualified same-sex couples. The following day Chang stayed his ruling, acknowledging the "legally untenable" position couples would be in should the Supreme Court reverse him on appeal.

== Resolution ==
On November 3, 1998, Hawaii voters approved an amendment to the state constitution that allowed the state "to reserve marriage to opposite-sex couples." On December 9, 1999, the state Supreme Court ruled that the marriage amendment removed the plaintiffs' legal objections to the state's eligibility requirements for marriage and definition of marriage. The Court reversed Chang's ruling and remanded the case for entry of judgment in favor of the defendant.

== Impact ==
As Congress considered passing DOMA, the House Judiciary Committee's Report on the legislation in 1996 discussed the implications of the Baehr case at length and argued for passage because "a redefinition of marriage in Hawaii to include homosexual couples could make such couples eligible for a whole range of federal rights and benefits." It said the proposed statute:

...is a response to a very particular development in the State of Hawaii.... [T]he state courts in Hawaii appear to be on the verge of requiring that State to issue marriage licenses to same-sex couples. The prospect of permitting homosexual couples to "marry" in Hawaii threatens to have very real consequences both on federal law and on the laws (especially the marriage laws) of the various States.

In 1997, while the case was pending, and before the passage of the state constitutional amendment that reinforced the state's ban on same-sex marriage, the state responded to the recommendations of the Commission on Sexual Orientation and the Law by offering reciprocal beneficiary registration to any adults who were prohibited by state law from marrying, including same-sex couples, blood relatives, and housemates. The benefits that status provided were less than those of civil marriage.

== See also ==
- Same-sex marriage in Hawaii
- LGBT rights in Hawaii
