= Dennis Arakaki =

American politician and social worker

Majority Leader of the Hawaii House of Representatives
- In office 1998–1998
- Preceded by: Tom Okamura
- Succeeded by: Ed Case

Member of the Hawaii House of Representatives from the 30th district 37th (1986–1992) 28th (1992–2002)
- In office 1986–2006
- Preceded by: Dennis Nakasato
- Succeeded by: John Mizuno

Personal details
- Born: October 18, 1947 (age 78) Honolulu, Territory of Hawaii, U.S.
- Party: Democratic
- Education: University of Hawaiʻi at Mānoa
- Occupation: politician, social worker

Dennis A. Arakaki (born October 18, 1947) is an American politician and social worker.

Born in Honolulu, Hawaii, Arakaki graduated from Farrington High School. He then went to University of Hawaii at Manoa. He worked in health care planning. Arakaki served in the Hawaii House of Representatives from 1985 to 2006 as a Democrat.

Arakaki worked with Sen. Suzanne Chun Oakland to establish the Keiki Caucus for children and youth issues. He also created the Child and Adolescent Mental Health Task Force which was instrumental in improving the state's mental health system.
