= Hawaii Senate Bill 232 =

2011 Hawaii law

Senate Bill 232

Hawaii State Legislature
- Long title: Relating to Civil Unions
- Citation: Act 1, Regular Session, Session Laws of Hawaii 2011
- Territorial extent: State of Hawaii
- Passed by: Hawaii State Legislature
- Passed: February 16, 2011
- Signed by: Governor Neil Abercrombie
- Signed: February 23, 2011
- Commenced: January 1, 2012

Legislative history
- Bill title: SB232
- Bill citation: Senate Bill No. 232
- Introduced by: Brickwood Galuteria
- Committee report: House Standing Committee Report No. 156

Summary
- Extends the same rights, benefits, protections, and responsibilities of spouses in a marriage to partners in a civil union.
- Status: In force

LGBTQ rights in Hawaii

Baehr v. Lewin (1993)
Baehr v. Miike (1996, 1999)
Constitutional Amendment 2 (1998)
House Bill 444 (2009)
Senate Bill 232 (2011)
Hawaii Marriage Equality Act (2013)

Equality Hawaii

LGBTQ rights in the United States
Same-sex marriage in Hawaii
Reciprocal beneficiary relationships in Hawaii
LGBTQ history in Hawaii

Hawaii Senate Bill 232 is a 2011 law which legalizes state recognition of civil unions in the state after January 1, 2012. Initiated in the Hawaii Senate and substantively similar to 2010's Hawaii House Bill 444, which was vetoed by then-Governor Linda Lingle. SB232 was backed by her successor, Neil Abercrombie.

The bill was passed on January 26, 2011, by the Senate Judiciary and Labor Committee in a 3–2 vote and was passed by the full Senate 19-6 on January 28. A modification to the bill was then made in the House of Representatives before passage on February 11 by a vote of 31–19,; the Senate passed the modified bill on February 16 by a vote of 18–5.

Abercrombie's office confirmed after the passage of the bill by the Legislature that he would sign the bill within 10 legislative days of the passage, and the bill was signed into law as Act 1 on February 23.

The Hawaii Civil Union Act 2011 is still in force, despite Hawaii providing same-sex marriages since December 2, 2013, under the Hawaii Marriage Equality Act 2013.

== Overview ==
As of the passed modification of the bill by the House on February 11, the bill provides for an extension of the privileges provided by the current regime of reciprocal beneficiary relationships in the state. The extension will essentially make civil unions performed and recognized in Hawaii compatible with civil unions and domestic partnerships performed in other states of the United States where such unions are legalized for same-sex couples.
