= Daniel Foley (jurist) =

American retired attorney and judge

Associate Justice of the Supreme Court of Palau
- Incumbent
- Assumed office 2013
- Appointed by: Johnson Toribiong

Judge of the Hawaii Intermediate Court of Appeals
- In office October 2, 2000 – December 2016
- Appointed by: Ben Cayetano

Personal details
- Born: Daniel R. Foley; 1946 (age 79–80)
- Party: Democratic
- Spouse: Carlyn Tani
- Education: University of San Francisco (BA, JD)
- Occupation: Attorney, judge
- Known for: Baehr v. Miike

Daniel R. Foley (born 1946) is an American retired attorney and judge, who served on the Hawaii Intermediate Court of Appeals from 2000 to 2016. A civil rights attorney known for his support of legalizing same-sex marriage, Foley was appointed by Governor Ben Cayetano in July 2000 and confirmed in August of that year. Known primarily for representing three couples in Baehr v. Miike, the first American case in which gay couples sued a state for the right to marry, Foley was appointed to the Supreme Court of Palau as an Associate Justice in 2011.

== Early life and education ==
Daniel R. Foley received his bachelor's degree and his Juris Doctor degree from the University of San Francisco. Eventually becoming a Fellow at the American College of Civil Trial Mediators, Foley would go on to study mediation at the Mediation Center of the Pacific and Pepperdine School of Law.

=== PeaceCorps ===
After college, Foley went on to serve as a volunteer in the Peace Corps for two years, from 1969 to 1970. Foley volunteered in the Kingdom of Lesotho.

=== Early work in Micronesia ===
Though an American citizen, Foley was interested in the work of self-governance in Micronesia. Predominantly from 1975 to 1983, but throughout his career, he provided legal counsel to governmental bodies in the region. These included the Congress of the Trust Territory of the Pacific Islands, Congress of the Federated States of Micronesia, Palau National Congress, Tmk Legislature, Yap Legislature, Palau Legislature, Yap Constitutional Convention, Kosrae Constjtutional Convention, and the Voice of the Marshalls, alongside many local bodies.

== Career ==
Foley was an attorney in private practice from 1987 to 2000, the first two years as a solo practitioner and the remainder as a partner in Partington & Foley. The Baehr v. Miike case began in 1990 when three same-sex couples applied for marriage licenses at the Hawaii Department of Health at the encouragement of local gay rights activist William E. Woods. Though the prominent gay rights law firm Lambda Legal and his former employer, the American Civil Liberties Union, had both declined to represent the couples, Foley decided to take up the case on civil rights grounds. Though the challenge to Hawaii's law was unsuccessful before the Supreme Court of Hawaii, it would go on to be considered a pivotal case for gay rights and was cited by Justice Anthony Kennedy in the Obergefell v. Hodges decision that federally legalized same-sex marriage.

In 2011, part-time Associate Justice of the Supreme Court of Palau Janet Healy Weeks announced that she would be vacating the seat she was appointed to in 1993, in order to relocate to California. Johnson Toribiong, the President of Palau, announced on November 16, 2011, that he would appoint Daniel Foley to fill the vacancy. His experience with traditional and contemporary Micronesian leaders and governments was cited as key to his appointment. Foley began serving as an Associate Justice in 2013.

In April 2020, the Supreme Court of Hawaii appointed Foley as special master to oversee efforts to reduce overcrowding in the state's correctional facilities.

== Personal life ==
Foley is married to Carlyn Tani.

=== Politics ===
Foley supported Kim Coco Iwamoto for Lieutenant Governor of Hawaii in the 2018 Hawaii gubernatorial election, and chaired her unsuccessful Democratic campaign. Foley supported the passage of the Respect for Marriage Act, which was signed into law by President Joe Biden in December 2022.
