= Equality Hawaii =

American LGBTQ advocacy group

- The Equality Hawaii logo

- U.S. State of Hawaii
- Founded: November 16, 2007
- Location: Honolulu, Hawaii
- Region served: Hawaii
- Website: equalityhawaii.org
- Formerly called: Family Equality Coalition, Family Equality Foundation

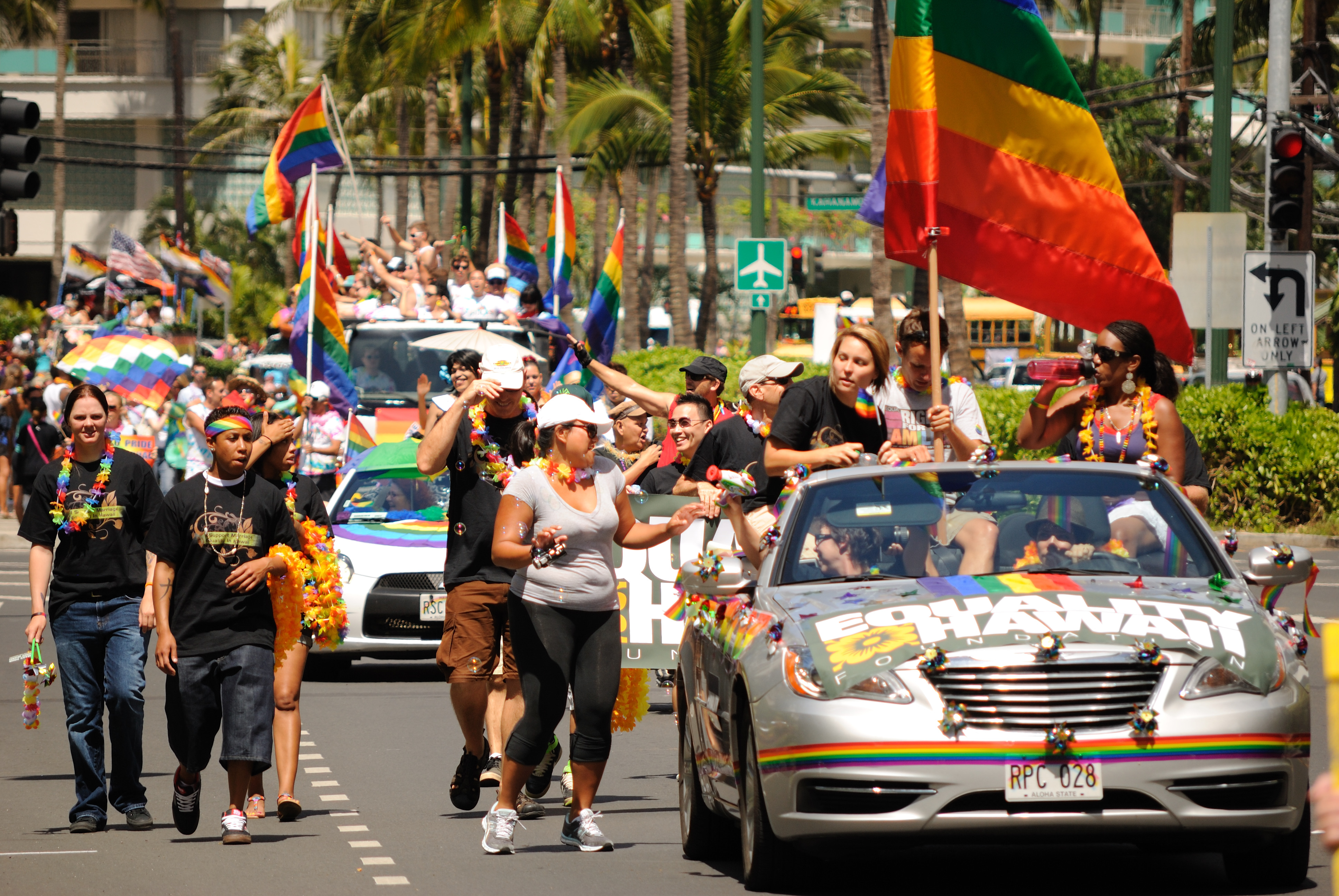
Equality Hawaii at Honolulu Pride Parade in June 2012

LGBTQ rights in Hawaii

Baehr v. Lewin (1993)
Baehr v. Miike (1996, 1999)
Constitutional Amendment 2 (1998)
House Bill 444 (2009)
Senate Bill 232 (2011)
Hawaii Marriage Equality Act (2013)
Amendment 1 (2024)

Equality Hawaii

LGBTQ rights in the United States
Same-sex marriage in Hawaii
Reciprocal beneficiary relationships in Hawaii
LGBTQ history in Hawaii

Equality Hawaii was a statewide political advocacy organization in Hawaii that advocated for lesbian, gay, bisexual, and transgender (LGBTQ) rights, including same-sex marriage.

== History ==
Equality Hawaii was founded as Family Equality Coalition on November 16, 2007, as a 501(c)(4) nonprofit corporation. It was founded based on community and expert input at the organization's first meeting in September 2007 after a civil unions bill was attempted in February 2007. The organization made an early commitment to advocating for same-sex marriage in Hawaii. The first general membership meeting was held in partnership with UNITE HERE Local 5 and featured Cleve Jones. In 2010, the board elected to change its name to Equality Hawaii to reflect its scope expanding beyond just same-sex marriage.

Originally named Family Equality Foundation, Equality Hawaii Foundation (EHF) was founded on October 27, 2009, as a 501(c)(3) nonprofit corporation. While its 501(c)(3) application was being approved by the Internal Revenue Service (IRS), the organization was fiscally sponsored by the Equality Federation Institute. This allowed the organization to immediately pursue grant funding. The organization received its official designation from the IRS on June 5, 2011.

Equality Hawaii Action Fund was founded August 13, 2010, as a 527 organization. It was formed in response to Governor of Hawaii Linda Lingle vetoing a 2010 civil unions bill; opponents of legal recognition of same-sex relationships had made public pledges to remove from office any legislators who supported civil unions; and Gubernatorial candidates Mufi Hannemann and Duke Aiona were promising to not only veto any future civil unions legislation, but put the issue on the ballot.

On February 16, 2011, a civil unions bill was passed and signed into law by Governor Abercrombie on February 23, 2011.

Equality Hawaii was a founding member and fiscal agent of Hawaii United for Marriage, a coalition of organizations that advocated for the Hawaii Marriage Equality Act, which was signed into law on November 13, 2013, by Governor Neil Abercrombie, and same-sex couples began marrying on December 2, 2013.

From 2013 to 2016, Equality Hawaii worked to pass key legislation to empower and protect Hawaii's LGBTQ community, enabling transgender people to change the gender identity maker on official documents and preventing health insurers from discriminating against them. In 2016 Equality Hawaii formed a strategic alliance to share networks and resources with the Hawaii LGBT Legacy Foundation, an organization dedicated to unifying, facilitating and empowering Hawaii's LGBTQ community.

Equality Hawaii ceased operations in January 2017.

== Structure ==
Equality Hawaii is often used to describe three separate organizations:

- Equality Hawaii — a 501(c)(4) organization
- Equality Hawaii Foundation — a 501(c)(3) organization
- Equality Hawaii Action Fund — a 527 organization

== Activities ==
Equality Hawaii activities and programs included:

- Hawaii Family Portraits
- Community education
- Media relations
- Community outreach
- Legislative lobbying
- Voter outreach

== See also ==
- LGBT rights in Hawaii
- Same-sex marriage in Hawaii
- List of LGBT rights organizations
