= 1998 Hawaii Amendment 2 =

Referendum on same-sex marriage

Constitutional Amendment 2
- Hawaii Marriage Amendment

Results
Choice	Votes	%
Yes	285,384	70.78%
No	117,827	29.22%
Valid votes	403,211	97.74%
Invalid or blank votes	9,309	2.26%
Total votes	412,520	100.00%
Registered voters/turnout	601,404	67.19%
County results
Yes
70–80%
60–70%
No vote

Constitutional Amendment 2 of 1998 amended the Constitution of Hawaii, granting the state legislature the power to prevent same-sex marriage from being conducted or recognized in Hawaii. Amendment 2 was the first constitutional amendment adopted in the United States that specifically targeted same-sex partnerships.

== Background ==
In 1993, the Hawaii State Supreme Court ruled in Baehr v. Lewin, 852 P.2d 44 (Haw. 1993), that refusing to grant marriage licenses to same-sex couples was discriminatory under that state's constitution. However, the court did not immediately order the state to begin issuing marriage licenses to same-sex couples; rather, it remanded the case to the trial court and ordered the state to justify its position. After the trial court judge rejected the state's justifications for limiting marriage to opposite-sex couples in 1996 (but stayed his ruling to allow the state to appeal to the Supreme Court again), the Hawaii State Legislature passed a proposed constitutional amendment during the 1997 session that would overrule the Supreme Court's 1993 ruling and allow the Legislature to ban same-sex marriage. This constitutional amendment appeared on the 1998 general election ballot as Constitutional Amendment 2.

LGBTQ rights in Hawaii

Baehr v. Lewin (1993)
Baehr v. Miike (1996, 1999)
Constitutional Amendment 2 (1998)
House Bill 444 (2009)
Senate Bill 232 (2011)
Hawaii Marriage Equality Act (2013)
Amendment 1 (2024)

Equality Hawaii

LGBTQ rights in the United States
Same-sex marriage in Hawaii
Reciprocal beneficiary relationships in Hawaii
LGBTQ history in Hawaii

== Content ==
The question that appeared on the ballot for voters was:

Shall the Constitution of the state of Hawaii be amended to specify that the Legislature shall have the power to reserve marriage to opposite-sex couples?

Amendment 2 differed from amendments that followed in other states in that it did not write a ban on same-sex marriage into the state's constitution; rather, it allowed the state legislature to enact such a ban. On November 3, 1998, Hawaii voters approved the amendment by a vote of 69.2–28.6%, and the state legislature exercised its power to ban same-sex marriage.

The language added by the amendment reads:

The legislature shall have the power to reserve marriage to opposite-sex couples.

— Article I, section 23, The Constitution of the State of Hawaii

== Later developments ==
On October 14, 2013, Hawaii Attorney General David M. Louie stated in a formal legal opinion that Amendment 2 does not prevent the state legislature from legalizing same-sex marriage, which it did in November 2013 with the Hawaii Marriage Equality Act.

On November 5, 2024, Hawaii held a referendum to remove the amendment from the state constitution. The measure passed by a vote of 55.9%-44.1%

== Results ==
Constitutional amendment
Choice	Votes	%
For	285,384	70.78
Against	117,827	29.22
Total	403,211	100.00
Valid votes	403,211	97.74
Invalid/blank votes	9,309	2.26
Total votes	412,520	100.00
Registered voters/turnout	601,404	68.59
Source: Hawaii Office of Elections (November 4, 1998). "1998 General Election Statewide Summary Report". Archived from the original on June 2, 2006.

=== By county ===
County	Yes		No		Margin		Total votes
County	#	%	#	%	#	%	Total votes
Hawaii	36,086	67.3%	16,015	29.8%	20,071	37.5%	52,101
Honolulu	201,851	69.3%	83,445	28.7%	118,406	40.6%	285,296
Kauaʻi	17,782	73.0%	5,948	24.4%	11,834	48.6%	23,730
Maui	29,665	68.4%	12,419	28.6%	17,246	39.8%	42,084
Totals	285,384	70.8%	117,827	29.2%	167,557	41.6%	403,211

== See also ==
- LGBT rights in Hawaii
- Same-sex marriage in Hawaii
