= First Unitarian Church of Honolulu =

- First Unitarian Church of Honolulu
- 21°19.799′N 157°50.678′W
- Address: 2500 Pali Highway, Honolulu, Hawaii
- Country: USA
- Denomination: Unitarian Universalist
- Website: uuhonolulu.org

History
- Founded: 1952

The First Unitarian Church of Honolulu is the largest Hawaii-based congregation within the Unitarian Universalist Association. It is located at 2500 Pali Highway in the Nu'uanu Valley.

The congregation was founded in 1952 as a lay fellowship. The fellowship was unusual for its time because its leadership consisted of women (Rosemary Mattson as chairwoman and Ruth Iams as program director) and because it made efforts to engage in interfaith dialogue with Jewish and Buddhist congregations in Honolulu.

In September 1969, the church made national headlines when it offered refuge to U.S. service members protesting the war in Vietnam. The service members were arrested by military police within the church grounds. The resulting action brought about an unsuccessful lawsuit filed by the church against the military - Bridges v. Davis, 443 F.2d 970 (9th Cir., 1971). The private memorial service for Madelyn Dunham, grandmother of US President Barack Obama, was held there in December 2008. It is also where President Obama attended Sunday School during his youth.

A new mission statement was adopted on April 15, 2012, to "boldly grow compassion, justice, and joy."

== Leaders ==
The Rev. Gene Bridges served the church from 1962 to 1970, responding to Rev. Dr. Martin Luther King, Jr.'s call to march from Selma to Alabama during the Civil Rights era.

The Rev. Mike Young was the church's minister from 1995 until 2009. After his retirement, the church went through a 2-year interim period, first under the Rev. Louise Ulrich from 2009 to 2010, then under the Rev. Leland Bond-Upson from 2010 to 2011.

The Rev. Doctor Jonipher Kūpono Kwong was called April 10, 2011. He began serving as minister as of August 15, 2011. Kwong is the church's first openly gay and first Asian-American minister since establishment. The Rev. Doctor Jonipher Kūpono Kwong resigned as minister June 30, 2015. Rev. T.J.FitzGerald served the church for five years before being called to the First Unitarian Church of Dallas. Rev. Dr. Gregory C. Carrow‑Boyd served the church from 2023- 2025.

Rev. Deborah Bond-Upson is the current minister of the church.
