= ACLU of Hawaiʻi =

Nonprofit organization in Hawaii

- American Civil Liberties Union of Hawaii
- Predecessor: Hawaii Civil Liberties Committee
- Formation: 1965
- Founder: Allan Saunders
- Type: Nonprofit (501(c)(4))
- Region served: Hawaii; American Samoa; Guam
- Parent organization: American Civil Liberties Union
- Website: https://acluhi.org

The ACLU of Hawaiʻi is an affiliate of the American Civil Liberties Union. As a 501(c)(4) nonprofit organization, it focuses on advocacy for civil rights and civil liberties in Hawaii, American Samoa and Guam.

== History ==
=== Formation ===
While the national American Civil Liberties Union (ACLU) was founded in 1920, there was no attempt to form a Hawaii affiliate until 1949. After multiple unsuccessful attempts, the ACLU of Hawaiʻi was officially founded in 1965.

The first attempt to form an ACLU affiliate in Hawaii took place in 1949 under the name Hawaii Civil Liberties Committee (HCLC). The HCLC was founded in response to the suspension of public school teachers John Reinecke and Aiko Reinecke after the couple were accused of engaging in "Communist activities", and circulated a petition defending them. It additionally lobbied against the formation of a committee on "unAmerican activities" in the Hawaii Territorial Legislature. However, the HCLC remained unaffiliated with the ACLU. It eventually became affiliated with the Civil Rights Congress, changed its name to become the Hawaii Civil Rights Congress, and was listed as a communist organization by the Attorney General of Hawaii and a Territorial House of Representatives committee.

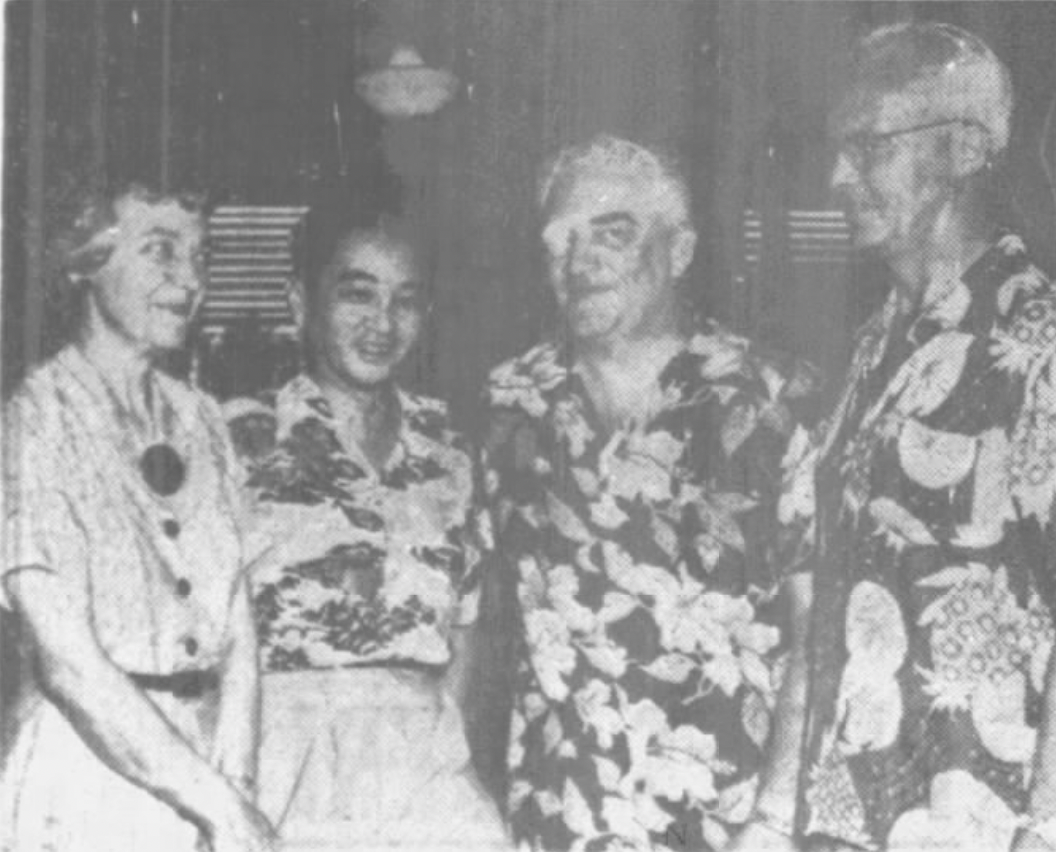
Officers of the unsuccessful Hawaii ACLU affiliate founded in 1953, including Allan Saunders

A second unsuccessful attempt took place in 1953. Hoping to establish an official ACLU affiliate, about 60 people gathered to write bylaws and elect a board of directors. The nascent organization took care to present itself as nonpartisan due to ongoing McCarthyism; news coverage noted that it had no connection with the Hawaii Civil Rights Congress, but stated that the national ACLU had been said to include "left-wingers" among its members. A membership meeting was held in November 1953, at which six speakers including Patsy Mink discussed issues relating to civil liberties. While it did gain affiliate status, this local ACLU organization eventually dissolved.

The successful formation of the ACLU of Hawaiʻi took place in 1965, beginning with a February meeting hosted by Madalyn Murray. The organization was recognized as an ACLU affiliate in September 1965. Its founding president was Margaret Holden, who was also State Librarian at the time. The Honolulu Advertiser reported that the organization would be nonpartisan and focus solely on "the defense of civil liberties in freedom of speech, association and religion; due process, and equal treatment under law".

The ACLU of Hawaiʻi recognizes Allan Saunders, an organizer in both the 1953 and 1965 efforts and a founding officer in both organizations, as its founder.

=== Early activity ===
In January 1966, the ACLU of Hawaiʻi held a public forum focused on due process at the Church of the Crossroads. It investigated the arrests of two University of Hawaiʻi at Mānoa students for alleged flag desecration during an Anti-Vietnam War protest in March, later hiring former Prosecuting Attorney of Honolulu Norman Chung to dispute their court case on the grounds that Hawaii's law against flag desecration was unconstitutional. Along with three other ACLU attorneys, Chung filed an amicus brief in August, describing the statute as "an unjustifiable abridgment of free speech" and stating that it was unconstitutionally vague and "should not be applied to the politically expressive conduct of the defendants".

In September 1967, two male students at Kailua High School faced disciplinary action for refusing to cut their hair; one was suspended while the other was threatened with suspension. The boys arranged to receive legal assistance through the ACLU of Hawaiʻi, which planned to represent them on the basis that regulations imposed by schools should be related to the educational process. While the boys' suspensions were justified by a state law that prohibited "conduct detrimental to the morals and discipline of the school", attorney John M. A. Burgess of the ACLU of Hawaiʻi and the Legal Aid Society of Hawaii expressed an intent to "test the reasonableness of these suspensions" in court. The same month, the ACLU of Hawaiʻi called for the implementation of a civilian police oversight agency for the Honolulu Police Department and supported University of Hawaii professor Oliver Lee after he was not granted tenure in the wake of a controversial statement by the Student Partisan Alliance (SPA) at the university, of which he was faculty adviser. Lee, a leader of the Hawaii Committee to End the War in Vietnam, had been told by the university administration that he would receive tenure. The release of the SPA statement, which called for infiltration of the United States Armed Forces and violent sabotage of military operations with the goal of disrupting the Vietnam War, led the administration to decline tenure for Professor Lee.
