= Suzanne Chun Oakland =

American politician

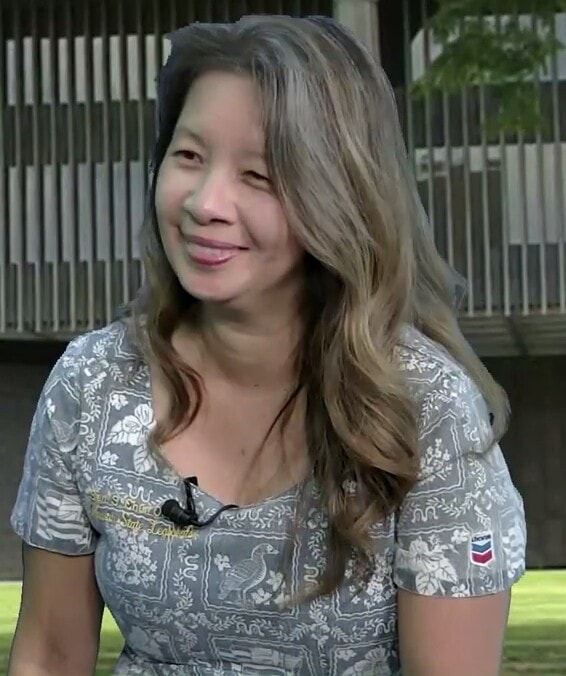

Member of the Hawaii Senate from the 13th district 14th (1996-2002)
- In office November 5, 1996 – November 8, 2016
- Preceded by: Milton Holt
- Succeeded by: Karl Rhoads

Member of the Hawaii House of Representatives from the 27th district 34th (1990-1992)
- In office 1990–1996
- Preceded by: Michael Liu
- Succeeded by: Lei Ahu Isa

Personal details
- Born: June 27, 1961 (age 65) Honolulu, Hawaii, U.S.
- Party: Democratic
- Spouse: Michael Oakland
- Children: 3
- Education: University of Hawaiʻi

Suzanne N.J. 'Susie' Chun Oakland (born June 27, 1961) is an American politician and former Democratic member of the Hawaii Senate who represented the 13th District from 1996 to 2016. Previously she was a member of the Hawaii House of Representatives from 1990 to 1996. She is generally considered to have liberal political views.

== Member of the following Senate committees ==
- Human Services (Chair)
- Education
- Ways and Means
- Heath
- Agriculture

== Education ==
Chun Oakland received her Bachelor of Arts degree in communications and psychology from the University of Hawaiʻi.

== Personal life ==
Suzanne Chun Oakland is the eldest of three siblings born to Philip S. Chun and Mei-Chih Chun. She is the mother of three children and two grandchildren.
