= 2024 Hawaii Amendment 1 =

- November 5, 2024
- Hawaii Remove Legislature Authority to Limit Marriage to Opposite-Sex Couples Amendment

Results
Choice	Votes	%
Yes	268,038	55.94%
No	211,142	44.06%
Valid votes	479,180	91.76%
Invalid or blank votes	43,056	8.24%
Total votes	522,236	100.00%
Registered voters/turnout	860,868	55.66%

Yes
70–80%
60–70%
50–60%
No
90–100%
80–90%
70–80%
50–60%
Other
No votes
- Source: State of Hawaii Office of Elections

A referendum on Amendment 1 to the Constitution of Hawaii was held on 5 November 2024. The amendment repealed the Hawaii legislature's ability to limit marriage to heterosexual couples, reversing the 1998 Hawaii Amendment 2. The majority of the voters backed the measure; it succeeded in all four of Hawaii's major counties. The wording of the ballot language proved confusing to a number of voters, who were unsure of what the amendment accomplished. The amendment passed simultaneously with similar ones in California and Colorado.

== Background ==
In 1993, the Supreme Court of Hawaii ruled that a ban on same-sex marriage violated the state's constitution in Baehr v. Miike. However in 1998, Amendment 2 was approved via a referendum, allowing the Hawaii legislature to ban same-sex marriage. Hawaii ultimately legalized same-sex marriage in 2013, becoming the 15th state to do so and preceding Obergefell v. Hodges by two years. Following the United States Supreme Court's decision in Dobbs v. Jackson Women's Health Organization and hints by Supreme Court Justice Clarence Thomas towards reconsidering Obergefell v. Hodges, activists have raised concerns over the ruling's future. Ballot measures in Hawaii, California and Colorado were intended to safeguard same-sex marriage if the decision was ever overturned.

== Legislative process ==
Votes in the House of Representatives, by district: Voted for Abstained/Not present Against

Votes in the Senate, by district: Voted for Abstained/Not present Against

In 2023, a coalition of local organizations was formed to repeal Amendment 2. Senator Chris Lee and Representative Adrian Tam announced their support for the campaign and pledged to push for the passage of legislation repealing the amendment. A constitutional amendment was introduced to the State Legislature on January 24, 2024 by Representative Scott Saiki. It passed the House on March 5 by 43 votes to 6, and the Senate on April 9 by 24 votes to 1. Senator Mike Gabbard, well-known for his opposition to same-sex marriage in the 1990s, gave a public apology in the Senate Judiciary Committee and voted to repeal the amendment in the final vote on the Senate floor. As Amendment 1, it was approved on November 5, 2024 with 56% of the vote. (Note: Voters were asked: "Shall the state constitution be amended to repeal the legislature's authority to reserve marriage to opposite-sex couples?") Constitutional amendments require a majority of all votes cast; taking the blank votes and overvotes into account, the measure passed by 51–40 percent. It was approved in all counties except Kalawao, and on all islands except Niʻihau and Molokaʻi.

March 5, 2024 vote in the House of Representatives
Political affiliation	Voted for	Voted against	Absent (Did not vote)
Democratic Party	42: Micah Aiu; Terez Amato; Della Au Belatti; Cory Chun; Luke Evslin; Sonny Ganaden; Cedric Gates; Mark Hashem; Daniel Holt; Natalia Hussey-Burdick; Greggor Ilagan; Linda Ichiyama; Kirstin Kahaloa; Jeanné Kapela; Darius Kila; Lisa Kitagawa; Bertrand Kobayashi; Trish La Chica; Rachele Lamosao; Nicole Lowen; Lisa Marten; Rose Martinez; Scot Matayoshi; Tyson Miyake; May Mizuno; Dee Morikawa; Nadine Nakamura; Mark Nakashima; Scott Nishimoto; Richard Onishi; Amy Perruso; Mahina Poepoe; Sean Quinlan; Scott Saiki; Jackson Sayama; Gregg Takayama; Jenna Takenouchi; Andrew Takuya Garrett; Adrian Tam; David Tarnas; Chris Toshiro Todd; Kyle Yamashita	1: Sam Satoru Kong	2: Elle Cochran; Justin Woodson
Republican Party	1: Kanani Souza	5: David Alcos; Diamond Garcia; Lauren Matsumoto; Elijah Pierick; Gene Ward	–
Total	43	6	2
Total	84.3%	11.8%	3.9%

April 9, 2024 vote in the Senate
Political affiliation	Voted for	Voted against	Absent (Did not vote)
Democratic Party	23: Henry Aquino; Stanley Chang; Lynn DeCoite; Donovan Dela Cruz; Brandon Elefante; Carol Fukunaga; Mike Gabbard; Troy Hashimoto; Les Ihara Jr.; Lorraine Inouye; Dru Kanuha; Jarrett Keohokalole; Michelle Kidani; Ron Kouchi; Chris Lee; Angus McKelvey; Donna Mercado Kim; Sharon Moriwaki; Karl Rhoads; Tim Richards III; Joy San Buenaventura; Maile Shimabukuro; Glenn Wakai	–	–
Republican Party	1: Brenton Awa	1: Kurt Fevella	–
Total	24	1	0
Total	96.0%	4.0%	0.0%

== Position ==
=== Parties ===
The Democratic Party of Hawaii backed the amendment, while the Republican Party of Hawaii neither endorsed nor opposed it.

=== Current and former elected officials ===
Josh Green, the Governor of Hawaii, supported the amendment, as did the former Governors David Ige and John D. Waiheʻe III. It was also backed by Senator Brian Schatz and Representative Ed Case, as well as former Hawaiʻi Supreme Court Justice Steven Levinson and numerous other officials.

=== Organizations ===
Organizations such as ACLU of Hawaiʻi, Japanese American Citizens League, Hawai`i LGBT Legacy Foundation, Hawai'i Health & Harm Reduction Center, Council For Native Hawaiian Advancement, Hawaii Civil Rights Commission, Change 23 Coalition, Papa Ola Lōkahi, Hawaii State Teachers Association, Hawai'i State AFL-CIO, Hawaii Workers Center, Hawaii Rainbow Chamber of Commerce, Rainbow Family 808, Highgate Hawaii, Equality HI, Common Cause Hawaii, O'ahu Jewish 'Ohana and Interfaith Alliance of Hawai'i supported the amendment.

== Results ==
As of November 13, 2024, the State of Hawaii released a final summary of votes.

=== By county ===
"Yes" performed moderately well across the state, winning four of five counties and performing the best in Hawai'i County.

County	Yes #	Yes %	No #	No %
Hawai'i	43,973	57.31%	32,749	42.69%
Honolulu	177,669	55.64%	141,655	44.36%
Kalawao	7	46.67%	8	53.33%
Kauaʻi	14,167	54.06%	12,039	45.94%
Maui	32,229	56.61%	24,699	43.39%

=== By congressional district ===
"Yes" won both congressional districts.

District	Yes, %	No, %	Representative
1st	57%	43%	Ed Case
2nd	55%	45%	Jill Tokuda

== See also ==
- 1998 Hawaii Amendment 2
- Same-sex marriage in Hawaii
- 2024 California Proposition 3
- 2024 Colorado Amendment J
- 2024 United States ballot measures
