= 2014 Hawaii Senate election =

- November 4, 2014

13 of the 25 seats in the Hawaii Senate 13 seats needed for a majority
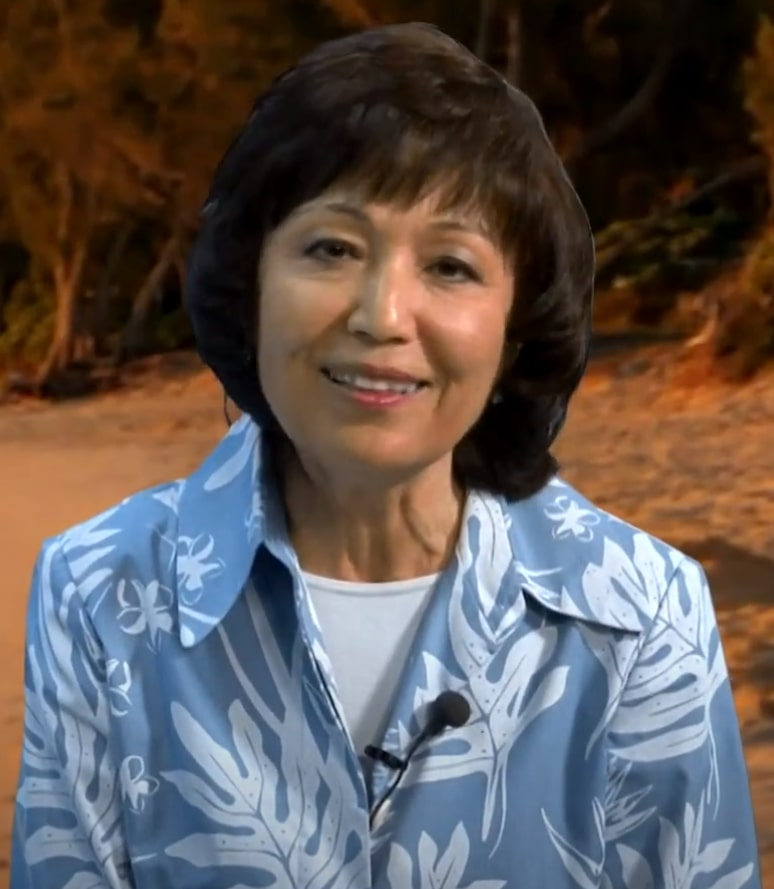

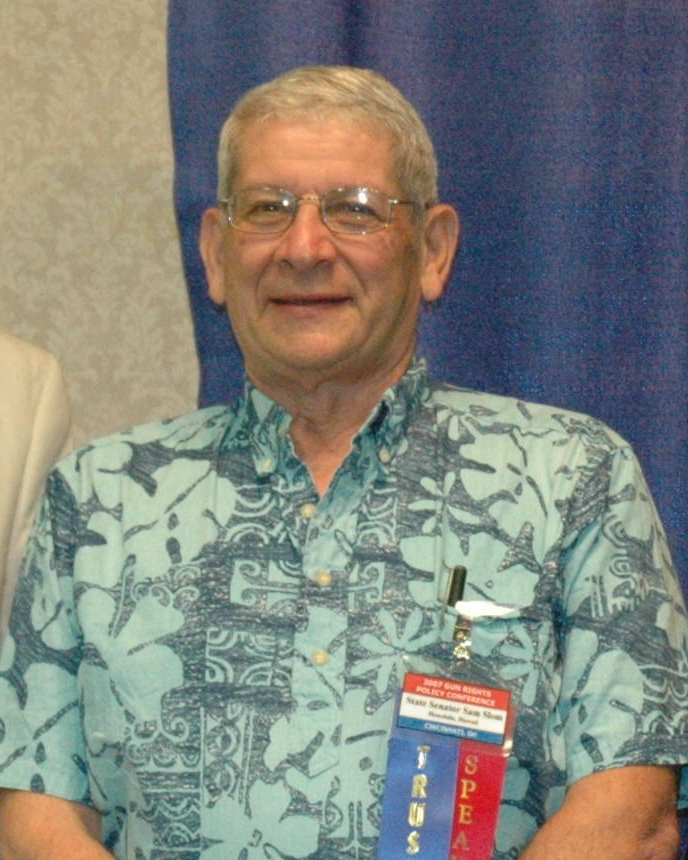
	Majority party	Minority party
Leader	Donna Mercado Kim	Sam Slom
Party	Democratic	Republican
Leader's seat	14th District	9th District
Seats before	24	1
Seats after	24	1
Seat change	Steady	Steady
- Results: Democratic hold No election
President of the Senate before election
Donna Mercado Kim
Democratic
Elected President of the Senate
Donna Mercado Kim
Democratic

The 2014 Hawaii Senate elections took place as part of the biennial United States elections. Hawaii voters elected state senators in 14 of the state senate's 25 districts. State senators serve four-year terms in the Hawaii Senate.

The primary election took place on August 9, 2014. The general election also took place on November 4, 2014.

== Predictions ==
Source	Ranking	As of
Governing	Safe D	October 20, 2014

== Election results ==
Source for primary results. Source for general election results.

=== District 1 ===
2014 Hawaii's 1st Senate District Democratic Primary election
Party	Candidate	Votes	%
Democratic	Gil Kahele (incumbent)	8,366	73.2%
Democratic	Wendell KA'EHU'AE'A	1,817	15.9%
N/A	Blank Votes	1,229	10.8%
N/A	Over Votes	12	0.1%
Total votes		11,424	100.0%

2014 Hawaii's 1st Senate District Libertarian Primary election
Party	Candidate	Votes	%
Libertarian	Gregory (Kobata) Arianoff	29	74.4%
N/A	Blank Votes	10	25.6%
N/A	Over Votes	0	0.0%
Total votes		39	100.0%

2014 Hawaii's 1st Senate District General Election
Party	Candidate	Votes	%
Democratic	Gil Kahele (incumbent)	11,638	78.9%
Libertarian	Gregory (Kobata) Arianoff	1,850	12.6%
N/A	Blank Votes	1,247	8.5%
N/A	Over Votes	6	0.0%
Total votes		14,741	100.0%
Democratic hold			

=== District 3 ===
2014 Hawaii's 3rd Senate District Democratic Primary election
Party	Candidate	Votes	%
Democratic	Josh Green (incumbent)	5,722	83.2%
N/A	Blank Votes	1,149	16.7%
N/A	Over Votes	5	0.1%
Total votes		6,876	100.0%

2014 Hawaii's 3rd Senate District Libertarian Primary election
Party	Candidate	Votes	%
Libertarian	Michael L. Last	42	95.5%
N/A	Blank Votes	2	4.5%
N/A	Over Votes	0	0.0%
Total votes		44	100.0%

2014 Hawaii's 3rd Senate District General Election
Party	Candidate	Votes	%
Democratic	Josh Green (incumbent)	8,896	76.1%
Libertarian	Michael L. Last	1,891	16.2%
N/A	Blank Votes	908	7.8%
N/A	Over Votes	1	0.0%
Total votes		11,696	100.0%
Democratic hold			

=== District 4 ===
2014 Hawaii's 4th Senate District Democratic Primary election
Party	Candidate	Votes	%
Democratic	Lorraine Inouye	4,373	55.2%
Democratic	Malama Solomon (incumbent)	3,161	39.9%
N/A	Blank Votes	378	4.8%
N/A	Over Votes	6	0.1%
Total votes		7,918	100.0%

2014 Hawaii's 4th Senate District Libertarian Primary election
Party	Candidate	Votes	%
Libertarian	Alain Schiller	36	78.3%
N/A	Blank Votes	9	19.6%
N/A	Over Votes	1	2.2%
Total votes		46	100.0%

2014 Hawaii's 4th Senate District General Election
Party	Candidate	Votes	%
Democratic	Lorraine Inouye	8,882	72.3%
Libertarian	Alain Schiller	2,536	20.7%
N/A	Blank Votes	852	6.9%
N/A	Over Votes	7	0.1%
Total votes		12,277	100.0%
Democratic hold			

=== District 5 ===
2014 Hawaii's 5th Senate District Democratic Primary election
Party	Candidate	Votes	%
Democratic	Gilbert Keith-Agaran (incumbent)	5,246	57.8%
Democratic	Christy Kajiwara	2,947	32.5%
N/A	Blank Votes	882	9.7%
N/A	Over Votes	5	0.1%
Total votes		9,080	100.0%

2014 Hawaii's 5th Senate District Republican Primary election
Party	Candidate	Votes	%
Republican	Joe Kamaka	758	72.4%
N/A	Blank Votes	289	27.6%
N/A	Over Votes	0	0.0%
Total votes		1,047	100.0%

2014 Hawaii's 5th Senate District General Election
Party	Candidate	Votes	%
Democratic	Gilbert Keith-Agaran (incumbent)	9,770	64.7%
Republican	Joe Kamaka	4,149	27.5%
N/A	Blank Votes	1,172	7.8%
N/A	Over Votes	10	0.1%
Total votes		15,101	100.0%
Democratic hold			

=== District 6 ===
2014 Hawaii's 6th Senate District Democratic Primary election
Party	Candidate	Votes	%
Democratic	Rosalyn Baker (incumbent)	2,699	52.6%
Democratic	Terez M. Amato	2,213	43.1%
N/A	Blank Votes	216	4.2%
N/A	Over Votes	5	0.1%
Total votes		5,133	100.0%

2014 Hawaii's 6th Senate District Republican Primary election
Party	Candidate	Votes	%
Republican	Jared P. (Pika) Dubois	814	71.2%
N/A	Blank Votes	329	28.8%
N/A	Over Votes	0	0.0%
Total votes		1,143	100.0%

2014 Hawaii's 6th Senate District Libertarian Primary election
Party	Candidate	Votes	%
Libertarian	Bronson Kekahuna Kaahui	36	87.8%
N/A	Blank Votes	5	12.8%
N/A	Over Votes	0	0.0%
Total votes		41	100.0%

2014 Hawaii's 6th Senate District General election
Party	Candidate	Votes	%
Democratic	Rosalyn Baker (incumbent)	7,210	56.8%
Republican	Jared P. (Pika) Dubois	2,916	23.0%
Libertarian	Bronson Kekahuna Kaahui	1,196	9.4%
N/A	Blank Votes	1,349	10.6%
N/A	Over Votes	13	0.1%
Total votes		12,684	100.0%
Democratic hold			

=== District 7 ===
2014 Hawaii's 7th Senate District Democratic Primary election
Party	Candidate	Votes	%
Democratic	J. Kalani English (incumbent)	6,878	74.1%
N/A	Blank Votes	2,406	25.9%
N/A	Over Votes	1	0.0%
Total votes		9,285	100.0%

General election
Incumbent Democrat J. Kalani English was automatically reelected without opposition, with no votes recorded.

=== District 12 ===
2014 Hawaii's 12th Senate District Democratic Primary election
Party	Candidate	Votes	%
Democratic	Brickwood Galuteria (incumbent)	4,722	60.4%
Democratic	Carlton N. Middleton	1,632	20.9%
N/A	Blank Votes	1,466	18.7%
N/A	Over Votes	2	0.0%
Total votes		7,822	100.0%

2014 Hawaii's 12th Senate District Republican Primary election
Party	Candidate	Votes	%
Republican	Chris Lethem	1,093	69.0%
N/A	Blank Votes	491	31.0%
N/A	Over Votes	0	0.0%
Total votes		1,584	100.0%

2014 Hawaii's 12th Senate District General Election
Party	Candidate	Votes	%
Democratic	Brickwood Galuteria (incumbent)	6,428	53.4%
Republican	Chris Lethem	4,545	37.8%
N/A	Blank Votes	1,046	8.7%
N/A	Over Votes	10	0.1%
Total votes		12,029	100.0%
Democratic hold			

=== District 16 ===
2014 Hawaii's 16th Senate District Democratic Primary election
Party	Candidate	Votes	%
Democratic	Breene Harimoto	8,646	67.1%
N/A	Blank Votes	4,238	32.9%
N/A	Over Votes	5	0.0%
Total votes		12,889	100.0%

General election
Democrat Breene Harimoto was automatically reelected without opposition, with no votes recorded.

=== District 17 ===
2014 Hawaii's 17th Senate District Democratic Primary election
Party	Candidate	Votes	%
Democratic	Clarence Nishihara (incumbent)	6,519	74.0%
N/A	Blank Votes	2,290	26.0%
N/A	Over Votes	1	0.0%
Total votes		8,810	100.0%

2014 Hawaii's 17th Senate District Independent Primary election
Party	Candidate	Votes	%
Independent	Roger Clemente	39	47.6%
N/A	Blank Votes	43	52.4%
N/A	Over Votes	0	0.0%
Total votes		82	100.0%

2014 Hawaii's 17th Senate District General Election
Party	Candidate	Votes	%
Democratic	Clarence Nishihara (incumbent)	8,316	64.9%
Independent	Roger Clemente	3,531	27.5%
N/A	Blank Votes	973	7.6%
N/A	Over Votes	2	0.0%
Total votes		12,822	100.0%
Democratic hold			

=== District 18 ===
2014 Hawaii's 18th Senate District Democratic Primary election
Party	Candidate	Votes	%
Democratic	Michelle Kidani (incumbent)	9,185	76.2%
N/A	Blank Votes	2,860	23.7%
N/A	Over Votes	2	0.0%
Total votes		12,047	100.0%

2014 Hawaii's 18th Senate District Republican Primary election
Party	Candidate	Votes	%
Republican	Dennis C. H. Kim	2,026	77.2%
N/A	Blank Votes	600	22.8%
N/A	Over Votes	0	0.0%
Total votes		2,626	100.0%

2014 Hawaii's 18th Senate District Libertarian Primary election
Party	Candidate	Votes	%
Libertarian	Raymond Banda III	23	100.0%
N/A	Blank Votes	0	0.0%
N/A	Over Votes	0	0.0%
Total votes		23	100.0%

2014 Hawaii's 18th Senate District General election
Party	Candidate	Votes	%
Democratic	Michelle Kidani (incumbent)	10,257	54.6%
Republican	Dennis C. H. Kim	7,348	39.1%
Libertarian	Raymond Banda III	389	4.1%
N/A	Blank Votes	769	4.1%
N/A	Over Votes	9	0.0%
Total votes		18,772	100.0%
Democratic hold			

=== District 21 ===
2014 Hawaii's 21st Senate District Democratic Primary election
Party	Candidate	Votes	%
Democratic	Maile Shimabukuro (incumbent)	3,608	72.1%
Democratic	Michael P. Kahikina	1,202	24.0%
N/A	Blank Votes	191	3.8%
N/A	Over Votes	1	0.0%
Total votes		5,002	100.0%

2014 Hawaii's 21st Senate District Republican Primary election
Party	Candidate	Votes	%
Republican	Tercia L. Ku	466	29.4%
Republican	Johnnie-Mae L. Perry	451	28.4%
Republican	Randy Roman Jr.	436	27.5%
N/A	Blank Votes	232	14.6%
N/A	Over Votes	2	0.1%
Total votes		1,587	100.0%

2014 Hawaii's 21st Senate District Nonpartisan Primary election
Party	Candidate	Votes	%
Nonpartisan	Ruth A. Brown	19	65.5%
N/A	Blank Votes	10	34.5%
N/A	Over Votes	0	0.0%
Total votes		29	100.0%

2014 Hawaii's 21st Senate District General Election
Party	Candidate	Votes	%
Democratic	Maile Shimabukuro (incumbent)	6,079	64.8%
Republican	Tercia L. Ku	2,870	30.6%
N/A	Blank Votes	433	4.6%
N/A	Over Votes	10	0.1%
Total votes		9,392	100.0%
Democratic hold			

Nonpartisan candidate Ruth A. Brown was not on the ballot for the general election.

=== District 23 ===
2014 Hawaii's 23rd Senate District Democratic Primary election
Party	Candidate	Votes	%
Democratic	Gil Riviere	3,911	70.5%
N/A	Blank Votes	1,631	29.4%
N/A	Over Votes	3	0.1%
Total votes		5,545	100.0%

2014 Hawaii's 23rd Senate District Republican Primary election
Party	Candidate	Votes	%
Republican	Richard Lee Fale	1,286	57.2%
Republican	Colleen Meyer	777	34.5%
Republican	Norman Kaiipohaku J. Brown	119	5.3%
N/A	Blank Votes	65	2.9%
N/A	Over Votes	2	0.1%
Total votes		2,249	100.0%

2014 Hawaii's 23rd Senate District General Election
Party	Candidate	Votes	%
Democratic	Gil Riviere	5,320	50.4%
Republican	Richard Lee Fale	4,857	46.0%
N/A	Blank Votes	377	3.6%
N/A	Over Votes	10	0.1%
Total votes		10,564	100.0%
Democratic hold			

=== District 24 ===
2014 Hawaii's 24th Senate District Democratic Primary election
Party	Candidate	Votes	%
Democratic	Jill Tokuda (incumbent)	10,870	79.8%
N/A	Blank Votes	2,746	20.2%
N/A	Over Votes	5	0.0%
Total votes		13,621	100.0%

2014 Hawaii's 24th Senate District Republican Primary election
Party	Candidate	Votes	%
Republican	Kilomana Michael Danner	1,645	61.7%
N/A	Blank Votes	1,023	38.3%
N/A	Over Votes	0	0.0%
Total votes		2,668	100.0%

2014 Hawaii's Senate District General Election
Party	Candidate	Votes	%
Democratic	Jill Tokuda (incumbent)	13,817	70.8%
Republican	Kilomana Michael Danner	4,626	23.7%
N/A	Blank Votes	1,073	5.5%
N/A	Over Votes	4	0.0%
Total votes		19,520	100.0%
Democratic hold			
