= 2018 Hawaii Senate election =

- November 6, 2018

13 of the 25 seats in the Hawaii Senate 13 seats needed for a majority
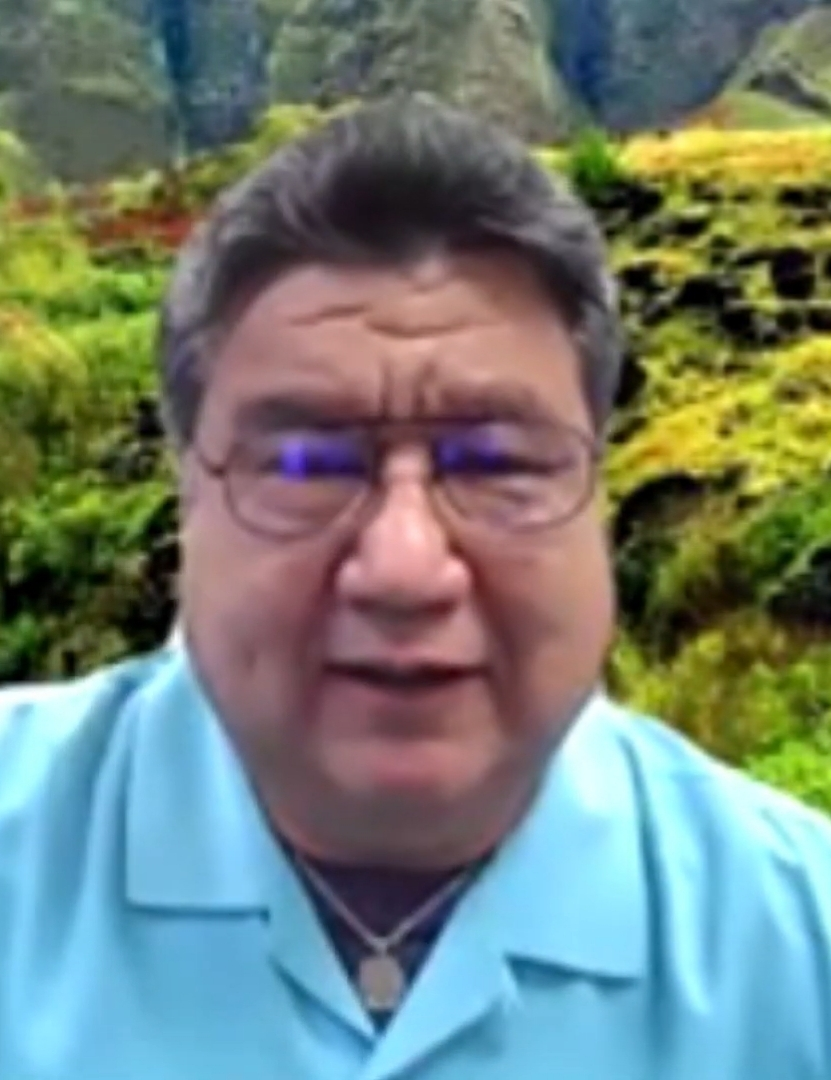

	Majority party	Minority party
Leader	Ron Kouchi	(n/a)
Party	Democratic	Republican
Leader's seat	8th	(n/a)
Last election	25	0
Seats before	25	0
Seats won	24	1
Seat change	▼1	▲1
- Results of the elections: Republican gain Democratic hold No election
President of the Senate before election
Ron Kouchi
Democratic
Elected President of the Senate
Ron Kouchi
Democratic

The 2018 Hawaii Senate elections took place as part of the biennial United States elections. Hawaii voters elected state senators in 13 of the state senate's 25 districts. State senators serve four-year terms in the Hawaii Senate.

A primary election on August 11, 2018, determined which candidates would appear on the November 6 general election ballot. Primary election results can be obtained from the State of Hawaii's Office of Elections website. A statewide map of Hawaii's state Senate districts can be obtained from the state's Office of Planning here, and individual district maps can be obtained from the state's Office of Elections here.

Following the 2016 state senate elections, Democrats gained complete control of the Senate, with all 25 members.

To claim control of the chamber from Democrats, the Republicans needed to gain 13 senate seats; the Republicans only managed to gain one seat, but returned to having a presence in the chamber after being shut out in the 2016 elections.

== Summary of results by Senate district ==
- Districts not shown did not have an election until 2020.

State Senate district	Incumbent	Party	Elected Senator	Party
1st	Kaiali‘i Kahele	Dem	Kaiali‘i Kahele	Dem
3rd	Josh Green	Dem	Dru Kanuha	Dem
4th	Lorraine Inouye	Dem	Lorraine Inouye	Dem
6th	Roz Baker	Dem	Roz Baker	Dem
7th	J. Kalani English	Dem	J. Kalani English	Dem
12th	Brickwood Galuteria	Dem	Sharon Moriwaki	Dem
16th	Breene Harimoto	Dem	Breene Harimoto	Dem
17th	Clarence K. Nishihara	Dem	Clarence K. Nishihara	Dem
18th	Michelle Kidani	Dem	Michelle Kidani	Dem
19th	Jon Yoshimura	Dem	Kurt Fevella	Rep
21st	Maile Shimabukuro	Dem	Maile Shimabukuro	Dem
23rd	Gil Riviere	Dem	Gil Riviere	Dem
24th	Jill N. Tokuda	Dem	Jarrett Keohokalole	Dem

== Predictions ==
Source	Ranking	As of
Governing	Safe D	October 8, 2018

== Detailed results by State Senate district ==
=== District 1 ===
Hawaii's 1st Senate District general election, 2018
Party	Candidate	Votes	%
Democratic	Kaiali‘i Kahele (incumbent)	12,492	87.5
Libertarian	Kimberly Arianoff	1,792	12.5
Total votes		14,284	100.0
Democratic hold			

=== District 3 ===
Hawaii's 3rd State Senate District Democratic primary election, 2018
Party	Candidate	Votes	%
Democratic	Dru Kanuha	4,322	54.6
Democratic	Brenda Ford	3,600	45.4
Total votes		7,922	100.0

Hawaii's 3rd Senate District general election, 2018
Party	Candidate	Votes	%
Democratic	Dru Kanuha	10,650	79.3
Libertarian	Michael Last	2,773	20.7
Total votes		13,423	100.0
Democratic hold			

=== District 4 ===
Hawaii's 4th State Senate District Democratic primary election, 2018
Party	Candidate	Votes	%
Democratic	Lorraine Inouye (incumbent)	4,982	54.9
Democratic	Heather Kimball	4,092	45.1
Total votes		9,074	100.0

- The state of Hawaii does not report vote totals for uncontested races. Incumbent Democrat Lorraine Inouye was re-elected without opposition in the general election.

Hawaii's 4th Senate District general election, 2018
Party	Candidate	Votes	%
Democratic	Lorraine Inouye (incumbent)	Unreported	100.0
Total votes		Unreported	100.0
Democratic hold			

=== District 6 ===
Hawaii's 6th State Senate District Democratic primary election, 2018
Party	Candidate	Votes	%
Democratic	Roz Baker (incumbent)	3,394	50.8
Democratic	Terez Amato	3,288	49.2
Total votes		6,682	100.0

Hawaii's 6th Senate District general election, 2018
Party	Candidate	Votes	%
Democratic	Roz Baker (incumbent)	8,978	67.2
Green	Melissah Shishido	4,379	32.8
Total votes		13,357	100.0
Democratic hold			

=== District 7 ===
Hawaii's 7th State Senate District Democratic primary election, 2018
Party	Candidate	Votes	%
Democratic	J. Kalani English (incumbent)	7,331	68.2
Democratic	Michael Tengan	2,547	23.7
Democratic	Gayla Haliniak	872	8.1
Total votes		10,750	100.0

- The state of Hawaii does not report vote totals for uncontested races. Incumbent Democrat J. Kalani English was re-elected without opposition in the general election.

Hawaii's 7th Senate District general election, 2018
Party	Candidate	Votes	%
Democratic	J. Kalani English (incumbent)	Unreported	100.0
Total votes		Unreported	100.0
Democratic hold			

=== District 12 ===
Hawaii's 12th State Senate District Democratic primary election, 2018
Party	Candidate	Votes	%
Democratic	Sharon Moriwaki	4,687	61.4
Democratic	Brickwood Galuteria (incumbent)	2,942	38.6
Total votes		7,629	100.0

Hawaii's 12th Senate District general election, 2018
Party	Candidate	Votes	%
Democratic	Sharon Y. Moriwaki	9,507	70.4
Republican	Lynn Barry Mariano	3,999	29.6
Total votes		13,506	100.0
Democratic hold			

=== District 16 ===
- The state of Hawaii does not report vote totals for uncontested races. Incumbent Democrat Breene Harimoto was re-elected without opposition in the general election.

Hawaii's 16th Senate District general election, 2018
Party	Candidate	Votes	%
Democratic	Breene Harimoto (incumbent)	Unreported	100.0
Total votes		Unreported	100.0
Democratic hold			

=== District 17 ===
Hawaii's 17th Senate District general election, 2018
Party	Candidate	Votes	%
Democratic	Clarence K. Nishihara (incumbent)	7,828	68.9
Republican	Roger Clemente	3,538	31.1
Total votes		11,366	100.0
Democratic hold			

=== District 18 ===
Hawaii's 18th State Senate District Republican primary election, 2018
Party	Candidate	Votes	%
Republican	Tony Solis	1,086	68.0
Republican	Emil Svrcina	510	32.0
Total votes		1,596	100.0

Hawaii's 18th Senate District general election, 2018
Party	Candidate	Votes	%
Democratic	Michelle Kidani (incumbent)	11,845	67.0
Republican	Tony Solis	5,830	33.0
Total votes		17,675	100.0
Democratic hold			

=== District 19 ===
Hawaii's 19th State Senate District Democratic primary election, 2018
Party	Candidate	Votes	%
Democratic	Matt LoPresti	3,280	61.4
Democratic	Alicia Maluafiti	1,453	27.2
Democratic	Veronica Duzon	613	11.4
Total votes		5,346	100.0

Hawaii's 19th Senate District general election, 2018
Party	Candidate	Votes	%
Republican	Kurt Fevella	6,205	50.5
Democratic	Matt LoPresti	6,089	49.5
Total votes		12,294	100.0
Republican gain from Democratic			

=== District 21 ===
Hawaii's 21st State Senate District Democratic primary election, 2018
Party	Candidate	Votes	%
Democratic	Maile Shimabukuro (incumbent)	3,945	86.8
Democratic	Tim Riley	601	13.2
Total votes		4,546	100.0

Hawaii's 21st Senate District general election, 2018
Party	Candidate	Votes	%
Democratic	Maile Shimabukuro (incumbent)	5,808	58.9
Republican	Diamond Garcia	4,049	41.1
Total votes		9,857	100.0
Democratic hold			

=== District 23 ===
Hawaii's 23rd State Senate District Democratic primary election, 2018
Party	Candidate	Votes	%
Democratic	Gil Riviere (incumbent)	3,640	66.8
Democratic	Clayton Hee	1,806	33.2
Total votes		5,446	100.0

- The state of Hawaii does not report vote totals for uncontested races. Incumbent Democrat Gil Riviere was re-elected without opposition in the general election.

Hawaii's 23rd Senate District general election, 2018
Party	Candidate	Votes	%
Democratic	Gil Riviere (incumbent)	Unreported	100.0
Total votes		Unreported	100.0
Democratic hold			

=== District 24 ===
Hawaii's 24th State Senate District Democratic primary election, 2018
Party	Candidate	Votes	%
Democratic	Jarrett Keohokalole	7,840	59.2
Democratic	Ken Ito	5,397	40.8
Total votes		13,237	100.0

- The state of Hawaii does not report vote totals for uncontested races. Democrat Jarrett Keohokalole was elected without opposition in the general election.

Hawaii's 24th Senate District general election, 2018
Party	Candidate	Votes	%
Democratic	Jarrett Keohokalole	Unreported	100.0
Total votes		Unreported	100.0
Democratic hold			

== See also ==
- 2018 United States elections
- 2018 United States Senate election in Hawaii
- 2018 United States House of Representatives elections in Hawaii
- 2018 Hawaii gubernatorial election
- 2018 Hawaii House of Representatives election
