= Senator Kahele =

Senator Kahele may refer to:

- Gil Kahele (1942–2016), Hawaii State Senate
- Kai Kahele (born 1974), Hawaii State Senate
