= Kealiʻi =

Kealiʻi is a Hawaiian given name. Notable people include:

- Kealiʻi Ah Yat, American football player
- Kealiʻi Blaisdell (born 1972), American musician
- Kealiʻi Lopez, Hawaiian activist and former chair of the Democratic Party of Hawaii
- Kealiʻi Reichel (born 1962), Hawaiian musician
- Mark Kealiʻi Hoʻomalu (born 1959), Hawaiian chanter
