= Gary Hooser =

American politician

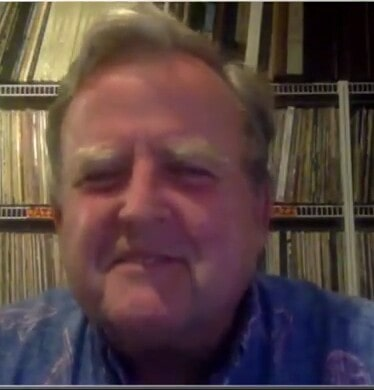

Chair of the Hawaii Democratic Party Acting
- In office August 6, 2019 – August 10, 2019
- Preceded by: Keali'i Lopez
- Succeeded by: Kate Stanley (Acting)

Member of the Hawaii Senate from the 7th district
- In office November 2002 – July 16, 2010
- Preceded by: Jonathan J. Chun
- Succeeded by: Ron Kouchi

Personal details
- Born: January 19, 1954 (age 72) San Diego, California, U.S.
- Party: Democratic
- Spouse: Claudette
- Children: 2
- Education: Kauaʻi Community College; University of Hawaiʻi at West Oʻahu (BA)
- Website: Official website

Gary L. Hooser (born January 19, 1954) is an American politician who served as a member of the Hawaii State Senate representing Kauaʻi and Niʻihau from 2002 to 2010. He also served on the Kauaʻi County Council for four years before becoming a Senator.

In the summer of 2010, Hooser resigned his Senate seat to run for the office of Lieutenant Governor of Hawaiʻi. He was defeated on September 18, 2010 in the Democratic primary by Brian Schatz. The following year, he was appointed to lead the Hawaiʻi Office of Environmental Quality Control. He left that office in 2014 to make a successful run for a seat on the Kaua'i County Council in 2014, but he lost his seat in the 2016 election to Mason Chock. As of 2020, Hooser serves as president of the Hawaiʻi Alliance for Progressive Action advocacy group.

== Background ==
Hooser and his wife Claudette have two children. He graduated from Radford High School. He went on to graduate from Kauaʻi Community College and the University of Hawaiʻi at West Oʻahu with a bachelor's degree in public administration.

== Political career ==
Hooser was first elected to the Kauaʻi County Council in 1998, a position he held until 2002.

Hooser was elected to the Hawaii State Senate in 2002, representing the 7th Senatorial District, which includes the islands of Kauaʻi and Niʻihau. He served as the Senate's majority leader from 2006 until 2010. Hooser was a member of the Senate Ways and Means and Energy and Environment committees and also previously co-chaired the Senate Affordable Housing Task Force. Hooser, as the incumbent in 2004, defeated former Kauaʻi Mayor Maryanne Kusaka to retain his seat.

While in the Senate, Hooser introduced a bill establishing the nation's first solar hot water heating system requirement for new homes. The bill ultimately passed into law in 2010. In 2009, when the Hawaii State Department of Education partially furloughed teachers due to budget constraints brought by the Great Recession, Hooser spoke out against the furloughs and advocated using money from the Hawaii hurricane relief fund to prevent the loss of instructional time. Hooser supported a measure to allow civil unions for same-sex and opposite-sex couples.

Hooser resigned from his Senate seat in July 2010 in order to run for the office of Lieutenant Governor of Hawaiʻi. Hooser received endorsements in the race from a variety of organizations, including the Sierra Club of Hawaii, Hawaiʻi State Teachers Association, Unite Here! Local 5, and the Democratic Party of Hawaiʻi GLBT Caucus. Hooser lost the race to Brian Schatz, coming in fourth place in the Democratic primary.

In February 2011, Governor Neil Abercrombie appointed Hooser as director of the Hawaii Office of Environmental Quality Control, an agency within the Hawaii State Department of Health that implements Hawaii's environmental impact statement law. He left that office to run successfully on the Kaua'i County Council in 2014, but he lost his seat in the 2016 election to Mason Chock.

As of 2020, Hooser serves as president of the Hawaiʻi Alliance for Progressive Action advocacy group.

Party political offices
Preceded by Keali'i Lopez	Chair of the Hawaii Democratic Party; Acting; 2019	Succeeded by Kate Stanley; Acting
