= Lei Ahu Isa =

American politician

Member of the Office of Hawaiian Affairs Board of Trustees
- In office December 2014 – December 2022
- Succeeded by: Brickwood Galuteria
- Constituency: At-Large Trustee

Member of the Hawaii House of Representatives from the 27th district
- In office November 1996 – November 2002
- Preceded by: Suzanne Chun Oakland
- Succeeded by: Redistricted

Personal details
- Born: April 2, 1944 (age 82) Honolulu, Hawaii
- Party: Democratic
- Education: University of Hawaii at Manoa

Leinaʻala (Lei) Ahu Isa (born April 2, 1944) is a Native Hawaiian politician, educator, and real estate broker. She served as an At-Large Trustee for the Office of Hawaiian Affairs (OHA) from 2014 to 2022 and was a member of the Hawaiʻi House of Representatives from 1996 to 2002, representing District 27 (Liliha, Nuʻuanu, Puʻunui). She also served on the Hawaii Board of Education from 2004 to 2012 when it was an elected board.

== Early life and education ==
Lei Ahu Isa was born and raised in Honolulu, Hawaiʻi. She attended Graceland University, University of Virginia Darden School of Business, and the University of Hawaiʻi at Mānoa.

== Office of Hawaiian Affairs ==
In 2014, Ahu Isa was elected as an At-Large Trustee for the Office of Hawaiian Affairs. She cited her mentor and friend, Senator T. C. Yim, as inspiration to run. She served as the vice-chair of the OHA Board of Trustees from 2018 to 2020. Her platform focused on the management of the Public Land Trust (ceded lands) and ensuring the transparency of OHA's multi-million dollar investment portfolio. In the 2022 general election, she was unseated by Brickwood Galuteria. She ran again in 2024 at the urging of trustee Mililani Trask, but lost to Keli'i Akina.
