= Russell S. Kokubun =

American politician (born 1948)

Russell Kokubun

Member of the Hawaii Senate from the 2nd district 3rd (2000–2002)
- In office December 8, 2000 – January 11, 2011
- Appointed by: Ben Cayetano
- Preceded by: Andrew Levin
- Succeeded by: Gil Kahele

Personal details
- Born: May 15, 1948 (age 78) Honolulu, Hawaii
- Party: Democratic
- Spouse: Anne
- Education: Southern Methodist University
- Profession: farmer, project manager

Russell S. Kokubun (born 1948) is a Democratic politician who became a member and Vice President of the Hawaii Senate.

== Life ==
Kokubun was born May 15, 1948, in Honolulu. He graduated from Punahou School in 1966, and Southern Methodist University in 1971. During the 1970s he worked on various agricultural ventures on the island of Hawaiʻi (Big Island). From 1984 through 1988 he served on the council of Hawaii County and was its chair. In 1992 he ran for Mayor of Hawaii County, but lost to fellow Democrat Stephen K. Yamashiro. From 1995 to 1997 he was Yamashiro's executive assistant, and then deputy planning director of the county.

== Senate career ==
Kokubun was initially appointed to represent Hawaii's 3rd Senatorial District in 2000, and was subsequently elected to represent the 2nd Senatorial District in 2002 and again in 2004, 2006, and 2008. The second district includes portions of South Hilo District (portion of Waiakea Uka); Puna District (Keeau, Kurtistown, Mountain View, Glenwood, Pahoa, Hawaiian Acres, Orchid Land Estates, Hawaiian Paradise Park, Pohoiki, Opihikao, Kehena, Kaimū, Kalapana, Volcano); and Kaʻū District (Pāhala, Punaluʻu, Ninole, Honuapo, Naalehu, Kahuku) on the island of Hawaiʻi.

In 2007 he was a member of the Joint Senate–House Investigative Committee on the Bureau of Conveyances. As of the 2009 Legislative Session, Kokubun was a member of the Senate committees on Energy and Environment; Higher Education; Water, Land, Agriculture, and Hawaiian Affairs; and Ways and Means.
