= Misalucha =

Misalucha is a Filipino surname. Notable people with the surname include:

- Bennette Misalucha, American politician
- Lani Misalucha (born 1969), Filipino singer and television personality
