= Brandon Elefante =

American Politician

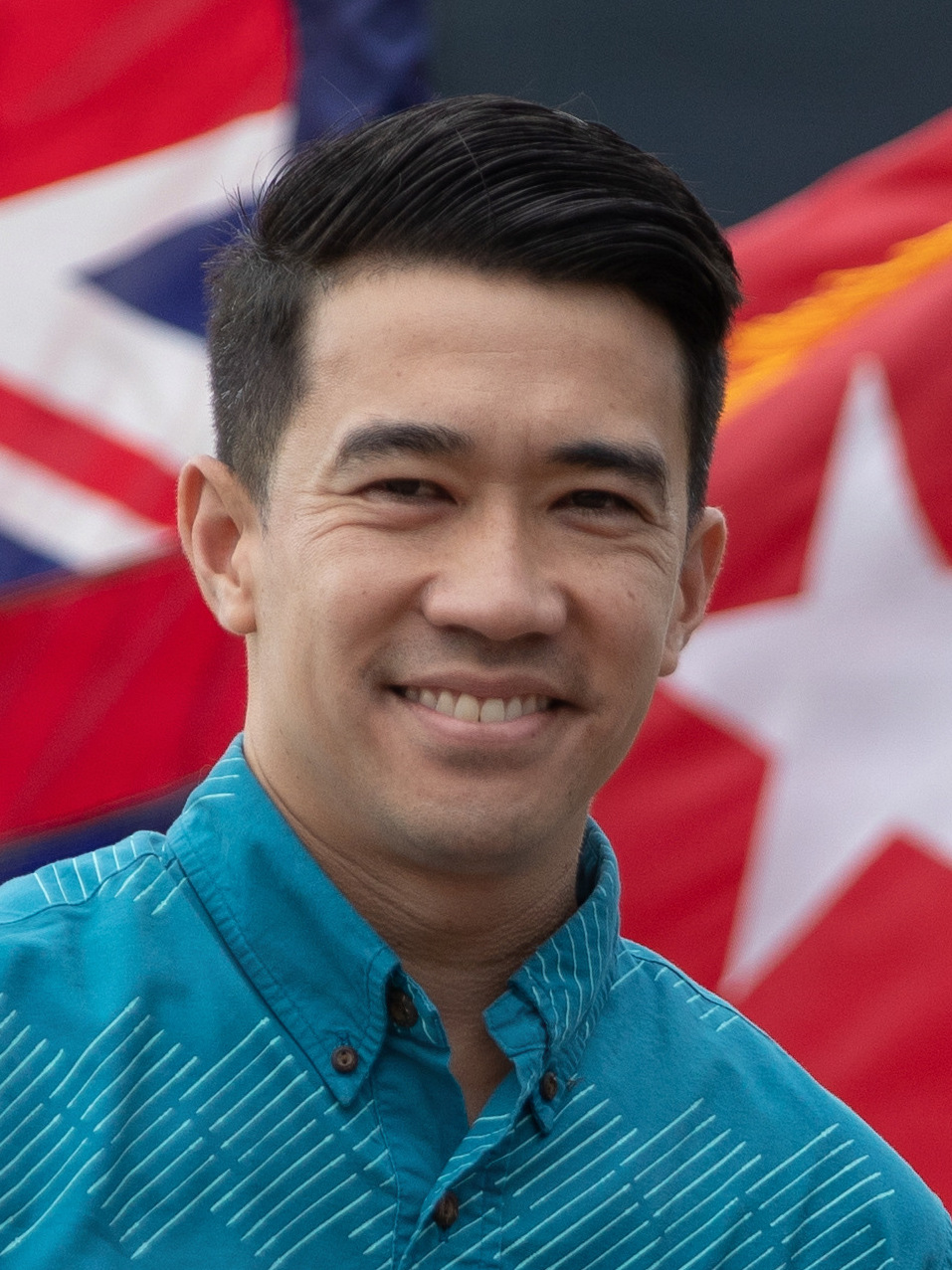
- Elefante in 2025

Member of the Hawaii Senate from the 16th district
- Incumbent
- Assumed office November 8, 2022
- Preceded by: Bennette Misalucha

Member of the Honolulu City Council from the 8th district
- In office 2014–2022
- Preceded by: Breene Harimoto
- Succeeded by: Val Okimoto

Personal details
- Born: 1985 or 1986 (age 39–40) Aiea, Hawaii, U.S.
- Party: Democratic
- Education: Saint Mary's College of California (BS); Chaminade University of Honolulu (MBA)

Brandon J. C. Elefante is an American politician serving as a member of the Hawaii Senate for the 16th district. He was elected to office on November 8, 2022.

== Early life and education ==
Elefante was born and raised in Aiea, Hawaii. He earned a Bachelor of Science degree in economics from Saint Mary's College of California in 2008 and a Master of Business Administration from the Chaminade University of Honolulu in 2011.

== Career ==
Elefante began his career as a high school teacher and coach before working on the staff of City Councilman Breene Harimoto and State Senator Will Espero. He was elected to the Honolulu City Council in 2014. He was elected to the Hawaii Senate in 2022.
