= Tyler Dos Santos-Tam =

American politician

- Dos Santos-Tam in 2025

Member of the Honolulu City Council from the 6th district
- Incumbent
- Assumed office November 29, 2022
- Preceded by: Carol Fukunaga

Chair of the Democratic Party of Hawaii
- In office 2020–2022
- Preceded by: Kate Stanley (interim)
- Succeeded by: Dennis Jung

Personal details
- Born: 1987 or 1988 (age 38–39) Honolulu, Hawaii, U.S.
- Party: Democratic
- Education: Yale University (BA)
- Website: Campaign website

Tyler Fooksin Dos Santos-Tam (born 1987 or 1988) is an American politician serving as a member of the Honolulu City Council, representing District 6, which encompasses Downtown Honolulu, Kakaʻako, Kalihi, and Nuʻuanu. He assumed office in 2022 and was reelected in 2026. Soon after reelection, Dos Santos-Tam was elected as chairperson by a 6 to 2 vote, making him the first openly gay Honolulu City Council chairperson.

== Early life and education ==
Dos Santos-Tam was born and raised in the ʻĀlewa Heights neighborhood of Honolulu, Hawaiʻi. He graduated from Punahou School before attending Yale University, where he was an inductee of Phi Beta Kappa and graduated magna cum laude with a Bachelor of Arts in political science and Portuguese in 2010.

== Career ==
=== Professional and Community Leadership ===
From 2012 to 2018, prior to his election to the City Council, Dos Santos-Tam served as the executive director of the Hawaiʻi Construction Alliance, an organization representing the state's four largest construction unions. He has been a lobbyist for the Hawaii Public Health Institute, the Hawaii Regional Council of Carpenters, and the International Union of Bricklayers and Allied Craftworkers.

In the political sphere, he served as the chair of the Democratic Party of Hawaiʻi from 2014 to 2016. He previously served as president of the Young Democrats of Hawaii, coordinator for Hawaii for Biden, and spokesman for Mufi Hannemann for his unsuccessful run for Congress in 2012.

In 2019, he was appointed as the Honorary Consul for Portugal in Hawaiʻi.

=== Honolulu City Council ===
Dos Santos-Tam was elected to the Honolulu City Council in 2022, defeating Traci Toguchi in the general election. He was re-elected in 2026 after defeating first-time challenger Corey Morihara.

On November 5, 2026, Dos Santos-Tam was elected chairperson by a 6 to 2 vote, although about half of the written testimony was in opposition. The week prior, a private meeting with Dos Santos-Tam and a majority of council members was allegedly held to discuss council leadership; the state Office of Information Practices is investigating whether that meeting was improper.

== Personal life ==
Dos Santos-Tam is openly gay. He is of Chinese, Filipino and Portuguese descent.
