= Laura Acasio =

American politician

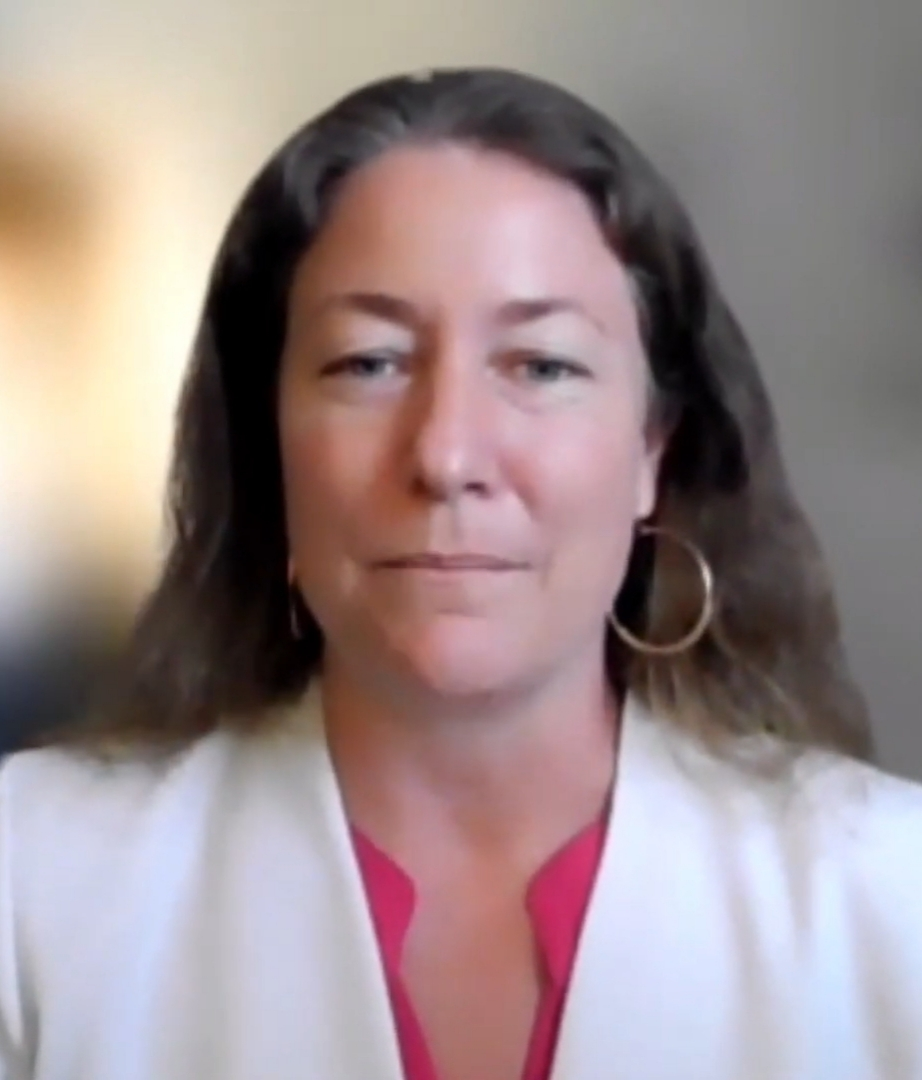

Member of the Hawaii Senate from the 1st district
- In office January 19, 2021 – November 8, 2022
- Appointed by: David Ige
- Preceded by: Kai Kahele
- Succeeded by: Redistricted

Personal details
- Party: Democratic

Laura Ellen Clint Acasio is an American politician who was in the Hawaii Senate from Hawaii's 1st district. She was appointed to the seat by Governor David Ige after incumbent Democrat Kai Kahele won a seat in the United States House of Representatives.

== Biography ==
Acasio was born in Los Angeles. She moved to Hawaii, and studied at the University of Hawaiʻi, earning a degree in geology. She worked as a teacher and a substitute at over fifteen schools, including at Haaheo Elementary in Wainaku, and worked with multiple non-profits as an environmentalist. She has two children.

She was appointed on January 19, 2021 by Governor David Ige to the Hawaii Senate, representing District 1, Hilo, Hawaii. She served on the committees for Agriculture & Environment, Hawaiian Affairs, Human Services and Judiciary.

Acasio had previously called for Governor Ige's impeachment over his handling of the Thirty Meter Telescope protests.

Acasio wrote a letter in 2021 to the Department of Hawaiian Home Lands to request protesters, who some consider illegal squatters on public lands, to be allowed to remain camped on Mauna Kea.

She faults wealthy investors for driving up cost of homes in Hawaii. She is quoted as saying in the Hawaii Tribune-Herald: “This allows wealthy investors to have a feeding frenzy on luxury homes. That frenzy ultimately drives up the cost of land and rental prices in Hawaii."
