= Bennette Misalucha =

American politician

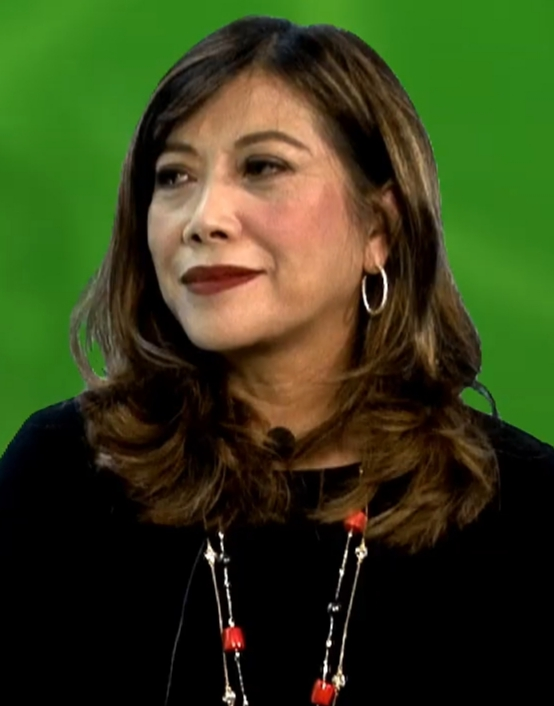
- Misalucha in 2019

Member of the Hawaii Senate from the 16th district
- In office July 10, 2020 – November 8, 2022
- Appointed by: David Ige
- Preceded by: Breene Harimoto
- Succeeded by: Brandon Elefante

Personal details
- Born: Manila, Philippines
- Party: Democratic
- Children: 2
- Education: University of Hawaiʻi at Mānoa (BA)

Bennette Espineli Misalucha is an American politician who served as a member of the Hawaii Senate for the 16th district from 2020 to 2022. She was appointed to the seat after incumbent Democrat Breene Harimoto died. She won a special election to fill the term in 2020, but lost re-nomination to Brandon Elefante in 2022.

== Early life and education ==
Misalucha was born in Manila and raised in Davao City and Cebu in the Philippines; her mother, Avelina Espineli, was a school teacher and her father, Benjamin Robledo, was an insurance executive. She immigrated to Hawaii in the early 1980s.

Misalucha attended the University of the Philippines Cebu College, but dropped out during her senior year to work for DYCB-TV. She graduated from the University of Hawaiʻi at Mānoa with a bachelor's degree in communications/journalism and graduate studies at the University of Wisconsin-Madison.

== Career ==
Misalucha previously worked as a broadcast journalist at KHON-TV and DYCB-TV from 1980 to 1984. She was the executive director of the Hawai’i Crop Improvement Association, vice president at Actus Lend Lease, and also a former senior vice president at Central Pacific Bank. She was also a former lobbyist for Pacific Resource Partnership (PRP) and was a public relations subcontractor for the Honolulu rail project.

She is currently the executive director of the Hawaii Workforce Development Council.

=== Hawaii State Senate ===
Following incumbent Democratic state senator Breene Harimoto death from pancreatic cancer, governor David Ige appointed Misalucha to fill his term. She won a special election to fill the term in 2020 with 52.7% of the vote, defeating Republican candidate Kelly Puamailani Kitashima.

In 2022, Honolulu City Councilmember Brandon Elefante challenged Misalucha in the Democratic primary election. He defeated her in a landslide with 70.83% to her 29.17% of the vote.

== Electoral history ==
=== 2022 ===
2022 Hawaii Senate District 16 Democratic primary results
Party	Candidate	Votes	%
Democratic	Brandon Elefante	9,680	70.83
Democratic	Bennette Misalucha (incumbent)	3,987	29.17
Total votes		13,667	100.00

=== 2020 ===
Hawaii's 16th Senate District special general election, 2020
Party	Candidate	Votes	%
Democratic	Bennette Misalucha (incumbent)	11,508	52.7
Republican	Kelly Kitashima	10,335	47.3
Total votes		21,843	100.0
Democratic hold			

== Personal life ==
Misalucha has a daughter and son, Danielle and Christian Evangelista. She resides in ʻAiea, Hawaii.

== Awards and honours ==
- Banaag Award, Commission on Filipinos Overseas (2022)
- President Biden Lifetime Achievement Award, The Outstanding Filipino Awards (2024)
