= Kate Stanley (politician) =

American politician

Interim Chair of the Democratic Party of Hawaiʻi
- In office August 10, 2019 – August 2020
- Preceded by: Kealiʻi Lopez
- Succeeded by: Tyler Dos Santos-Tam

Member of the Hawaii House of Representatives
- In office 1982–1984
- Preceded by: District established
- Succeeded by: Redistricted
- Constituency: 22nd District
- In office 1974–1982 Serving with Russell Blair
- Preceded by: District established
- Succeeded by: District redrawn
- Constituency: 14th District

Personal details
- Born: 1942 or 1943 (age 83–84) New York, U.S.
- Party: Democratic
- Spouse: Wallace Weatherwax
- Education: Muskingum University; Syracuse University (MEd)
- Occupation: Politician, government official

Kathleen G. (Kate) Stanley is an American politician and government official from Hawaii. A member of the Democratic party, Stanley was the first female majority floor leader of the Hawaii House of Representatives.

Stanley served in the Hawaii House of Representatives from 1974 to 1984 and later served as interim chair of the Democratic Party of Hawaiʻi from 2019 to 2020. Over a five-decade career in Hawaii state government, she also served as deputy director of the Hawaii Department of Human Services from 1995 to 2002 and held other advisory and legislative liaison roles under four governors and three state superintendents of education.

== Early life and education ==
Stanley was born in New York. Stanley graduated from Muskingum University in Ohio and received her master's degree in education from Syracuse University.

== Career ==
Stanley moved to Hawaii in 1967 as a volunteer with Volunteers in Service to America (VISTA) with an assignment to the Queen Liliʻuokalani Children's Center in Waimānalo, Oahu. She later worked for the social welfare development and research center at the University of Hawaiʻi.

=== Hawaii House of Representatives ===
Stanley was elected to the Hawaii House of Representatives in 1974. She served in the House for ten years, including as the first female majority floor leader and as chair of the judiciary committee. She was first elected to House District 14 (Kakaako-Punchbowl) and served in a multi-member district alongside Russell Blair. In 1984, Stanley lost renomination in the Democratic primary elections to Galen Onouye for the redistricted House District 35 (Kakaako-Downtown).

=== State government administration ===
Following her tenure in the legislature, Stanley worked as a legislative liaison and senior advisor across the administrations of Governors John Waiheʻe, Ben Cayetano, Neil Abercrombie, and David Ige. Under Governor Cayetano, she served as the deputy director for the Hawaii Department of Human Services from 1995 to 2002.

After serving on Abercrombie's 2010 transition team, she joined Abercrombie's executive office in September 2011 as a senior advisor, working on legislative initiatives including the 2012 Kakaʻako land settlement between the state and the Office of Hawaiian Affairs before stepping down from the post in September 2013.

Stanley also worked for the Hawaii State Department of Education under Superintendents Pat Hamamoto, Kathryn Matayoshi, and Keith Hayashi.

=== Democratic Party of Hawaiʻi ===
Long active in state party governance, Stanley served as Hawaii's Democratic National Committeewoman in 2008. On August 10, 2019, following the resignation of party chair Kealiʻi Lopez, the State Central Committee elected Stanley as interim chair of the Democratic Party of Hawaiʻi. She oversaw the party's precinct elections, presidential preference poll, and 2020 state convention before being succeeded by Tyler Dos Santos-Tam in August 2020.

== Personal life ==
Stanley is married to Wallace Weatherwax.
