= Kai Kahele =

American politician (born 1974)

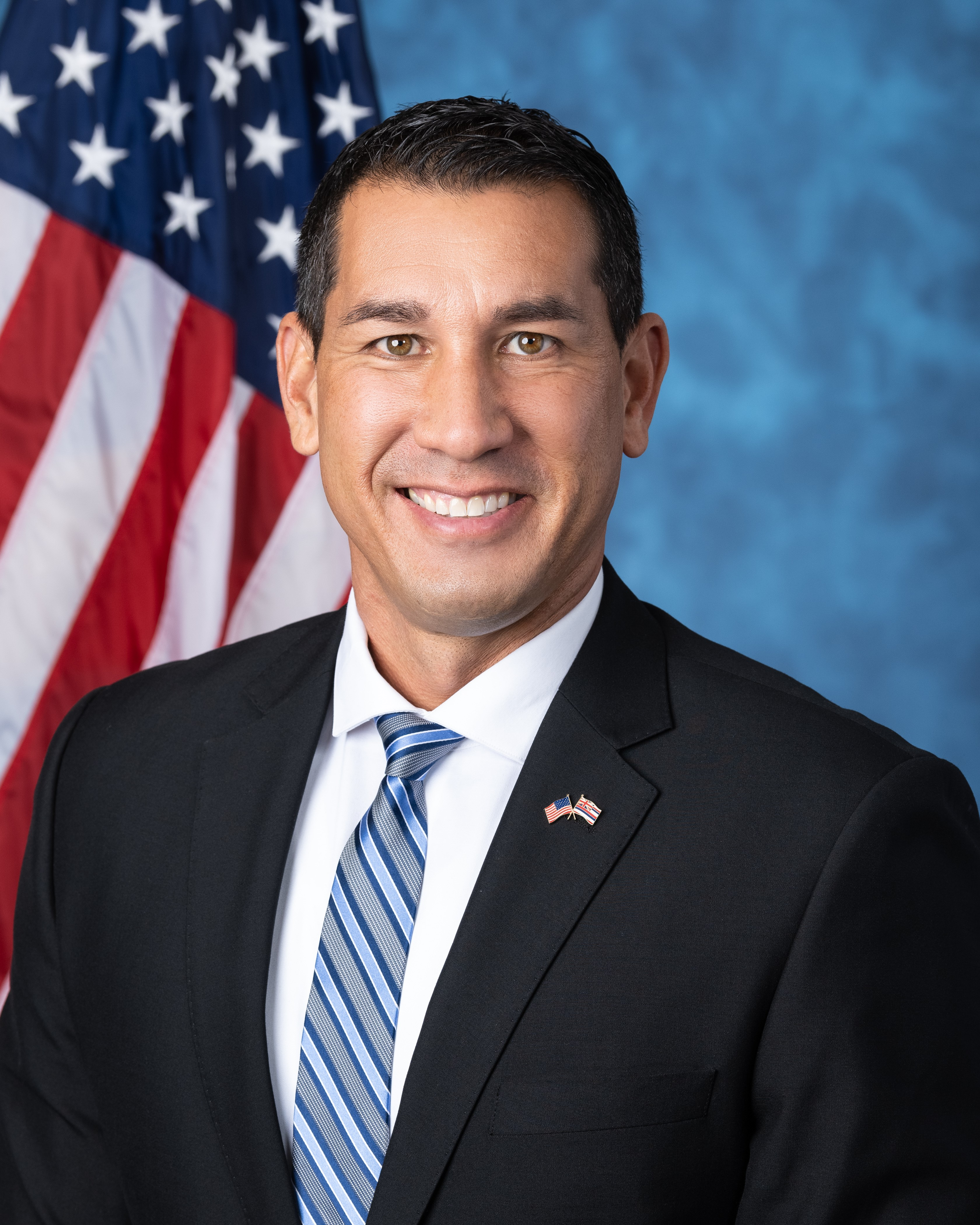
- Official portrait, 2021

Chair of the Office of Hawaiian Affairs Board of Trustees
- Incumbent
- Assumed office December 5, 2024
- Preceded by: Carmen Hulu Lindsey

Member of the Office of Hawaiian Affairs Board of Trustees
- Incumbent
- Assumed office December 5, 2024
- Preceded by: Mililani Trask
- Constituency: Hawaii Island

Member of the U.S. House of Representatives from Hawaii's 2nd district
- In office January 3, 2021 – January 3, 2023
- Preceded by: Tulsi Gabbard
- Succeeded by: Jill Tokuda

Member of the Hawaii Senate from the 1st district
- In office February 17, 2016 – December 16, 2020
- Preceded by: Gil Kahele
- Succeeded by: Laura Acasio

Personal details
- Born: March 28, 1974 (age 52) Miloli'i, Hawai'i, U.S.
- Party: Democratic
- Spouse: Maria Fe Day
- Children: 3
- Parent: Gil Kahele (father)
- Education: Hawaii Community College (attended); University of Hawaii, Hilo (attended); University of Hawaii, Manoa (BA)

Military service
- Branch/service: United States Air Force
- Years of service: 2001–present
- Rank: Lieutenant Colonel
- Unit: Hawaii Air National Guard
- Battles/wars: Iraq War; War in Afghanistan
- Awards: Air Medal; Armed Forces Reserve Medal; Combat Readiness Medal; Commendation Medal; Meritorious Service Medal; National Defense Service Medal
- Kahele's voice Kahele on the need to reimburse the National Guard for guarding the Capitol after the January 6 attack. Recorded July 21, 2021

Kaialiʻi Kahele (born March 28, 1974) is an American politician, educator, and commercial pilot who served as the U.S. representative for Hawaii's 2nd congressional district from 2021 to 2023. From 2016 to 2020, he served in the Hawaii Senate from the 1st District. In 2024, he was elected as a trustee to the Office of Hawaiian Affairs, with fellow board members electing him as chair. Kahele is a member of the Democratic Party and the son of Hawaii Senate member Gil Kahele.

In January 2019, Kahele announced he would challenge Tulsi Gabbard in Hawaii's 2nd congressional district in 2020, but Gabbard dropped out of the race to focus on her campaign for the Democratic presidential nomination. Kahele won the congressional nomination on August 8, 2020. He won the general election and became the second Native Hawaiian to serve as a member of Congress representing Hawaii since statehood, after Daniel Akaka.

After one term in Congress, Kahele ran for governor in 2022. He was defeated in the Democratic primary by Lieutenant Governor Josh Green. He made a political comeback in 2024, winning an open seat on the Office of Hawaiian Affairs Board of Trustees outright in the primary election by securing 56.7% of the vote.

== Early life and education ==
Kahele is a Native Hawaiian whose family comes from the small fishing village of Miloliʻi in South Kona, where he was born on March 28, 1974. He is the son of Linda Haggberg and Gil Kahele. He graduated from Hilo High School and attended Hawaiʻi Community College and the University of Hawaiʻi at Hilo before earning a Bachelor of Arts in education from the University of Hawaiʻi at Mānoa in 1998.

== Career ==
=== Military service ===
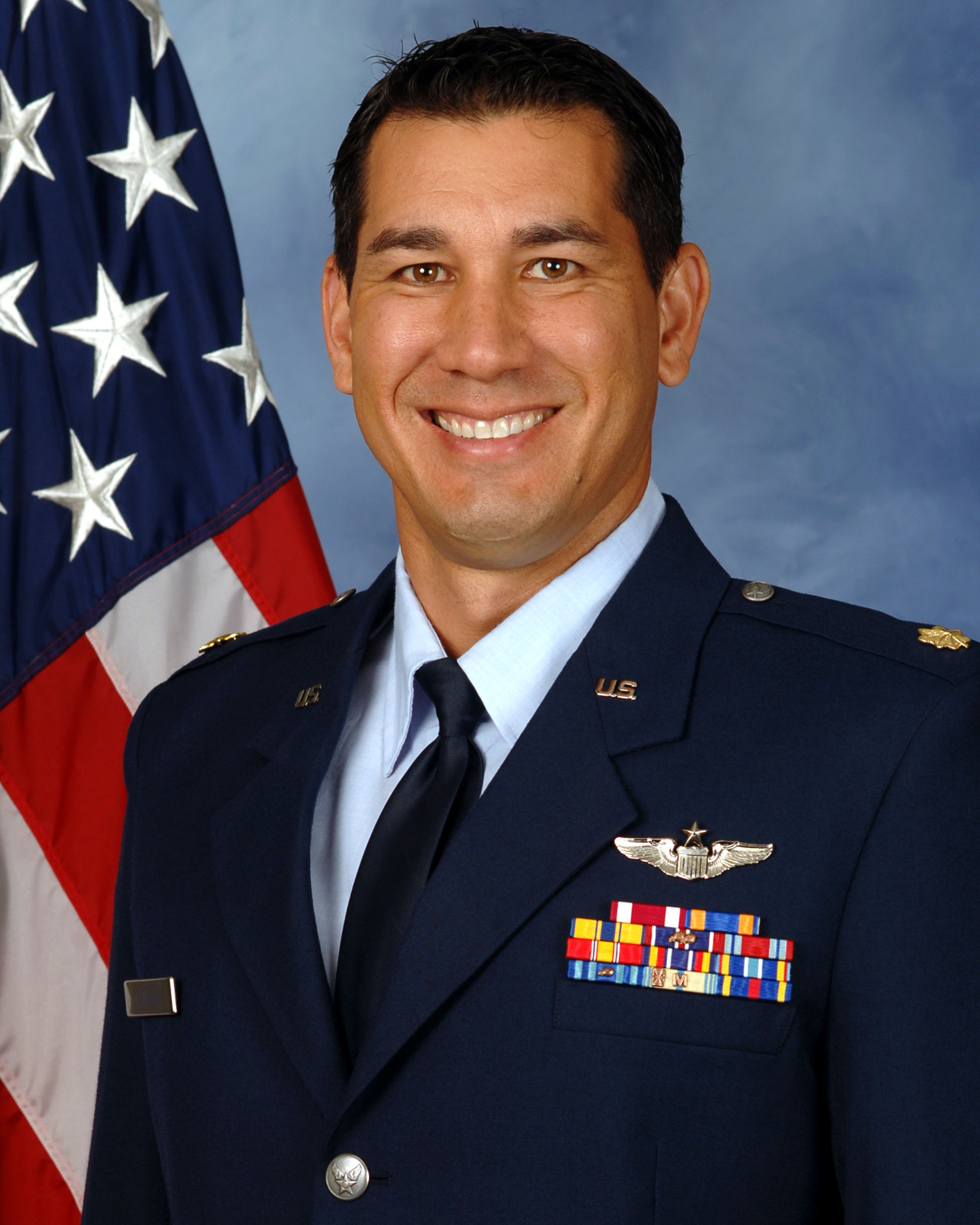
Kahele in uniform

Kahele is a military and civilian pilot. He is a commissioned officer in the Hawaii Air National Guard, where he continues to serve as a lieutenant colonel with the 201st Air Mobility Operations Squadron at Hickam Air Force Base. Kahele is a decorated combat veteran with multiple deployments to both Iraq and Afghanistan since 2005. He flew 108 combat sorties, logged 3,075 hours of military flight time, and commanded C-17 combat missions. Kahele has received numerous awards, including the Meritorious Service Medal, the Commendation Medal, the Air Medal for combat missions flown in Afghanistan, the National Defense Service Medal, the Global War on Terrorism Service Medal, Armed Forces Reserve Medal, Hawaii State Active Duty Medal and the Combat Readiness Medal. He has been named both Pacific Air Forces Guard Officer of the Year and Hawaiʻi Air National Guard Officer of the Year.

Kahele also flies as a civilian pilot for Hawaiian Airlines, and has served as an adjunct faculty member at the University of Hawaiʻi at Hilo.

=== Hawaii State Senate ===
Kahele was appointed to the 1st district of the Hawaii Senate on February 16, 2016, after the death of his father, Gil Kahele. Kahele defeated Dennis "Fresh" Onishi in the August 2016 Democratic primary, 57% to 35%, and Libertarian Kimberly Arianoff in the November general election. He won the 2018 general election by a wide margin.

In 2019, Kahele was selected to serve as the Majority Floor Leader in the Senate and as chairman of the Senate Committee on Water and Land. He was a member of the Ways and Means, Hawaiian Affairs and Higher Education committees. During the 19th Annual Western Legislative Academy (WLA), lawmakers from other states elected Kahele as the class president of the Council of State Governments (CSG) West. He represented the WLA and all alumni as an executive committee member of CSG West.

Kahele has vowed to reform the University of Hawaiʻi System, declaring that the "system is broken". He introduced SB 1161 in 2017 to freeze tuition until 2027. The bill did not advance. Kahele introduced SB 2329 in 2018 calling for reduction in tuition at UH campuses. The bill has been criticized for reducing the university's ability to manage its finances.

Kahele backed passage and enactment of a measure establishing the Hilo Community Economic Division to pave the way for County and State investment in Hilo and East Hawaii's economic future. He was a key supporter in developing a bachelor of science in commercial aviation program that will commence in the fall of 2019 at the University of Hawaiʻi at Hilo. Other legislative priorities for Kahele were Banyan Drive redevelopment and funding for rat lungworm disease research. HB 2014 for $1M in research funding related to rat lungworm disease at UH Hilo was introduced in the Hawaii House but has not advanced.

In 2017, Kahele served as Vice Chair of the Education Committee, Chair of the Higher Education Committee, and member of Housing and Ways and Means Committees.

On December 16, 2020, Kahele resigned from the Hawaii Senate in preparation to assume office in the United States House of Representatives.

== U.S. House of Representatives ==
=== Elections ===
==== 2020 ====
In January 2019, Kahele started his campaign for the House of Representatives from Hawaii's 2nd congressional district. Incumbent Representative Tulsi Gabbard, who had run for president, stated on October 25 that she would not run for another term in Congress. Kahele won the primary election on August 8, 2020, and went on to win the general election by over 30 points.

=== Tenure ===
Kahele voted in favor of impeaching Trump for a second time following the 2021 storming of the United States Capitol. In his first floor speech in Congress, he spoke in favor of impeaching Trump, claiming Trump had violated his oath of office by inciting a “deadly insurrection”. He also said, "our sacred oaths are hollow without accountability".

From February to April 2022, Kahele cast all 120 votes by proxy while working part-time as a commercial pilot for Hawaiian Airlines. Reports about his prolonged absence from Washington and outside employment led to a House Ethics Committee investigation into whether he misused official resources for his gubernatorial campaign. Two weeks after the scrutiny began, he retired from Congress to run for governor of Hawaii in the 2022 election, and as a result, the committee dropped its investigation.

=== Committee assignments ===
- Committee on Armed Services
  - Subcommittee on Tactical Air and Land Forces
  - Subcommittee on Readiness
- Committee on Transportation and Infrastructure
  - Subcommittee on Aviation
  - Subcommittee on Highways and Transit

=== Caucus memberships ===
- Congressional Progressive Caucus

== Electoral history ==
2020 Hawaii 2nd congressional district, Democratic primary
Party	Candidate	Votes	%
Democratic	Kai Kahele	98,675	76.50
Democratic	Brian Evans	12,061	9.35
Democratic	Brenda Lee	10,512	8.15
Democratic	Noelle Famera	7,736	6.00
Total votes		128,984	100.0%

Hawaii's 2nd congressional district, 2020
Party	Candidate	Votes	%
Democratic	Kai Kahele	171,517	63.01
Republican	Joe Akana	84,027	30.87
Libertarian	Michelle Rose Tippens	6,785	2.49
Aloha ʻĀina	Jonathan Hoomanawanui	6,453	2.37
Nonpartisan	Ron Burrus	2,659	0.98
American Shopping	John Giuffre	661	0.24
Total votes		272,192	100.0
Democratic hold			

2022 Hawaii gubernatorial election, Democratic primary
Party	Candidate	Votes	%
Democratic	Josh Green	144,394	63.2
Democratic	Vicky Cayetano	47,756	20.9
Democratic	Kai Kahele	33,654	14.7
Democratic	Van Tanabe	1,096	0.5
Democratic	Richard Kim	892	0.4
Democratic	David Bourgoin	518	0.2
Democratic	Clyde Lewman	206	0.1
Total votes		228,516	100.00

== Personal life ==
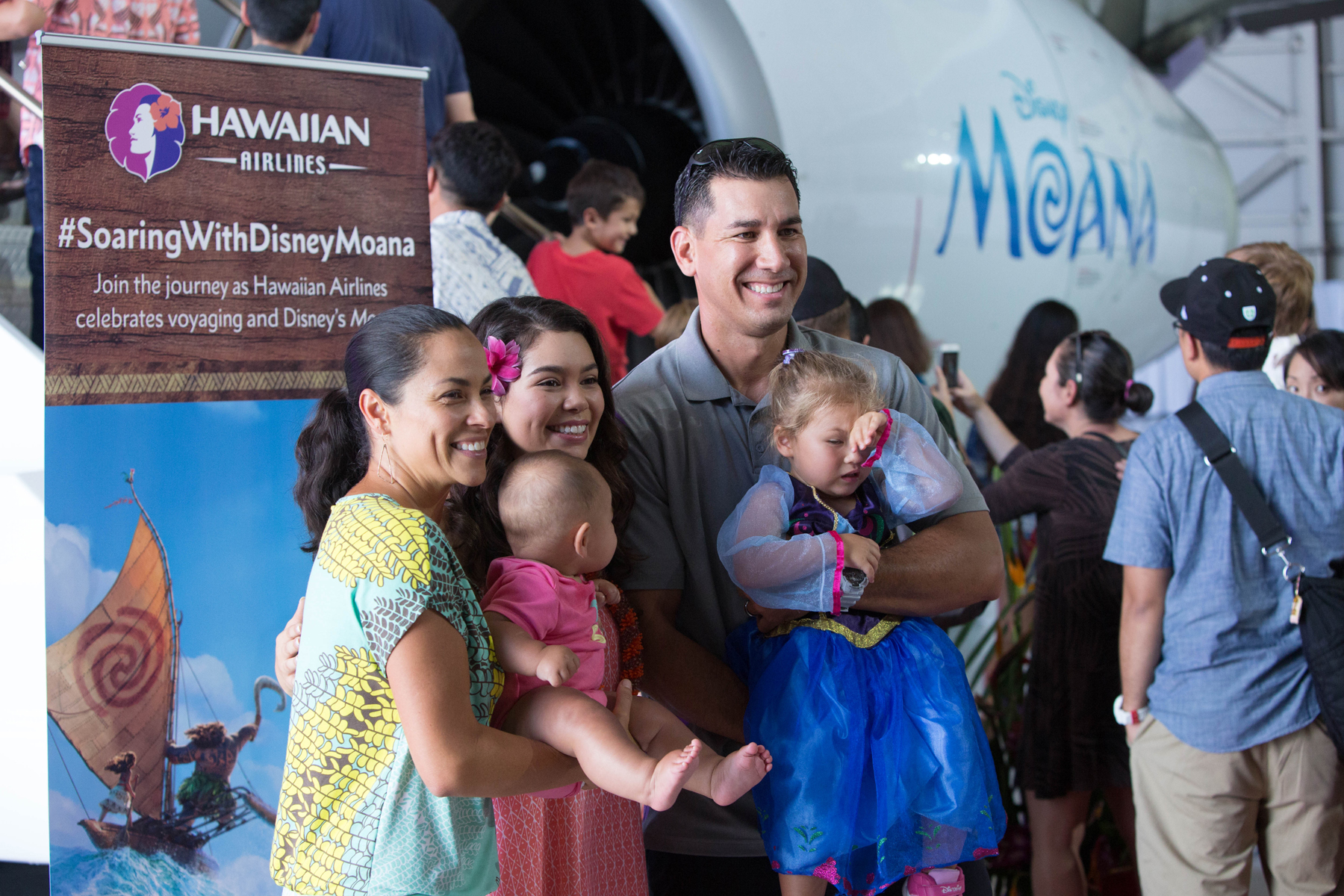
Kahele with his family visiting Hawaiian Airlines's Moana airplane, with Auli‘i Cravalho (center) who voiced the titular character in the film

As a member of the University of Hawai‘i at Mānoa's Rainbow Warriors NCAA Division I Men's volleyball team, Kahele was voted "most inspirational teammate" by his team in 1997. He and his wife live with their daughters in Hilo, his lifetime home on Hawai‘i Island.

== See also ==
- List of Asian Americans and Pacific Islander Americans in the United States Congress

U.S. House of Representatives
Preceded by Tulsi Gabbard	Member of the U.S. House of Representatives from Hawaii's 2nd congressional district 2021–2023	Succeeded by Jill Tokuda
Political offices
Preceded by Mililani Trask	Member of the Office of Hawaiian Affairs Board of Trustees from the Hawaii Island district 2024–present	Incumbent
Preceded by Carmen Hulu Lindsey	Chair of the Office of Hawaiian Affairs Board of Trustees; 2024–present	Incumbent
U.S. order of precedence (ceremonial)
Preceded by Mary Peltola as Former U.S. Representative	Order of precedence of the United States as Former U.S. Representative	Succeeded by Kwanza Hall as Former U.S. Representative
