= Gil Kahele =

American politician

Member of the Hawaii State Senate
- In office January 11, 2011 – January 26, 2016
- Appointed by: Neil Abercrombie
- Preceded by: Russell S. Kokubun
- Succeeded by: Kai Kahele
- Constituency: 2nd district (2011–2012); 1st district (2012–2016)

Personal details
- Born: Gilbert Kahele; May 15, 1942 Milolii, Territory of Hawaii
- Died: January 26, 2016 (aged 73) Honolulu, Hawaii, U.S.
- Party: Democratic
- Spouse: Linda Haggberg (m. 1971)
- Children: 2 (including Kai)
- Education: Laney College (AS)
- Website: senatorkahele.com

Military service
- Branch/service: United States Marine Corps
- Years of service: 1960–1964

Gilbert Kahele (May 15, 1942 – January 26, 2016) was an American politician and a Democratic member of the Hawaii Senate from January 16, 2011, representing District 1. He was appointed by Governor Neil Abercrombie to fill the vacancy caused by the appointment of Russell S. Kokubun as Hawaii Commissioner of Agriculture. Kahele died in office on January 26, 2016, after being hospitalized one week prior.

== Early life and education ==
The son of Peter and Rebecca Kahele, both of Native Hawaiian descent, Gilbert was the third of six children. Kahele was born in a grass shack in Kalihi, just south of the Hawaiian fishing village of Miloliʻi in South Kona.

Kahele attended Hilo High School, played on the Vikings football team, and graduated in 1960. Kahele served in the United States Marine Corps for four years in the engineering troop responsible for refrigeration. After the military, Kahele graduated with an Associate degree in Science in 1967 from Oakland City College in Oakland, California.

== Career ==
Kahele moved back to Hawaiʻi where he began a civil service career that would last 33 years. He started with the Federal Government as a refrigeration mechanic at Naval Station Wahiawa. He advanced in positions at the Pohakuloa Training Area, to supervision and management. After 25 years, he retired in 2000 as the Director of Public Works of the facility.

Governor Neil Abercrombie selected Kahele to represent Senate District Two on Hawaiʻi Island after Senator Russell S. Kokubun resigned his seat to take a position in Abercrombie's cabinet in January 2011. Kahele was unopposed for both the August 11, 2012 Democratic primary and the November 6, 2012 general election.

== Personal life ==
He married United Airlines stewardess Linda Haggberg in October 1971, and the couple lived in Wahiawa. In 1976, the couple moved to Hilo. They had two children, Kai and Noelani.

Kahele died early on January 26, 2016, after a short illness. He had to miss the 2016 Hawaii State Legislature's opening day. His son Kai Kahele won the special election to succeed him.
