= T. C. Yim =

American politician (1922–2014)

Tai Choy Yim (November 5, 1922 – April 2014) was an American politician in the state of Hawaii. He served in the Hawaii House of Representatives from 1963 to 1968 and 1971 to 1974 as a Democrat for the 14th district, and Hawaii State Senate from 1975 to 1980. He later served as administrator of the Office of Hawaiian Affairs from 1982 to 1985.

== Biography ==
A 1941 graduate of Kamehameha Schools, Yim attended the University of Hawaii and University of Michigan, earning a degree in political science with a minor in philosophy. He also was a track athlete and football player in his youth. He was part-Native Hawaiian. Yim was married to Ethel Momoyo Wakugawa in 1956; his wife died in 2008.
