= Dru Kanuha =

American politician

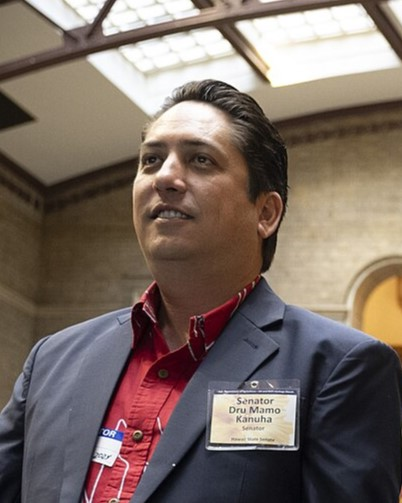
- Kanuha in 2024

Majority Leader of the Hawaii Senate
- Incumbent
- Assumed office May 5, 2021
- Preceded by: J. Kalani English

Member of the Hawaii Senate from the 3rd district
- Incumbent
- Assumed office November 6, 2018
- Preceded by: Josh Green

Personal details
- Born: Dru Mamo Kanuha; 1983 or 1984 (age 41–42)
- Party: Democratic
- Education: University of San Diego (BA)

Dru Mamo Kanuha is an American politician currently serving in the Hawaii Senate from Hawaii's 3rd district. He was elected to the seat after incumbent Democrat Josh Green ran for Lieutenant Governor of Hawaii. He defeated Libertarian candidate Michael Last in the general election, winning 79.3% to 20.7%.

In May 2021, Kanuha was named Majority Leader of the Hawaii Senate after J. Kalani English retired amid health complications from COVID-19.

Hawaii Senate
Preceded by J. Kalani English	Majority Leader of the Hawaii Senate; 2021–present	Incumbent
