= Rosalyn Baker =

American politician (born 1946)

Member of the Hawaii Senate from the 6th district 5th (2002–2012)
- In office November 2002 – November 2022
- Preceded by: Redistricted
- Succeeded by: Angus McKelvey

Member of the Hawaii Senate from the 4th district
- In office November 26, 1993 – November 1998
- Appointed by: John Waihee
- Preceded by: Russell Blair
- Succeeded by: Jan Buen

Member of the Hawaii House of Representatives from the 7th district 10th (1988–1992)
- In office November 1988 – 1993
- Succeeded by: Michael B. White

Personal details
- Born: September 20, 1946 (age 80) El Campo, Texas
- Party: Democratic
- Education: Southwest Texas State University; University of Southwestern Louisiana
- Website: rozbaker.com

Rosalyn Hester (Roz) Baker (born September 20, 1946) is an American politician. She was a Democratic member of the Hawaii State Legislature for over 30 years. Baker last served in the Hawaii Senate for District 6 from November 2012 to November 2022. She served consecutively from 2002 until 2012 in the District 5 seat, and previously served from 1993 until 1998, having served consecutively in the Hawaii State Legislature from 1988 until 1993 in the Hawaii House of Representatives. Baker was appointed by Governor John D. Waiheʻe III to the Senate on November 26, 1993 and served as the Senate Chair of Commerce and Consumer Protection.

== Early life ==
Baker was born on September 20, 1946, in El Campo, Texas. She graduated from Southwest Texas State University (now Texas State University) with a bachelors of arts degree in political science and speech in 1968 and received a masters of arts degree from the University of Southwestern Louisiana (now the University of Louisiana at Lafayette) in 1969. She has cited her defining moment to become involved in politics to be at Texas State University when, as a student, she advocated for lowering the voting age to 18. She then became a lobbyist and assistant director of the National Education Association in Washington D.C. From 1980 to 1987, she worked as the owner of a sporting goods store on Maui.

== Political career ==
=== Electoral history ===
Baker first ran for the Hawaii House of Representatives in 1986, where she lost by six votes. Baker was eventually elected as a representative in the 1988 general election. During her first term, she was appointed as the House majority leader. She was re-elected in 1990. Baker won the three-way 1992 Democratic primary with 2,431 votes, and won the general election with 4,340 votes (66.0%) against Republican Gene Viglione.

Baker was appointed to the Hawaii Senate in 1993 by Governor John Waihee, taking over from Senator Russell Blair in District 4. She won the 1994 Democratic primary with 3,828 votes (53.1%) against Jan Buen, and won the general election with 9,418 votes (74.6%) against Republican Zane Dittman. In 1998, Baker lost the primary to Buen, who held the seat from 1999 until 2003. She was redistricted to District 5 in 2002 and with Senator J. Kalani English redistricted to District 6, Baker ran unopposed in the Democratic primary, winning with 2,107 votes. She won the general election with 5,556 votes (49.1%) against Republican nominee Don Couch. In 2004, Baker and Couch were both unopposed in their primaries, setting up a rematch. She once again won the general election, with 8,271 votes (56.3%) against Couch. Baker won the 2008 primary with 2,646 votes (67.2%), and won the general election with 8,506 votes (53.7%) against Republican nominee Jan Shields.

In 2012, Baker was redistricted to District 6, and with English redistricted to District 7, Baker was unopposed in the August primary, winning with 3,457 votes, and won the general election with 9,808 votes (67.3%) against Republican nominee Bart Mulvihill, her primary challenger from 2008, having changed parties.

After over 30 years in public service, Baker announced her retirement at the end of the 2022 legislative session.

=== Legislative priorities ===
Baker was the co-chair of the Senate Women's Legislative Caucus and advocated for women's rights. She has also pushed for legislation on health care policy and kupuna care.

In August 2021, Baker called for the firing of Maui District Health Officer Dr. Lorrin Pang, for his professional opinion on COVID-19 treatment. That same month, the Hawaii Medical Board filed a complaint with the Regulated Industries Complaints Office (RICO) under Hawaii's Department of Commerce & Consumer Affairs, and a formal investigation was brought against Pang. In April 2022 the department determined that there was "insufficient evidence of a licensing law violation." Pang later asked for a formal official apology from legislators, including Baker, for her part in the allegations.

== Personal life ==
Baker is a cancer survivor and has volunteered with the American Cancer Society.

During the 2023 Maui fire, Baker lost her Lahaina apartment while giving visitors a ride to the airport.
