= Brickwood Galuteria =

American politician

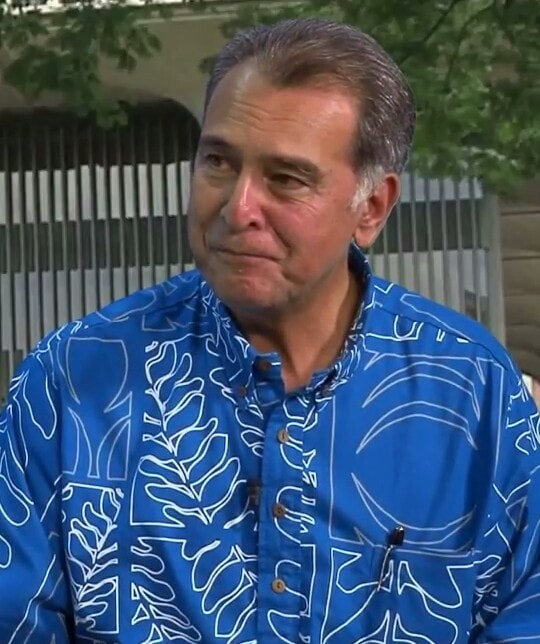
- Galuteria in 2017

Member of the Office of Hawaiian Affairs Board of Trustees
- Incumbent
- Assumed office December 8, 2022
- Preceded by: Lei Ahu Isa; Brendon Kaleiʻaina Lee
- Constituency: At-large

Majority Leader of the Hawaii Senate
- In office November 2, 2010 – November 4, 2014
- Preceded by: Gary Hooser
- Succeeded by: J. Kalani English

Member of the Hawaii Senate from the 12th district
- In office November 4, 2008 – November 6, 2018
- Preceded by: Gordon Trimble
- Succeeded by: Sharon Moriwaki

Chair of the Hawaii Democratic Party
- In office May 30, 2004 – May 28, 2006
- Preceded by: Lorraine Akiba
- Succeeded by: Mike McCartney

Personal details
- Born: November 15, 1955 (age 70) Honolulu, Hawaii, U.S.
- Party: Democratic
- Education: Pacific University (BA)
- Website: Official website

Brickwood Maikaaloa Galuteria (born November 15, 1955), is an American politician, radio host, musician and actor. He was the Hawaii State Senator representing District 12 of Honolulu. He previously served as state chairman of the Democratic Party of Hawaii (2004–2006). In 2022, he was elected to the Office of Hawaiian Affairs Board of Trustees as an At-Large member.

== Early years ==
Brickwood M. Galuteria was born in 1955 in Honolulu, Hawaii, he is of Portuguese, Hawaiian, Filipino, and English descent. Galuteria was born and raised in the Kaka‘ako and Kapahulu areas and attended Kamehameha Schools since kindergarten. Galuteria's family were mostly blue-collar workers. His father, Arnold, worked for United Airlines and was president of his union. His mother, Juliette, worked for the City and County of Honolulu at City Hall. The family lived across from what now is the John A. Burns School of Medicine.

He attended the weeklong Executive Education Program at the John F. Kennedy School of Government at Harvard University.

After high school and some college, Galuteria went to work for Hawaiian Airlines, eventually becoming an account executive and tour director.

== Entertainment career ==
Galuteria gave up corporate life to pursue interests in music and meeting people in the entertainment industry. He performed music with Marlene Sai at the Royal Hawaiian Hotel for three years and later forming a group of his own. He also won a coveted Na Hoku Hanohano Award in 1985 for Male Vocalist of the Year and Most Promising Artist.

In 1980, Galuteria began his radio career on air with KCCN 1420 AM, and later with KCCN-FM 100 and Hawaiian 105 KINE. He currently hosts the Na ʻOiwi ʻOlino "People Seeking Wisdom" morning show on AM940 KKNE with Kimo Kahoano. Galuteria also worked in television, film and video, serving as host on such local shows as Hawaii's Kitchen, Treasures and the Easter Seals Telethon on KHON-2 and KITV4's Ho‘oulu Lahui Aloha.

Galuteria has been a spokesman for the State of Hawaii's Department of Agriculture, the Hawaii Visitors and Convention Bureau, Bank of Hawaii and Mike McKenna's Windward Ford, in addition to commercial voice-over work he's done for numerous in-house TV, radio and political campaigns. He has also produced and promoted numerous productions, including the Aloha Festival Concerts, Miss Hawaii Pageants and the Coca-Cola Beach Concert Series.

He was an actor on television with roles on Hawaii Five-0 (2013) and Magnum, P.I. (1986).

== Politics ==
Galuteria served as chairman for the Democratic Party of Hawaii from 2004 until 2006.

He served as the Hawaii State Senator, representing District 12 from November 4, 2008 until November 6, 2018. District 12 encompassed the communities of Waikiki, Ala Moana, Kaka'ako, and portions of McCully-Mo'ili'ili in Honolulu. He was elected to office in the 2008 general election and upon his swearing-in he was assigned to serve on the following four major committees: Ways & Means (WAM), Education & Housing (EDH), Public Safety and Military Affairs (PSM), and named Vice-Chair of the Committee on Tourism (TSM).

Party political offices
Preceded by Lorraine Akiba	Chair of the Hawaii Democratic Party; 2004–2006	Succeeded by Mike McCartney
Hawaii Senate
Preceded by Gary Hooser	Majority Leader of the Hawaii Senate; 2010–2014	Succeeded by J. Kalani English
Political offices
Preceded by Lei Ahu Isa; Brendon Kaleiʻaina Lee	Member of the Office of Hawaiian Affairs Board of Trustees from the at-large district 2022–present	Incumbent
