= Hawaii Department of Human Services =

U.S. state government agency

The Hawaii Department of Human Services (DHS) is a state agency of Hawaii, headquartered in Honolulu CDP, City and County of Honolulu on the island of Oahu. It has five divisions: Benefit, Employment and Support Services; Division of Vocational Rehabilitation; Med-QUEST Division; Office of Youth Services; and the Social Services Division.

== Divisions ==
=== Benefit, Employment and Support Services Division (BESSD) ===
The Benefit, Employment and Support Services Division (BESSD) is the largest division in the Department of Human Services. It provides social services through nine programs as of 2026. These programs include: housing programs such as the Homeless Programs Office and the Hawaii Home Energy Assistance Program; employment services such as First-To-Work (FTW) and Employment and Training (E&T); childcare through the Child Care Program Office; food support through SNAP (formerly known as food stamps); and other programs such as Assistance for Refugees, the Public Assistance Information System (PAIS), Aid to the Aged, Blind, and Disabled (AABD), and General Assistance.

From 2010-2014, BESSD improved and expanded SNAP services, introduced legislation related to the Temporary Assistance for Needy Families (TANF) program, and established the School Readiness for Our Keiki program.

=== Division of Vocational Rehabilitation ===
The Division of Vocational Rehabilitation (DVR) includes the Statewide Independent Living Program, the State Rehabilitation Council, and Ho'opono Services for the Blind.

=== Med-QUEST Division ===
The Med-QUEST division works to improve the healthcare of the population by expanding access to medical care. From 2022-2025, the division partnered with the ATI Advisory to improve medical support programs.

=== Office of Youth Services ===
The Office of Youth Services (OYS) operates juvenile correctional services. The Hawaii Youth Correctional Facility (HYCF) is the agency's sole long-term confinement center of delinquent youth. It is located on the island of Oahu in Maunawili, City and County of Honolulu, near Kailua. The Project Kealahou partners with the HYCF to provide services for the girls in the facility.

=== Social Services Division ===
The Social Services Division (SSD) includes Child Welfare services and Adult Protective services.

== Attached Agencies ==
The Hawaii Department of Human Services has a handful of attached Agencies such as the Commission on Fatherhood, the Hawai'i Interagency Council on Homelessness, the Hawai'i Public Housing Authority, and the Hawai'i State Commission on the Status of Women.

== History ==
In 2018, DHS launched a new approach to human services called 'Ohana Nui, aiming to concurrently address heath and human service needs for a family, instead of the previous "piece-meal" approach. This is based on the "2Gen" approach advocated for by the Aspen Institute.

As of 2026, the director of DHS is Joseph Campos, and the deputy directors are Trista Speer and Lori-Lei Aponte.
