= Breene Harimoto =

American politician (1954–2020)

Member of the Hawaii Senate from the 16th district
- In office January 21, 2015 – June 18, 2020
- Preceded by: David Ige
- Succeeded by: Bennette Misalucha

Member of the Honolulu City Council from the 8th district
- In office January 2, 2011 – November 2014
- Preceded by: Gary Okino
- Succeeded by: Brandon Elefante

Personal details
- Born: May 6, 1954 Pearl City, Hawaii
- Died: June 18, 2020 (aged 66) Pearl City, Hawaii
- Party: Democratic

Breene Harimoto (May 6, 1954 – June 18, 2020) was an American politician who served in the Hawaii Senate from the 16th district from 2015 to 2020. He served on the Honolulu City Council from the 8th district from 2011 to 2014.

== Career ==
Harimoto was appointed to the Hawaii Board of Education in May 2002 by Governor Ben Cayetano. He served on that board until his resignation in June 2010, and briefly served as the board chair. Prior to his appointment to the board, he had served as the deputy director of the City and County of Honolulu's Department of Information Technology.

== Personal life ==
Harimoto died of pancreatic cancer on June 18, 2020, in Pearl City, Hawaii at the age of 66.
