= J. Kalani English =

American politician

Kalani English
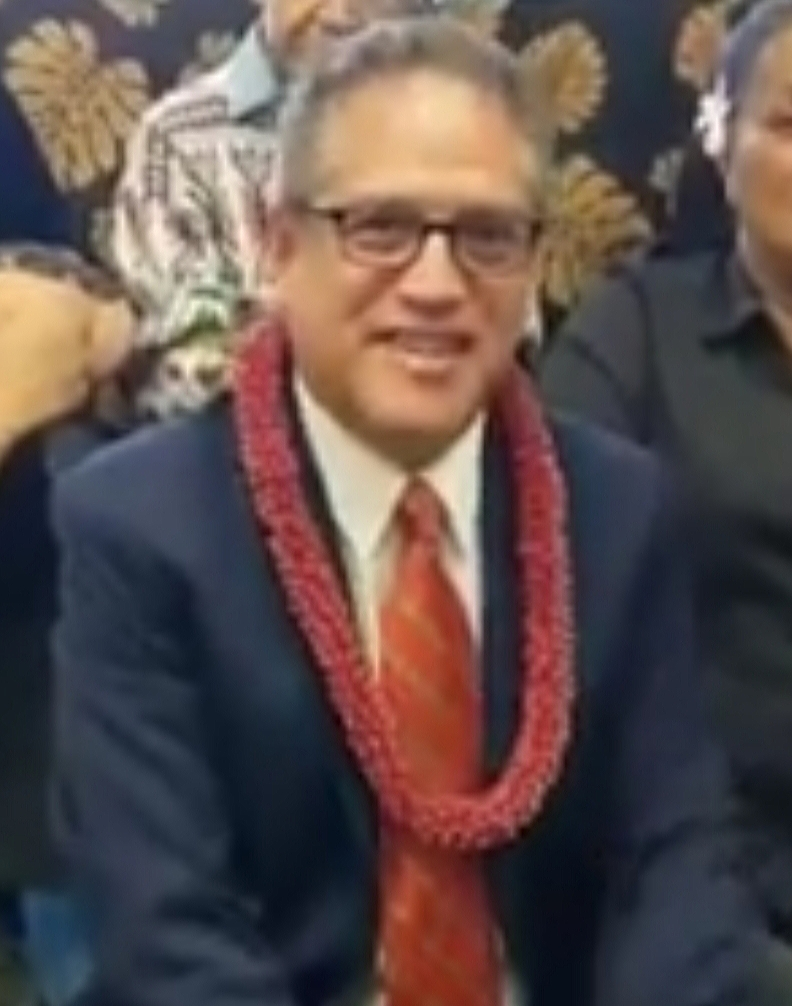

Majority Leader of the Hawaii Senate
- In office November 4, 2014 – May 1, 2021
- Preceded by: Brickwood Galuteria
- Succeeded by: Dru Kanuha

Member of the Hawaii Senate from the 7th district 5th (2000–2002) 6th (2002–2012)
- In office November 2000 – May 1, 2021
- Preceded by: Joe Tanaka
- Succeeded by: Lynn DeCoite

Personal details
- Party: Democratic
- Education: Hawaii Loa College; University of Hawaiʻi at Mānoa (BA); Harvard University (MPA)
- Website: Official website

Jamie Kalani English is a former American politician and was a Democratic member of the Hawaii State Senate representing District 7. English served consecutively from 2001 until 2013 in the District 5 and District 6 seats. English resigned his seat on May 1, 2021, months after having been arrested by Federal agents.

English was charged by the United States Attorney's Office for Hawaii with felony honest services fraud on February 8, 2022 in connection with accepting over $18,000 in cash bribes in exchange for opposing cesspool-related bills while he was a member of the Hawaii State Senate. English has pled guilty to the charge of honest services wire fraud and was sentenced to 40 months in prison.

== Early life and education ==
English earned his Bachelor's degree in Pacific Island studies from Hawaii Loa College, his Master's degree from the University of Hawaiʻi at Mānoa, and attended the John F. Kennedy School of Government. His father is of Jewish descent. He also served on the Maui County Council from 1997 - 2000. English was a member of the 2000 class of the Pacific Century Fellows. After pleading guilty to honest services wire fraud in February 2022, English was sentenced to forty months in prison.

== Elections ==
- In 2000, when Democratic Senator Joe Tanaka retired and left the District 5 seat open, English won the three-way September 23, 2000, Democratic primary with 3,967 votes (48.1%), and won the November 5, 2002, general election with 8,300 votes (53.7%) against Republican nominee Allen Shishido.
- In 2002, redistricted to District 6, and with Democratic Senator Avery Chumbley retired, English was unopposed for the September 21, 2002, Democratic primary, winning with 4,884 votes, and the November 5, 2002, general election.
- In 2004, English was unopposed for the September 18, 2004, Democratic primary, winning with 4,675 votes, and won the three-way November 2, 2004, general election with 12,362 votes (67.0%) against Republican nominee Robb Finberg and Green Party candidate Shaun Stenshol.
- In 2008, English was unopposed for the September 20, 2008, Democratic primary, winning with 4,974 votes, and won the November 4, 2008, general election with 14,030 votes (70.7%) against Independent candidate John Blumer-Buell.
- In 2012, redistricted to District 7, and with Democratic Senator Gary Hooser running for Lieutenant Governor of Hawaii, English won the August 11, 2012, Democratic primary with 5,456 votes (66.8%), and was unopposed for the November 6, 2012, general election.

Hawaii Senate
Preceded by Brickwood Galuteria	Majority Leader of the Hawaii Senate; 2014–2021	Succeeded by Dru Kanuha
