= Clarence Nishihara =

American politician

Clarence K. Nishihara
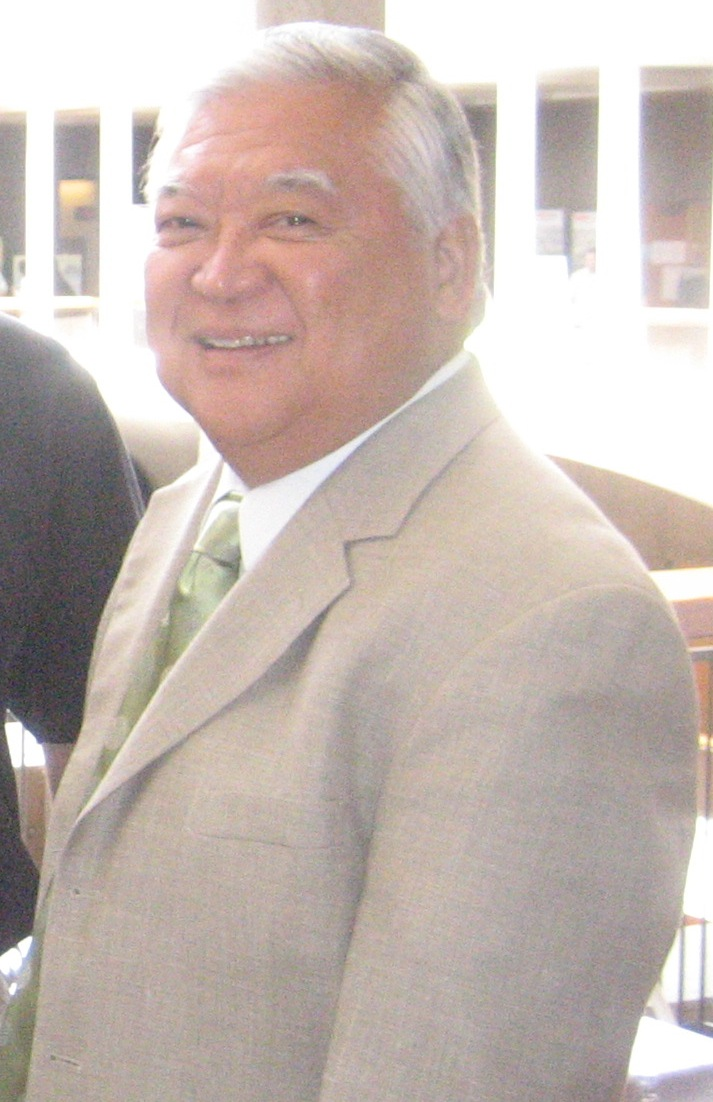
- Nishihara in 2009

Member of the Hawaii Senate from the 17th district 18th (2004–2012)
- In office 2004–2022
- Preceded by: Cal Kawamoto
- Succeeded by: Redistricted

Personal details
- Born: 1942 or 1943 (age 83–84) Makawao, Hawaii
- Party: Democratic

Clarence K. Nishihara (born 1942 or 1943) was a Democratic member of the Hawaii Senate, representing the state's 18th district from 2004 to 2022. He was the Chair of the Committee on Public Safety, Intergovernmental and Military Affairs.

On May 5, 2022, Nishihara announced his retirement after 18 years in the Legislature.
