= Miloliʻi, Hawaii =

Unincorporated community in Hawaii, United States

Coordinates: 19°11′10″N 155°54′26″W

Miloliʻi: Last fishing village in Hawaii.

Miloliʻi is an unincorporated community on the island of Hawaiʻi in the U.S. state of Hawaii, 33 miles south of Kailua-Kona. The village is situated at the seacoast where the 1926 lava flow from Mauna Loa entered the ocean.

Miloliʻi is purported to be "the last Hawaiian fishing village" according to a wooden sign in their community center. Without access to power lines or water, each house provides its own electricity and water with solar panels and tanks that collect rain water. Miloliʻi is on the way to Na'alehu .

On February 5, 1868, a tsunami carried a church, named Hauʻoli Kamanaʻo and swept it away to Miloliʻi. Surprisingly, the church remained in good condition and still stands in Miloliʻi today.

One little bit of celebrity came to Miloliʻi in 1962 when the village was selected for background scenery in the Elvis Presley movie "Girls! Girls! Girls!" A Hollywood film crew spent several weeks in Miloliʻi, with one house in the village used as the home of the Elvis character in the film. Ultimately, only a tiny bit of the Miloliʻi footage actually appeared in the movie, offering just a fleeting glimpse (a few seconds on screen) of the village beach early in the film.

The songbird of Miloliʻi residence, Diana Aki, became a successful singer of Hawaiian music. In the late 1970s she recorded a few records, was featured in a documentary and she also performed in dinner shows at various resort hotels in Hawaii, primarily Kailua-Kona.

Miloliʻi was also the focus of a UCLA anthropological research project in the mid-1970s. The research was led by UCLA professors Robert Edgerton and Douglas Price-Williams, and several graduate students conducted studies along the Kona coast, including Miloliʻi and Hoʻokena beach. Francis Noel Newton's doctoral dissertation Aloha and Hostility in a Hawaiian-American Community: The Private Reality of a Public Image is a study of village life in Miloliʻi.

Dr. Gregory P Asner, the American ecologist makes his home here and conducts many research projects locally.
