= Kealiʻi Lopez =

Hawaiian activist and lobbyist

Chair of the Democratic Party of Hawaiʻi
- In office May 2018 – August 2019
- Preceded by: Tim Vandeveer
- Succeeded by: Kate Stanley

Director of the Hawaii Department of Commerce and Consumer Affairs
- In office December 2010 – 2014
- Governor: Neil Abercrombie
- Preceded by: Ron Boyer
- Succeeded by: Catherine Awakuni Colón

Personal details
- Born: 1960 or 1961 (age 65–66) Waimānalo, Hawaii, U.S.
- Party: Democratic
- Education: Windward Community College; University of Hawaiʻi at Mānoa
- Occupation: Nonprofit executive, lobbyist

Kealiʻi Lopez (born 1960 or 1961) is an American nonprofit executive, lobbyist, and former government official who has been the state director of AARP in Hawaii since 2019. Lopez began her career at Oceanic Cable and helped found 'Ōlelo Community Media, a public-access television nonprofit on Oʻahu. She held several posts there and became its president and chief executive officer in 2004. In 2010, Governor Neil Abercrombie appointed her director of the Hawaii Department of Commerce and Consumer Affairs, a position she held until 2014. In 2018 she was elected chair of the Democratic Party of Hawaiʻi but resigned midway through her two-year term in 2019 to take a nonpartisan position at the AARP.

== Early life and education ==
Lopez was born in Waimānalo, Hawaii in 1960 or 1961. She has a twin sister, Kapua. A graduate of Henry J. Kaiser High School, she attended both Windward Community College and the University of Hawaiʻi at Mānoa. Originally intending to study accounting, she switched her major to communications after becoming involved in video production.

== Career ==
Lopez started her career at Oceanic Cable, where she was director of community programming. In that role, she helped create 'Ōlelo Community Media, a public-access television nonprofit. She later became associate executive director of 'Ōlelo in 1990. After a brief stint working at the Kamehameha Schools, she became the 'Ōlelo's COO in 2000 and stepped into the role of President and CEO in 2004. In her time at 'Ōlelo she promoted greater public access to video creation technology and helped launch community media centers in several schools around Oʻahu.

In December 2010, Lopez was appointed Director of the Hawaii Department of Commerce and Consumer Affairs by Governor Neil Abercrombie. She was confirmed by the Hawaii Senate the following February. Concurrent with this position, she was a board member of the Hawaii Health Connector. She served in the role until 2014 and subsequently became a political lobbyist, working with a local law firm and for Dentons.

In May 2018 she was elected as chairwoman of the Democratic Party of Hawaiʻi for a two-year term. Her stated focus as chairwoman was on increasing voter turnout. She left this position in August 2019 in order to become state director for the AARP, a nonpartisan position. She was succeeded by Kate Stanley as interim chair.

At the AARP, Lopez has advocated for the creation of a state retirement security program and called for increased investment into elder care.

Party political offices
Preceded by Tim Vandeveer	Chair of the Hawaii Democratic Party; 2018–2019	Succeeded by Kate Stanley; Interim
