= 2026 Hawaii Senate election =

- November 3, 2026

13 of the 25 seats in the Hawaii Senate 13 seats needed for a majority
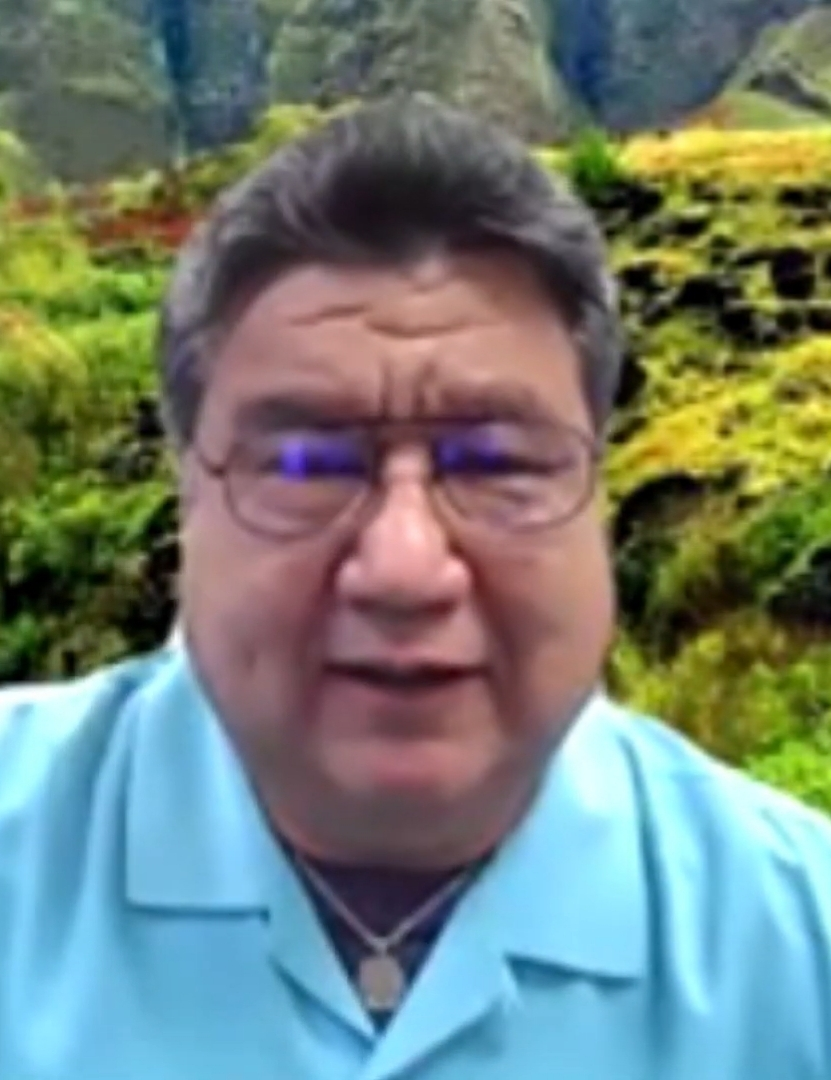

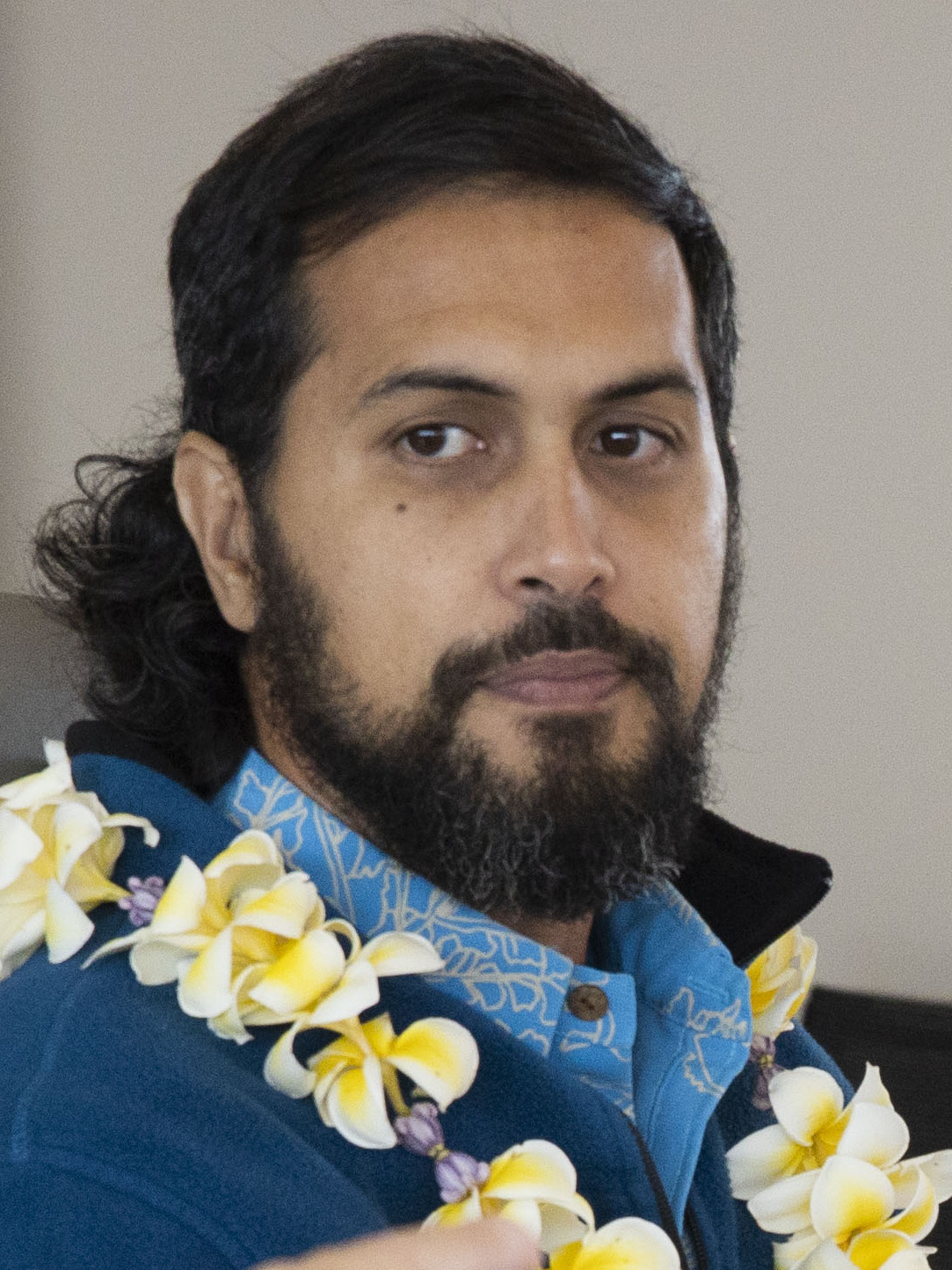
Leader	Ron Kouchi	Brenton Awa
Party	Democratic	Republican
Leader since	May 5, 2015	November 8, 2024
Leader's seat	8–Lihue	23–Kahaluʻu
Last election	68.8%, 12 seats (Note: Of districts last up in 2022)	29.2%, 1 seat
Current seats	22	3
Seats needed	Steady	▲10
Seats up	12	1
- Incumbents: Democratic incumbent Republican incumbent No election
Incumbent President
Ron Kouchi
Democratic

The 2026 Hawaii Senate election was held on Tuesday, November 3, 2026, to elect 13 of 25 representatives to serve four-year terms in the Hawaii Senate. Partisan primaries took place on August 8, 2026. Democrats currently hold a veto-proof supermajority in the chamber.

State senators in Hawaii represent an average of 58,405 residents as of the 2020 United States census. If a primary or general election in a district sees only one candidate file, no election will be held. Four general elections in 2024 were canceled due to lack of competition.

== Summary ==
=== By district ===
- †: Incumbent not running for reelection.
- ‡: Special election.

Unofficial results from the Associated Press.

District	Incumbent	Party	Elected Senator	Party
2nd	Joy San Buenaventura	Dem	Joy San Buenaventura	Dem
5th	Troy Hashimoto	Dem	Troy Hashimoto	Dem
8th	Ron Kouchi	Dem	Ron Kouchi	Dem
9th	Stanley Chang	Dem	Stanley Chang	Dem
10th	Les Ihara Jr.	Dem	Jackson Sayama	Dem
11th	Carol Fukunaga	Dem	Carol Fukunaga	Dem
13th	Karl Rhoads†	Dem	Tricia Nakamatsu	Dem
14th	Donna Mercado Kim	Dem	Donna Mercado Kim	Dem
15th	Glenn Wakai	Dem	Glenn Wakai	Dem
17th	Donovan Dela Cruz	Dem	Donovan Dela Cruz	Dem
18th	Danielle Bass‡	Dem	Danielle Bass	Dem
19th	Rachele Lamosao‡	Dem	Rachele Lamosao	Dem
20th	Kurt Fevella	Rep	Bob McDermott	Rep
21st	Mike Gabbard	Dem	Mike Gabbard	Dem
25th	Chris Lee	Dem	Chris Lee	Dem

== Predictions ==
Source	Ranking	As of
Sabato's Crystal Ball	Safe D	January 22, 2026
State Navigate	Safe D	October 14, 2026

== Background ==
District	County	Reg. voters (2022)	2022 vote	2024 pres.
2nd	Hawaii	31,110	D+43.9	D+26.9
5th	Maui	34,796	D+Unopp. (Note: District 5 had a special election in 2024, but it was also unopposed.)	D+24.7
8th	Kauaʻi	48,494	D+48.3	D+19.5
9th	Honolulu	39,591	D+40.5	D+36.7
10th	Honolulu	32,962	D+34.0	D+42.5
11th	Honolulu	34,811	D+50.6	D+46.1
13th	Honolulu	30,596	D+42.4	D+34.7
14th	Honolulu	26,267	D+47.1	D+18.1
15th	Honolulu	31,254	D+35.4	D+14.0
17th	Honolulu	34,101	D+30.4	D+15.6
20th	Honolulu	31,964	R+Unopp.	R+4.8
21st	Honolulu	33,170	D+17.8	R+4.2
25th	Honolulu	40,051	D+40.6	D+30.2

== Retiring incumbents ==
=== Democrats ===
1. District 13: Karl Rhoads retired.
2. District 18: Michelle Kidani retired on June 30, 2026; Danielle Bass was appointed in August 2026 to serve the rest of her term.

== Incumbents defeated ==
=== In Primary Election ===
1. District 10: Les Ihara Jr. lost renomination to Jackson Sayama.
2. District 20: Kurt Fevella lost renomination to Bob McDermott.

== Detailed results ==
=== District 2 ===
District 2 election
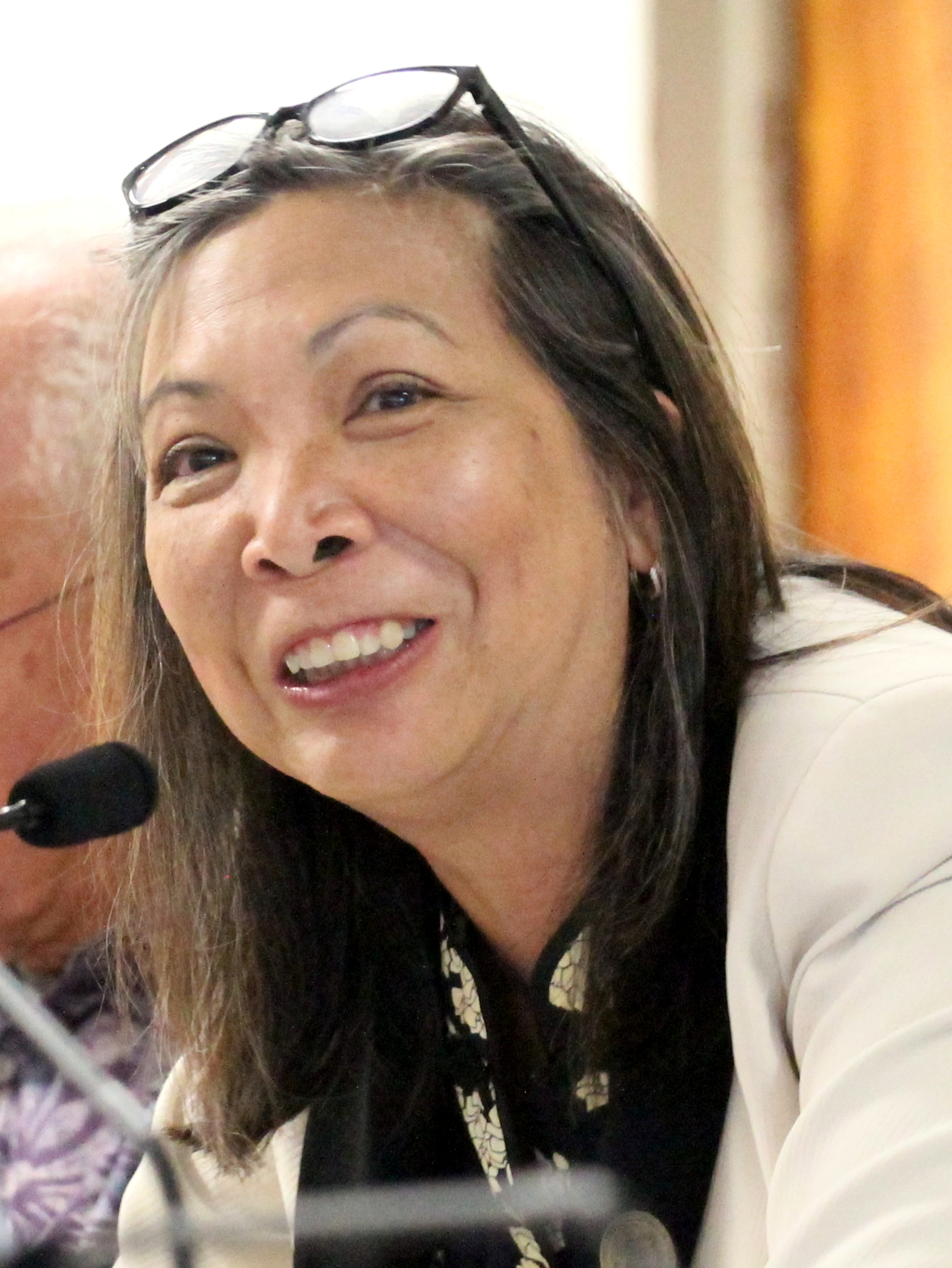

Nominee	Joy San Buenaventura	Fred Fogel
Party	Democratic	Libertarian
Incumbent Senator
Joy San Buenaventura
Democratic

Incumbent Democrat Joy San Buenaventura was re-elected in 2022 with 69.74% of the vote. She is running for re-election.

==== Democratic primary ====
===== Nominee =====
- Joy San Buenaventura, incumbent senator

===== Defeated =====
- Tanya Yamanaka Aynessazian

==== Third-party and independent candidates ====
===== Filed =====
- Fred Fogel, nominee for this district in 2016 and 2022, nominee for the 5th state house district in 2024, nominee for the 3rd state house district in 2010, 2012, 2014, and 2018, Democratic candidate for the 3rd state house district in 2020 (Libertarian)

=== District 5 ===
District 5 election
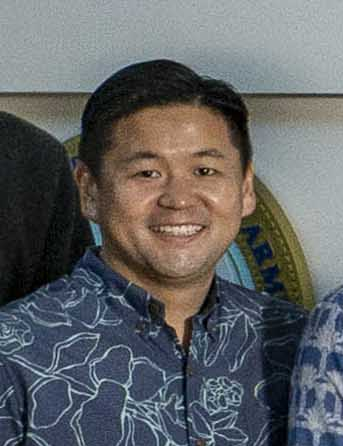
Nominee	Troy Hashimoto
Party	Democratic
Incumbent Senator
Troy Hashimoto
Democratic

Incumbent Democrat Troy Hashimoto was elected in a 2024 special election unopposed. He is unopposed in the primary and general elections.

==== Democratic primary ====
===== Nominee =====
- Troy Hashimoto, incumbent senator

=== District 8 ===
District 8 election
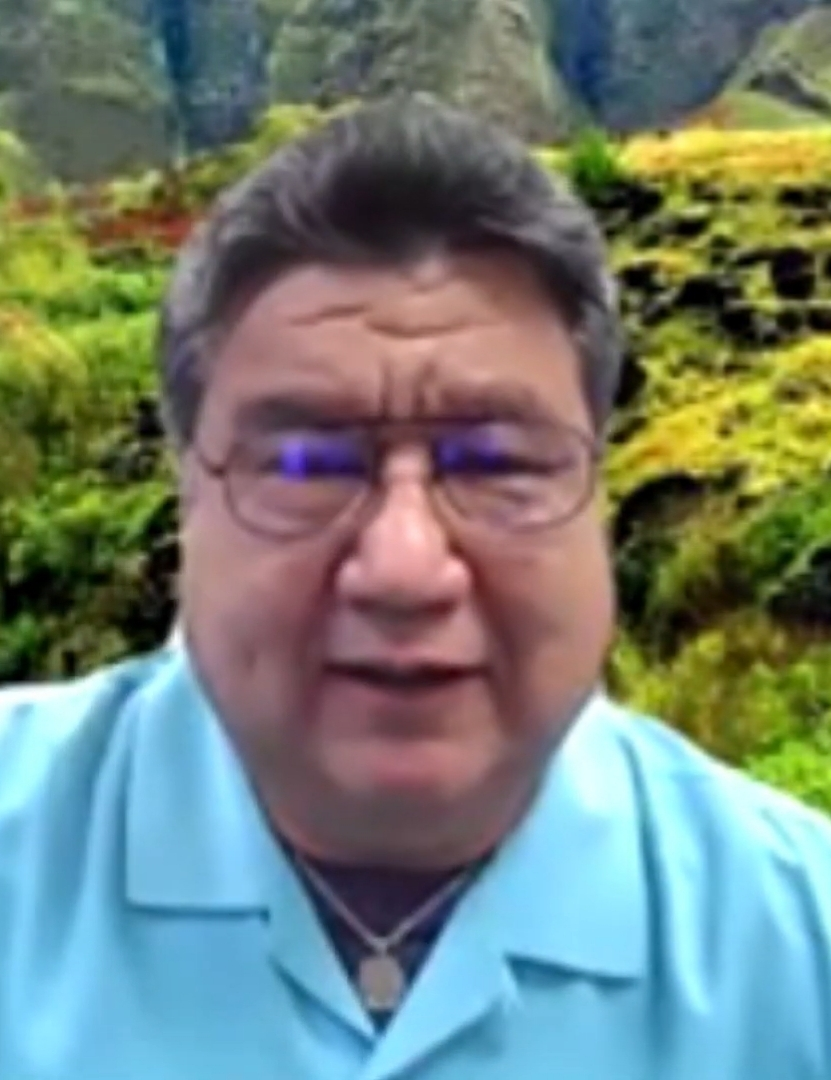
Nominee	Ron Kouchi
Party	Democratic
Incumbent Senator
Ron Kouchi
Democratic

Incumbent Democrat Ron Kouchi was re-elected in 2022 with 71.41% of the vote. Although previously signaling he would retire, Kouchi instead announced he would run for re-election. He is unopposed in the primary and general elections.

==== Democratic primary ====
===== Nominee =====
- Ron Kouchi, incumbent senator (2010–present)

===== Declined =====
- Derek Kawakami, mayor of Kauaʻi County (2018–present) (running for lieutenant governor)

=== District 9 ===
District 9 election
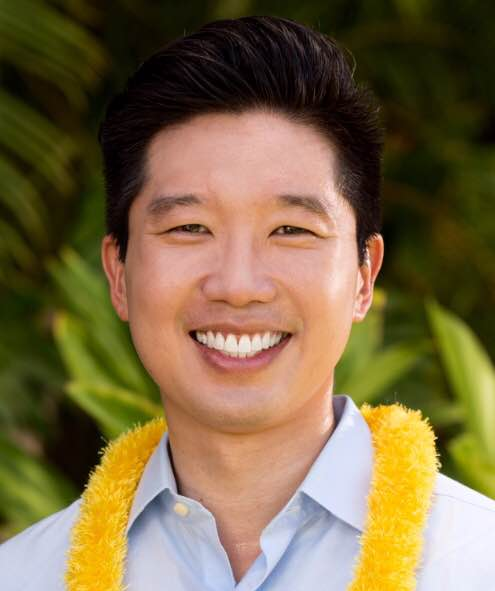

Nominee	Stanley Chang	David A. Croswell
Party	Democratic	Republican
Incumbent Senator
Stanley Chang
Democratic

Incumbent Democrat Stanley Chang was re-elected in 2022 with 70.27% of the vote. He faces Republican David A. Croswell in the general election.

==== Democratic primary ====
===== Nominee =====
- Stanley Chang, incumbent senator

==== Republican primary ====
===== Nominee =====
- David A. Croswell

=== District 10 ===
District 10 election
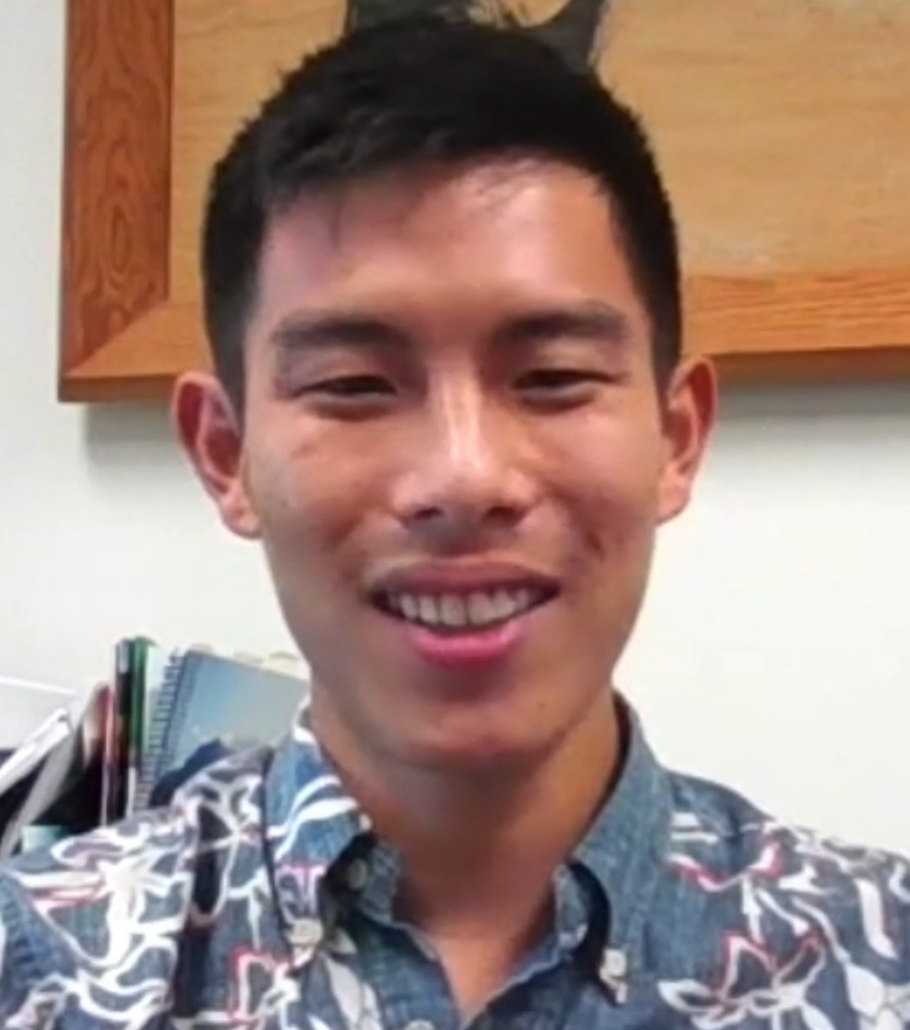
Nominee	Jackson Sayama
Party	Democratic
Senator before election
Les Ihara Jr.
Democratic
Elected Senator
TBD

Incumbent Democrat Les Ihara Jr. was re-elected in 2022 with 66.98% of the vote. He was defeated for re-nomination by state representative Jackson Sayama, who is unopposed in the general election.

==== Democratic primary ====
===== Nominee =====
- Jackson Sayama, state representative (2020–present) from the 21st district (2022–present) and the 20th district (2020–2022)

===== Eliminated =====
- Les Ihara Jr., incumbent senator

=== District 11 ===
District 11 election
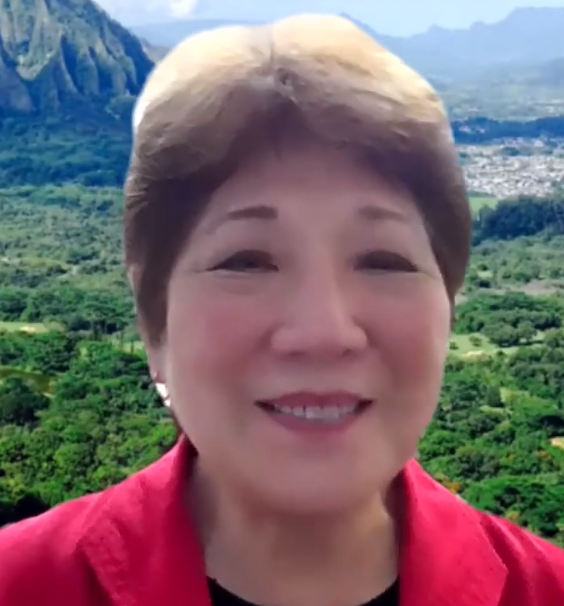
Nominee	Carol Fukunaga
Party	Democratic
Incumbent Senator
Carol Fukunaga
Democratic

Incumbent Democrat Carol Fukunaga was elected in 2022 with 75.31% of the vote. She is unopposed in the primary and general elections.

==== Democratic primary ====
===== Nominee =====
- Carol Fukunaga, incumbent senator

=== District 13 ===
District 13 election
Nominee	Tricia Kwai Lin Nakamatsu	Wallyn Kanoelani Christian
Party	Democratic	Republican
Incumbent Senator
Karl Rhoads
Democratic

Incumbent Democrat Karl Rhoads was re-elected in 2022 with 64.36% of the vote. He is retiring.

==== Democratic primary ====
===== Nominee =====
- Tricia Kwai Lin Nakamatsu, deputy attorney general

===== Eliminated =====
- Lei Ahu Isa, former at-large member of the Office of Hawaiian Affairs (2014–2022) and former state representative (1996–2002)
- Jordan K. Nakamura
- James Logue
- Lynn Vasquez, nominee for the 27th state house district in 2010

===== Declined =====
- Karl Rhoads, incumbent senator

==== Republican primary ====
===== Nominee =====
- Wallyn Kanoelani Christian, candidate for the 27th state house district in 2024, candidate for U.S. Senate in 2022

=== District 14 ===
District 14 election
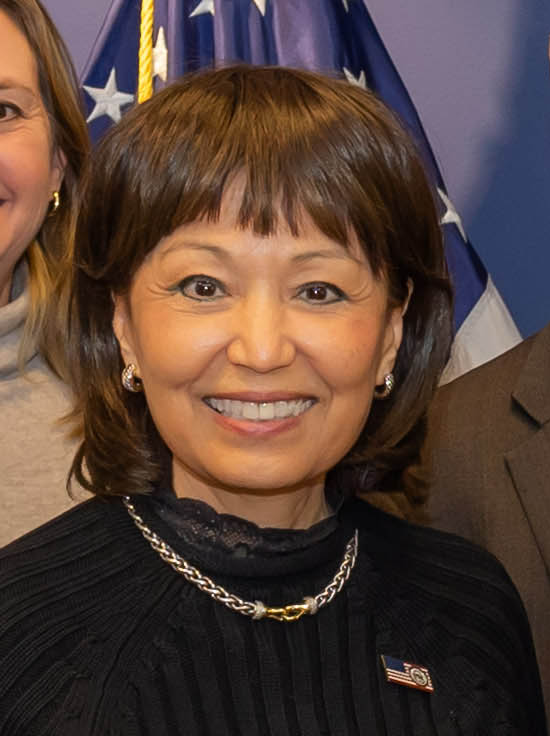
Nominee	Donna Mercado Kim
Party	Democratic
Incumbent Senator
Donna Mercado Kim
Democratic

Incumbent Democrat Donna Mercado Kim was re-elected in 2022 with 73.57% of the vote. She is running for re-election.

==== Democratic primary ====
===== Nominee =====
- Donna Mercado Kim, incumbent senator

===== Eliminated =====
- Christy Kikue MacPherson

=== District 15 ===
District 15 election
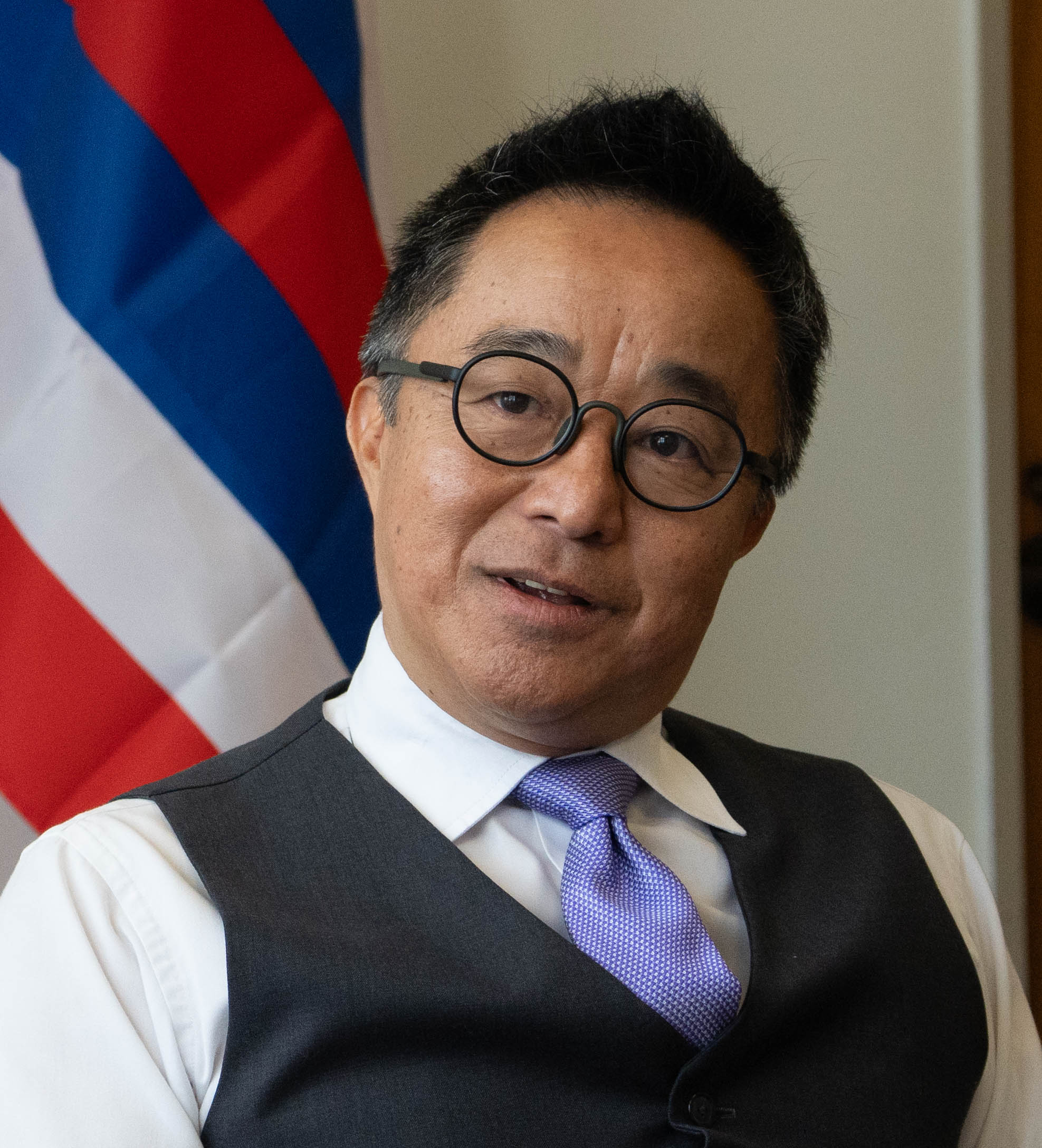
Nominee	Glenn Wakai
Party	Democratic
Incumbent Senator
Glenn Wakai
Democratic

Incumbent Democrat Glenn Wakai was re-elected in 2022 with 67.69% of the vote. He is unopposed in the primary and general elections.

==== Democratic primary ====
===== Nominee =====
- Glenn Wakai, incumbent senator

=== District 17 ===
District 17 election
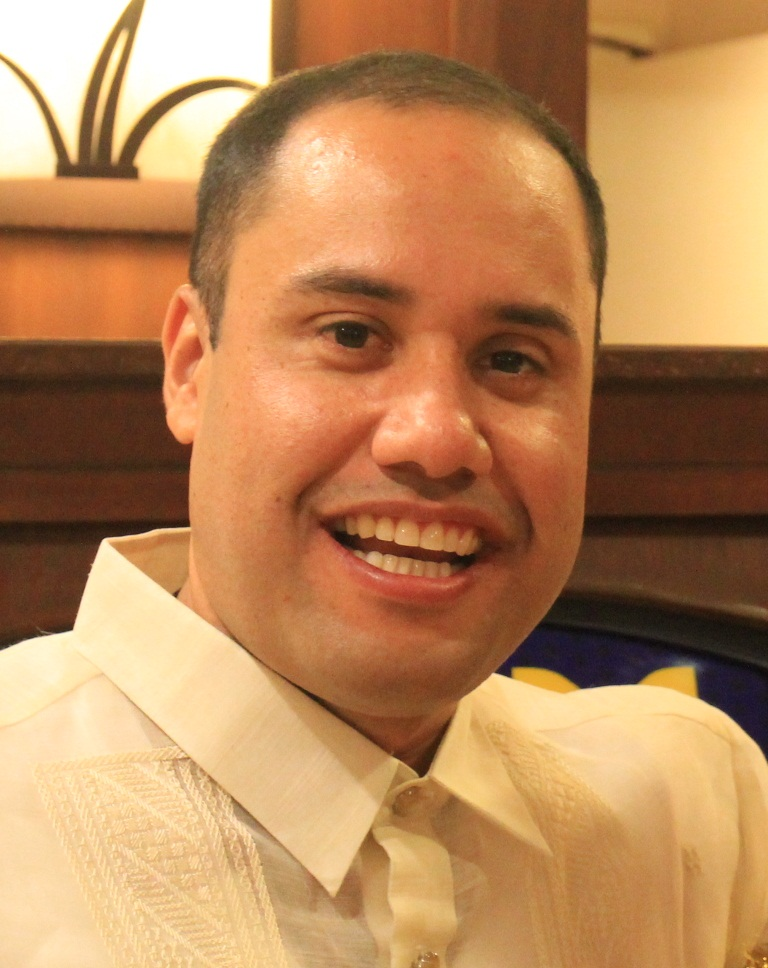
Nominee	Donovan Dela Cruz
Party	Democratic
Incumbent Senator
Donovan Dela Cruz
Democratic

Incumbent Democrat Donovan Dela Cruz was re-elected in 2022 with 65.20% of the vote. He defeated Nani H. Brown in the primary election and is unopposed in the general election.

==== Democratic primary ====
===== Nominee =====
- Donovan Dela Cruz, incumbent senator

===== Eliminated =====
- Nani H. Brown

=== District 18 (special) ===
District 18 special election
Nominee	Danielle Bass	Kelly Kitashima
Party	Democratic	Republican
Incumbent Senator
Danielle Bass
Democratic

Incumbent Democrat Danielle Bass was appointed effective August 2026 after Michelle Kidani, who was re-elected in 2024 with 61.7% of the vote, resigned in June 2026. A special election to fill the remainder of her term will be held concurrent with regularly scheduled general election on November 3.

==== Democratic primary ====
===== Nominee =====
- Danielle Bass, appointed senator

===== Applied to be appointed =====
- Beth Fukumoto, former Republican state representative
- Sechyi Laiu, attorney

==== Republican primary ====
===== Nominee =====
- Kelly Kitashima, hotel manager and candidate for Hawaii Senate in 2020 and the Honolulu City Council in 2018

===== Declined =====
- Lauren Cheape Matsumoto, state representative from the 39th district (2022–present)

=== District 19 (special) ===
District 19 special election
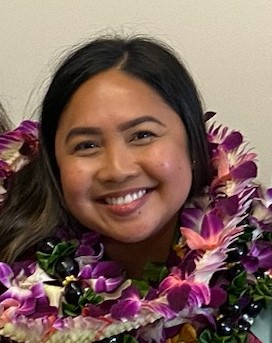

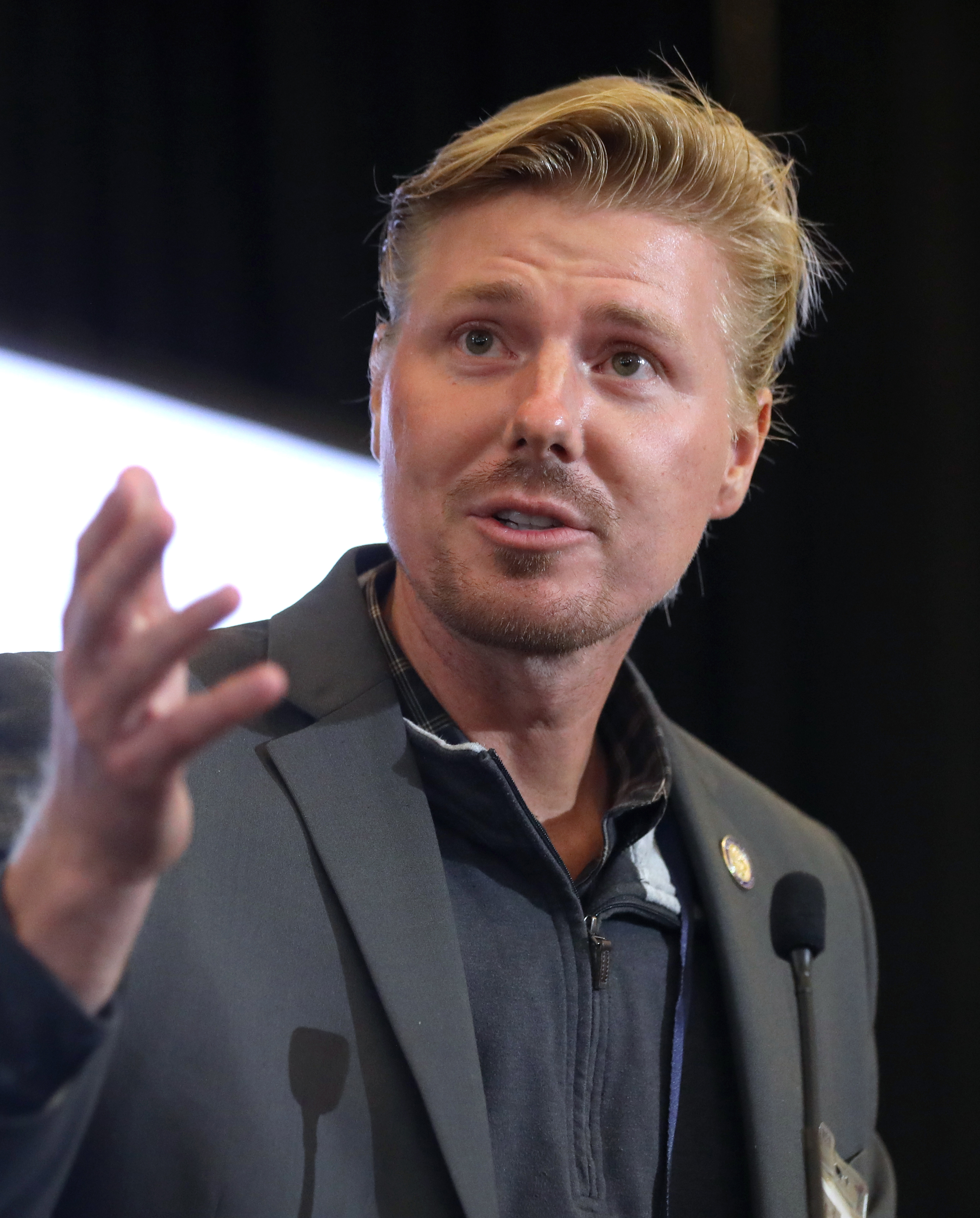
Nominee	Rachele Lamosao	Elijah Pierick
Party	Democratic	Republican
Incumbent Senator
Rachele Lamosao
Democratic

Incumbent Democrat Rachele Lamosao was appointed effective January 2026 after Henry Aquino, who was re-elected in 2024 unopposed, resigned in November 2025. A special election to fill the remaining two years of his term will be held concurrent with regularly scheduled primary elections on August 8.

==== Democratic primary ====
===== Nominee =====
- Rachele Lamosao, incumbent senator

===== Eliminated =====
- Inam Rahman

==== Republican primary ====
===== Nominee =====
- Elijah Pierick, state representative from the 39th district (2022–present)

=== District 20 ===
District 20 election
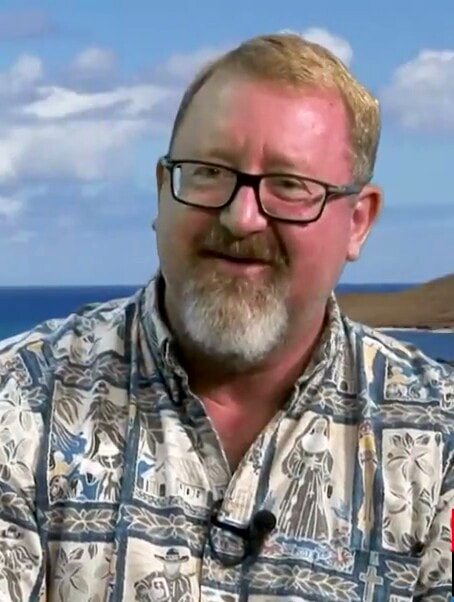

Nominee	Bob McDermott	Markus Owens
Party	Republican	Democratic
Incumbent Senator
Kurt Fevella
Republican

Incumbent Republican Kurt Fevella was re-elected in 2022 unopposed. In the 2026 primary, Bob McDermott was selected as the Republican nominee following a tie breaking drawing. Fevella challenged the results, which the Hawaii Supreme Court then rejected because the challenge was filed after an August 24 deadline.

==== Republican primary ====
Nominee

- Bob McDermott, former state representative (1996–2002, 2012–2022), nominee for U.S. Senate in 2022 and 2024

===== Eliminated =====
- Rida Cabanilla Arakawa, former Democratic state representative (2004–2014, 2018–2020)
- Kurt Fevella, incumbent senator

==== Democratic primary ====
===== Nominee =====
- Markus Owens, realtor

=== District 21 ===
District 21 election
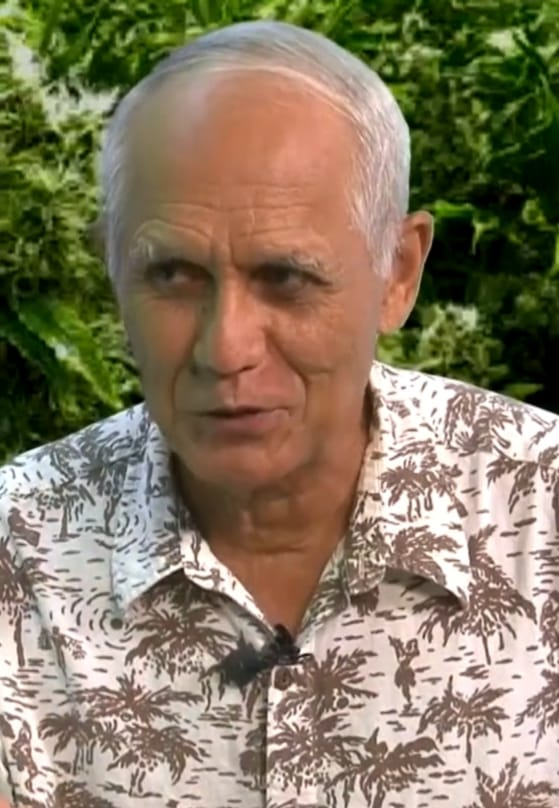
Nominee	Mike Gabbard
Party	Democratic
Incumbent Senator
Mike Gabbard
Democratic

Incumbent Democrat Mike Gabbard was re-elected in 2022 with 58.89% of the vote. He is unopposed in the primary and general elections.

==== Democratic primary ====
===== Nominee =====
- Mike Gabbard, incumbent senator

=== District 25 ===
District 25 election
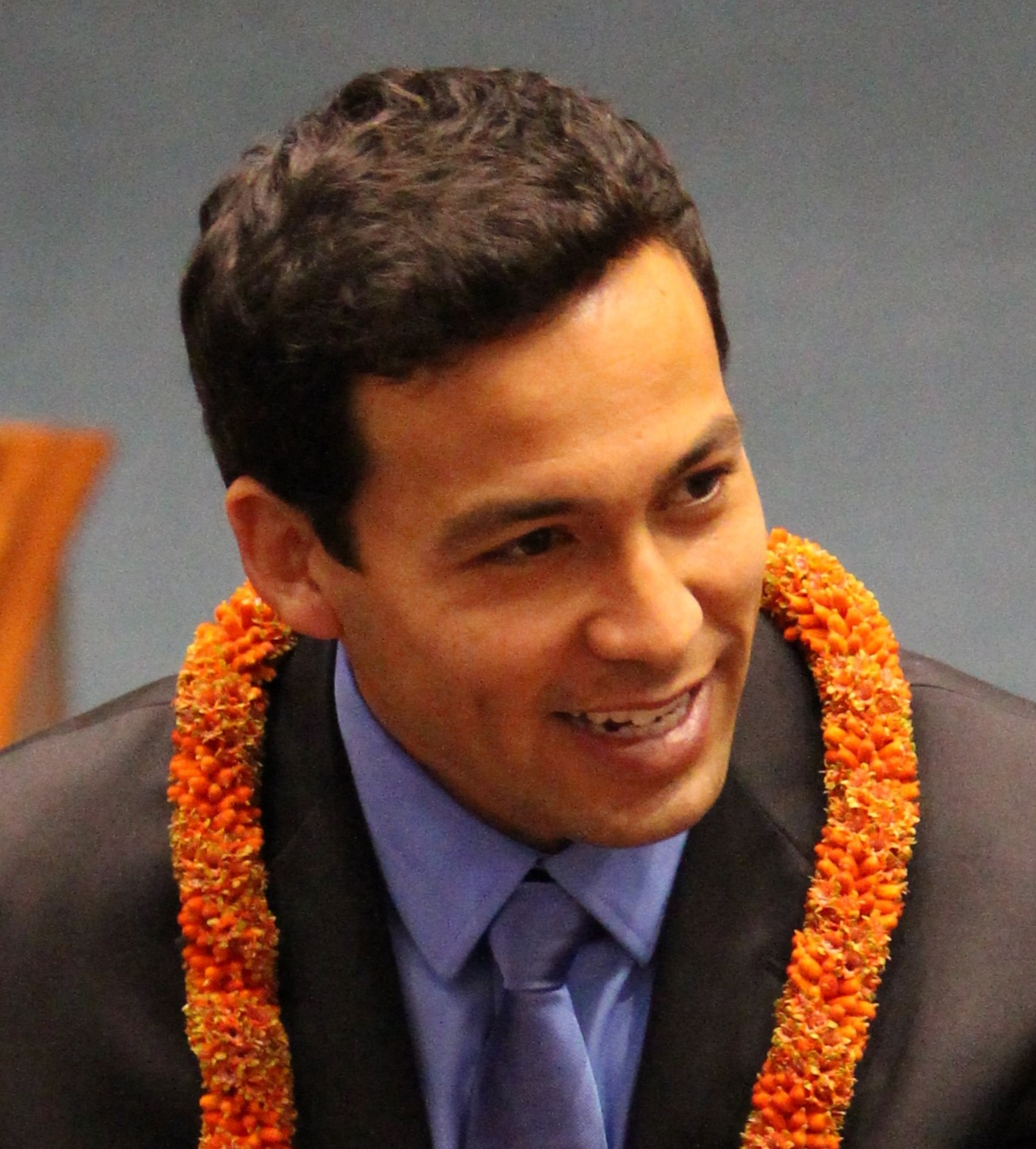
Nominee	Chris Lee
Party	Democratic
Incumbent Senator
Chris Lee
Democratic

Incumbent Democrat Chris Lee was re-elected in 2022 with 70.30% of the vote. He defeated Bobby Silva in the Democratic primary election and is unopposed in the general election.

==== Democratic primary ====
===== Nominee =====
- Chris Lee, incumbent senator

===== Eliminated =====
- Bobby Silva

== See also ==
- Elections in Hawaii
- List of Hawaii state legislatures
