= 29th Hawaii State Legislature =

Term of state legislature in Hawaii, US

30th	→
- The Great Seal of the State of Hawaii

Overview
- Legislative body: Hawaii State Legislature
- Jurisdiction: Hawaii
- Term: November 10, 2016 – November 6, 2018

Senate
- Members: 25
- President: Ron Kouchi (D)
- Vice President: Michelle Kidani (D)
- Majority Leader: J. Kalani English
- Party control: Democratic

House of Representatives
- Members: 51
- Speaker: Joseph M. Souki (D) until May 4, 2017; Scott Saiki (D) from May 4, 2017
- Vice Speaker: John Mizuno (D)
- Minority Leader: Beth Fukumoto (R) until February 2, 2017; Andria Tupola (R), from February 2, 2017
- Party control: Democratic

Sessions
- 1st: January 18, 2017 – May 4, 2017

The Twenty Ninth Hawaii State Legislature, consisting of the Hawaii House of Representatives and the Hawaii Senate, was constituted in the U.S. state of Hawaii from November 10, 2016, to November 6, 2018, during the final two years of David Ige's first term as governor. The 2016 elections gave the Democrats an even larger majority in both legislative bodies, with the losses of one Republican representative and lone Republican senator Sam Slom.

On March 22, 2017, former House Minority Leader Beth Fukumoto announced she would leave the Republican Party and seek membership in the Democratic Party. This lowered Republican membership in the Hawaii House of Representatives to 5 against 45 Democrats.

== Major events ==
- January 18, 2017: Opening Day of the 2017 Legislative Session
- February 2, 2017: House Minority Leader Beth Fukumoto was ousted over her criticisms of President Donald Trump. She was replaced by Minority Floor Leader Andria Tupola of Nanakuli.
- March 22, 2017: Republican Representative and former House Minority Leader Beth Fukumoto announced her resignation from the Republican Party and her intention to seek membership with the Democratic Party.
- May 3, 2017: A bill to fund Honolulu's rail transit system failed when the Senate and House of Representatives could not reach an agreement after 11 hours. Governor David Ige announced he would not extend the legislative session unless the two houses came to a consensus despite the requests of all four Hawaii mayors.
- May 4, 2017: Senator Jill Tokuda was removed from the Senate Ways and Means Committee for her role in killing the rail funding bill. House Speaker Joseph M. Souki resigned from his post and was replaced by House Majority Leader Scott Saiki. This was also the final day of the 2017 Legislative Session.

== Major Legislation ==
=== Proposed ===
- May 2, 2017: SB562: Requires the Attorney General to defend any civil action against the county based on negligence, wrongful act, or omission of a county lifeguard for services at a designated state beach park.
- May 3, 2017: HB100: State Budget for fiscal years 2018-2019
- May 3, 2017: HB115: Requires all counties with populations over 500,000 to take ownership and jurisdiction over all "disputed roads" under certain circumstances
- May 3, 2017: HB335: Office of Hawaiian Affairs budget for fiscal years 2018–2019.
- May 3, 2017: HB451: Reduces the minimum Hawaiian blood quantum requirement of certain successors to lessees of Hawaiian home lands from one-quarter to one thirty-second.
- May 3, 2017: HB1098: Requires emergency shelters to have partitioned space for homeless persons or families.

== Party Summary ==
=== Senate ===
Affiliation	Party (Shading indicates majority caucus)		Total	
Affiliation	Democratic	Republican	Total	Vacant
End of previous legislature (2016)	24	1	25	0
Begin (2017)	25	0	25	0
Latest voting share	100%	0%		

=== House of Representatives ===
Affiliation	Party (Shading indicates majority caucus)			Total	
Affiliation	Democratic	Republican	Ind.	Total	Vacant
End of previous legislature (2016)	44	7	0	51	0
Begin (2017)	45	6	0	51	0
March 22, 2017	45	5	1	51	0
Latest voting share	88.2%	9.8%	2%		

== Leadership ==
=== Senate ===
- President: Ron Kouchi (D)
- Vice President: Michelle Kidani (D)

==== Majority (Democratic) Leadership ====
- Majority Leader: J. Kalani English
- Majority Caucus Leader: Brickwood Galuteria
- Majority Floor Leader: Will Espero
- Majority Whip: Donovan Dela Cruz
- Assistant Majority Whip: Brian Taniguchi

=== House of Representatives ===
- Speaker: Joseph M. Souki (D), until May 4, 2017
  - Scott Saiki (D), from May 4, 2017
- Speaker Emeritus: Calvin Say (D)
- Speaker Emeritus: Joseph M. Souki (D), from May 4, 2017
- Vice Speaker: John Mizuno (D)

==== Majority (Democratic) Leadership ====
- Majority Leader: Scott Saiki, until May 4, 2017
- Majority Floor Leader: Cindy Evans
- Majority Policy Leader: Marcus Oshiro
- Majority Whip: Kent Ito
- Assistant Majority Leaders: Chris Lee, Dee Morikawa, and Roy Takumi

==== Minority (Republican) Leadership ====
- Minority Leader: Beth Fukumoto, until February 2, 2017
  - Andria Tupola, from February 2, 2017
- Minority Leader Emeritus: Gene Ward
- Assistant Minority Leader: Bob McDermott
- Minority Floor Leader: Andria Tupola, until February 2, 2017
  - Gene Ward, from February 2, 2017
- Assistant Minority Floor Leader: Cynthia Thielen
- Minority Whip: Lauren Matsumoto

== Members ==
=== Senate ===
==== Hawaii ====
- Kaiali‘i Kahele (D-1)
- Russell Ruderman (D-2)
- Josh Green (D-3)
- Lorraine Inouye (D-4)
- Rosalyn Baker (D-6)

==== Maui, Molokai, and Lanai ====
- Gilbert Keith-Agaran (D-5)
- J. Kalani English (D-7)

==== Kauai and Niihau ====
- Ron Kouchi (D-8)

==== Oahu ====
- Stanley Chang (D-9)
- Les Ihara, Jr. (D-10)
- Brian Taniguchi (D-11)
- Brickwood Galuteria (D-12)
- Karl Rhoads (D-13)
- Donna Mercado Kim (D-14)
- Glenn Wakai (D-15)
- Breene Harimoto (D-16)
- Clarence K. Nishihara (D-17)
- Michelle Kidani (D-18)
- Will Espero (D-19)
- Mike Gabbard (D-20)
- Maile Shimabukuro (D-4)
- Donovan Dela Cruz (D-22)
- Gil Riviere (D-23)
- Jill Tokuda (D-24)
- Laura Thielen (D-25)
