= 2020 Hawaii Senate election =

- November 3, 2020

14 of the 25 seats in the Hawaii Senate 13 seats needed for a majority
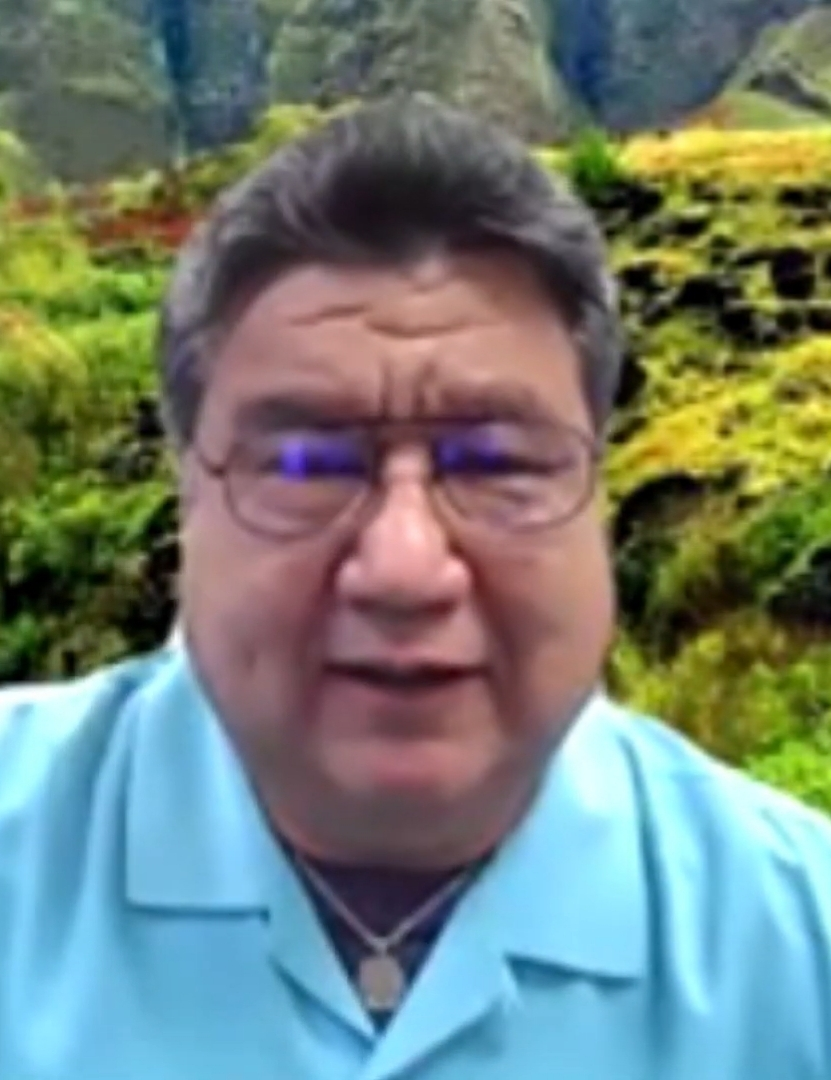

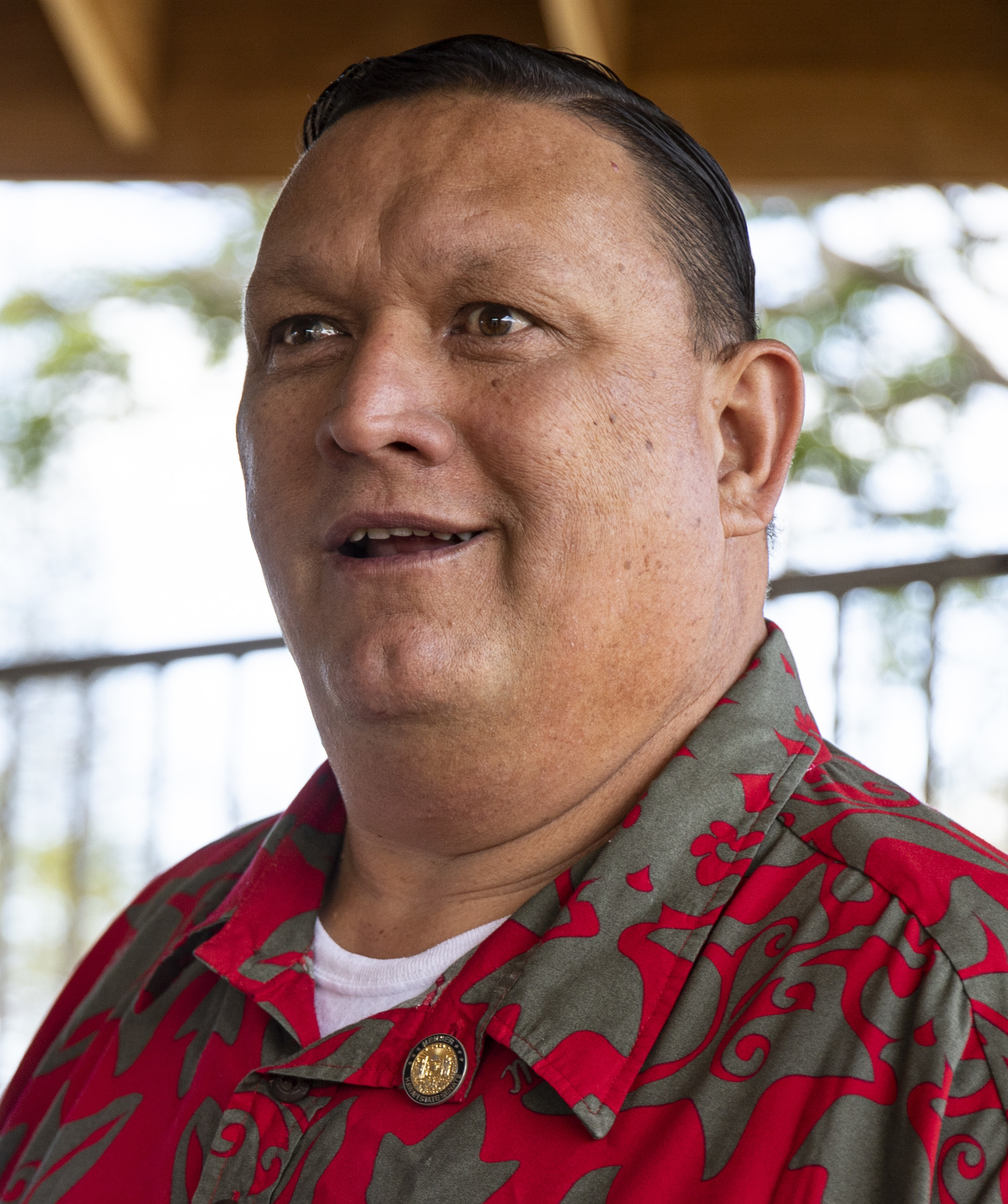
	Majority party	Minority party
Leader	Ron Kouchi	Kurt Fevella
Party	Democratic	Republican
Leader's seat	8th	19th
Seats before	24	1
Seats after	24	1
Seat change	Steady	Steady
Popular vote	112,858	56,447
Percentage	62.3	31.2
- Results: Democratic hold Republican hold No election
President before election
Ron Kouchi
Democratic
Elected President
Ron Kouchi
Democratic

The 2020 Hawaii Senate elections took place as part of the biennial 2020 United States elections. Hawaii voters elected state senators in 13 of the state's 25 senate districts. The primary elections on August 8, 2020, determined which candidates would appear on the November 3, 2020 general election ballot.

Following the previous election in 2018, Democrats had control of the Hawaii Senate with 24 seats to Republicans' one seat.

== Predictions ==
Source	Ranking	As of
The Cook Political Report	Safe D	October 21, 2020

== Composition ==
Affiliation	Party (Shading indicates majority caucus)		Total
Affiliation	Democratic	Republican	Total
Before election	24	1	25
Not up	11	0	11
Up	13	1	14
Results	13	1	14
After election	24	1	25
Change	Steady	Steady	

== Summary ==
Summary of the November 3, 2020 Hawaii Senate election results
Party	Candidates	Vote	%	Seats				
Party	Candidates	Vote	%	Before	Up	Won	After	+/–
Democratic	14	112,858	62.28	24	13	13	24	Steady
Republican	6	56,447	31.15	1	1	1	1	Steady
Libertarian	1	6,172	3.41	0	0	0	0	Steady
Aloha ʻĀina	2	5,722	3.16	0	0	0	0	Steady
Total		181,199	100%	25	14	14	25	Steady
Source: State of Hawaii Office of Elections

Popular vote
Democratic	62.28%
Republican	31.15%
Libertarian	3.41%
Aloha ʻĀina	3.16%

Senate seats (up for election)
Democratic	92.86%
Republican	7.14%

Senate seats (in total)
Democratic	96%
Republican	4%

District	Incumbent	Party	Elected Senator	Party
2nd	Russell Ruderman	Dem	Joy San Buenaventura	Dem
5th	Gilbert Keith-Agaran	Dem	Gilbert Keith-Agaran	Dem
8th	Ron Kouchi	Dem	Ron Kouchi (Note: Without opposition, the general election was canceled and the incumbent was automatically reelected.)	Dem
9th	Stanley Chang	Dem	Stanley Chang	Dem
10th	Les Ihara Jr.	Dem	Les Ihara Jr.	Dem
11th	Brian Taniguchi	Dem	Brian Taniguchi	Dem
13th	Karl Rhoads	Dem	Karl Rhoads	Dem
14th	Donna Mercado Kim	Dem	Donna Mercado Kim	Dem
15th	Glenn Wakai	Dem	Glenn Wakai	Dem
16th* (Note: Special election called due to the death of Sen. Breene Harimoto. Misalucha was the appointed incumbent.)	Bennette Misalucha	Dem	Bennette Misalucha	Dem
19th	Kurt Fevella	Rep	Kurt Fevella	Rep
20th	Mike Gabbard	Dem	Mike Gabbard	Dem
22nd	Donovan Dela Cruz	Dem	Donovan Dela Cruz	Dem
25th	Laura Thielen	Dem	Chris Lee	Dem

== Retiring incumbents ==
Two incumbent senators (both Democrats) did not seek reelection in 2020.

1. District 2: Russell Ruderman (D)
2. District 25: Laura Thielen (D)

== Detailed results ==
Source for primary results: Source for general election results:

=== District 2 ===
Democratic primary

Hawaii's 2nd Senate District Democratic primary, 2020
Party	Candidate	Votes	%
Democratic	Joy San Buenaventura	8,072	78.3
Democratic	Smiley Burrows	2,235	21.7
Total votes		10,307	100.0

General election

Hawaii's 2nd Senate District general election, 2020
Party	Candidate	Votes	%
Democratic	Joy San Buenaventura	14,225	75.2
Aloha ʻĀina Party	Ron Ka-Ipo	4,694	24.8
Total votes		18,919	100.0
Democratic hold			

=== District 5 ===
Hawaii's 5th Senate District general election, 2020
Party	Candidate	Votes	%
Democratic	Gilbert Keith-Agaran (incumbent)	13,891	64.3
Republican	Christy Gusman	6,683	31.9
Aloha ʻĀina Party	Rynette Keen	1,028	4.8
Total votes		21,602	100.0
Democratic hold			

=== District 8 ===
Incumbent Democrat and Senate President Ron Kouchi was automatically reelected without opposition, with no votes recorded.

=== District 9 ===
Hawaii's 9th Senate District general election, 2020
Party	Candidate	Votes	%
Democratic	Stanley Chang (incumbent)	19,109	61.9
Republican	Sam Slom	11,762	38.1
Total votes		30,871	100.0
Democratic hold			

=== District 10 ===
Democratic primary

Hawaii's 10th Senate District Democratic primary, 2020
Party	Candidate	Votes	%
Democratic	Les Ihara Jr. (incumbent)	8,340	68.2
Democratic	Vicki Higgins	2,576	21.1
Democratic	Jesus Arriola	1,306	10.7
Total votes		12,222	100.0

General election
Incumbent Democrat Les Ihara Jr. was automatically reelected without opposition, with no votes recorded.

=== District 11 ===
Incumbent Democrat Brian Taniguchi was automatically reelected without opposition, with no votes recorded.

=== District 13 ===
Hawaii's 13th Senate District Democratic primary, 2020
Party	Candidate	Votes	%
Democratic	Karl Rhoads (incumbent)	8,264	86.4
Democratic	Kevin "Shadow" McDonald	1,302	13.6
Total votes		9,566	100.0

General election
Incumbent Democrat Karl Rhoads was automatically reelected without opposition, with no votes recorded.

=== District 14 ===
Incumbent Democrat Donna Mercado Kim was automatically reelected without opposition, with no votes recorded.

=== District 15 ===
Incumbent Democrat Glenn Wakai was automatically reelected without opposition, with no votes recorded.

=== District 16 (special) ===
Hawaii's 16th Senate District special general election, 2020
Party	Candidate	Votes	%
Democratic	Bennette Misalucha (incumbent)	11,508	52.7
Republican	Kelly Kitashima	10,335	47.3
Total votes		21,843	100.0
Democratic hold			

=== District 19 ===
Democratic primary

Hawaii's 19th Senate District Democratic primary, 2020
Party	Candidate	Votes	%
Democratic	Rida Cabanilla	4,553	63.0
Democratic	John Clark III	2,677	37.0
Total votes		7,230	100.0

General election

Hawaii's 19th Senate District general election, 2020
Party	Candidate	Votes	%
Republican	Kurt Fevella (incumbent)	12,345	58.3
Democratic	Rida Cabanilla	8,813	41.7
Total votes		21,158	100.0
Republican hold			

=== District 20 ===
Hawaii's 20th Senate District general election, 2020
Party	Candidate	Votes	%
Democratic	Mike Gabbard (incumbent)	13,967	69.4
Libertarian	Feena Bonoan	6,172	30.6
Total votes		20,139	100.0
Democratic hold			

=== District 22 ===
Democratic primary

Hawaii's 22nd Senate District Democratic primary, 2020
Party	Candidate	Votes	%
Democratic	Donovan Dela Cruz (incumbent)	8,533	85.6
Democratic	Thora-Jean Cuaresma	1,439	14.4
Total votes		9,972	100.0

General election

Hawaii's 22nd Senate District general election, 2020
Party	Candidate	Votes	%
Democratic	Donovan Dela Cruz (incumbent)	13,612	70.3
Republican	John Miller	5,755	29.7
Total votes		19,367	100.0
Democratic hold			

=== District 25 ===
Hawaii's 25th Senate District general election, 2020
Party	Candidate	Votes	%
Democratic	Chris Lee	17,733	65.0
Republican	Kristina Kim-Marshall	9,567	35.0
Total votes		27,300	100.0
Democratic hold			

== See also ==
- 2020 Hawaii elections
- 2020 United States elections
- Hawaii Senate
- Elections in Hawaii
