= Senator Kim (disambiguation) =

Andy Kim (born 1982) is a U.S. Senator from New Jersey since 2024.

Senator Kim may also refer to:

- Donna Mercado Kim (born 1952/53), Hawaii State Senate
- Patty Kim (politician) (born 1973), Pennsylvania State Senate
