= Senator Chang =

Senator Chang may refer to:

- Ling Ling Chang (born 1976), California State Senate
- Stanley Chang (fl. 2010s), Hawaii State Senate
- Stephanie Chang (fl. 2000s–2010s), Michigan State Senate

== See also ==
- Sonia Chang-Díaz (born 1978), Massachusetts State Senate
