= Norman Mizuguchi =

American politician (born 1939)

9th President of the Hawaii Senate
- In office 1994–2000
- Preceded by: James Aki
- Succeeded by: Robert Bunda

Member of the Hawaii Senate
- In office 1978–2000
- Succeeded by: Donna Mercado Kim

Personal details
- Born: May 26, 1939 (age 87) Hilo, Hawaii, U.S.
- Party: Democratic

Norman Keiji Mizuguchi (born May 26, 1939) is an American former politician. He served as a member of the Hawaii Senate.

== Life and career ==
Mizuguchi was born in Hilo, Hawaii. He earned a bachelor's degree from Springfield College, a master's degree from Michigan State University and PhD from the University of Utah. A Democrat, Mizuguchi served in the Hawaii Senate from 1978 to 2000 and in the Hawaii House of Representatives from 1975 to 1978. He was President of the Hawaii Senate from 1994 to 2000.

On June 6, 2000, he announced his retirement from the Senate.
