= Caroline Sinavaiana-Gabbard =

American Samoan writer (1946–2024)

- Born: Caroline Gabbard; 1946; Utulei, American Samoa
- Died: 26 May 2024 (aged 78); Vaivase-uta, Samoa
- Occupations: Academic; writer
- Relatives: Mike Gabbard (brother); Tulsi Gabbard (niece)
- Writing career
- Genre: Poetry

Caroline Sinavaiana-Gabbard (1946 – 26 May 2024) was an American Samoan academic, writer, poet, and environmentalist. She was the first Samoan to become a full professor in the United States.

== Biography ==
Sinavaiana-Gabbard was born in Utulei village, Tutuila, American Samoa, in 1946. She was educated at Sonoma State University, University of California, Berkeley, and the University of Hawai'i. Her PhD thesis was on Traditional Comic Theater in Samoa: A Holographic View. She taught creative writing as a faculty of the Department of English, University of Hawai'i at Mānoa, from 1997 until her retirement in 2016. In 2002 she published her collection of poetry, Alchemies of Distance.

In August 2020 she was named by USA Today on its list of influential women from U.S. territories.

== Assassination ==
Sinavaiana-Gabbard moved to Samoa after she retired. She was murdered at the GaluMoana Theater in Vaivase-uta, on 26 May 2024, at the age of 78. Playwright Sia Figiel was charged with her murder.

She was the sister to American politician Mike Gabbard and thus the paternal aunt of American politician Tulsi Gabbard.
