= Tricia Nakamatsu =

American politician

- Nakamatsu in 2021

Member of the Hawaii Senate from the 13th district
- Incumbent
- Assumed office November 3, 2026
- Preceded by: Karl Rhoads

Personal details
- Born: 1979 or 1980 (age 46–47) Oahu, Hawaii, U.S.
- Party: Democratic
- Education: Claremont McKenna College; William S. Richardson School of Law (JD)
- Website: Campaign website

Tricia Mayumi Kwai Lin Nakamatsu (born 1979 or 1980) is an American lawyer and politician. She is a member of the Hawaii Senate from the 13th district, having been elected in 2026. A Democrat, Nakamatsu has worked as a deputy Hawaii Attorney General.

== Early life and career ==
Born and raised on Oahu, Hawaii, Nakamatsu is of Chinese, Japanese and Okinawan heritage. Her father was an insurance broker and former associate manager at Woolworth's in Waikiki. She graduated from Punahou School, followed by Claremont McKenna College and the William S. Richardson School of Law.

Nakamatsu has worked as a deputy Hawaii Attorney General, deputy corporation counsel, and deputy prosecuting attorney. As a deputy attorney general in January 2025, she advocated for harsher penalties for illegal fireworks usage.

== Hawaii Senate ==
In 2026, Nakamatsu ran for the 13th district of the Hawaii Senate to succeed retiring incumbent Karl Rhoads. She placed first in the Democratic primary election with 48% of the vote, ahead of Jordan Nakamura and Lei Ahu Isa as well as two other candidates. Nakamatsu then won the general election against Republican nominee Wallyn Kanoelani Christian.
