= Shan Tsutsui =

American politician

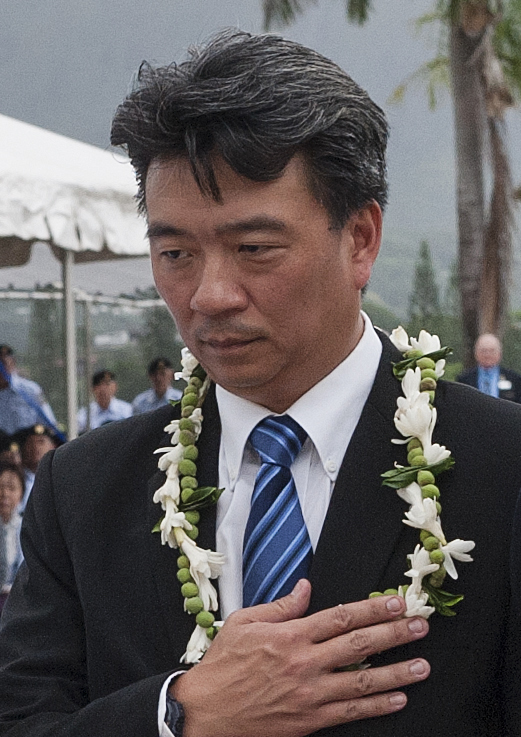
- Tsutsui in 2015

13th Lieutenant Governor of Hawaii
- In office December 27, 2012 – January 31, 2018
- Governor: Neil Abercrombie; David Ige
- Preceded by: Brian Schatz
- Succeeded by: Doug Chin

12th President of the Hawaii Senate
- In office November 6, 2010 – December 27, 2012
- Preceded by: Colleen Hanabusa
- Succeeded by: Donna Mercado Kim

Member of the Hawaii Senate from the 5th district 4th (2002–November 2012)
- In office 2002 – December 27, 2012
- Preceded by: Redistricted
- Succeeded by: Gilbert Keith-Agaran

Personal details
- Born: August 9, 1971 (age 54) Wailuku, Hawaii, U.S.
- Party: Democratic
- Spouse: Lyndelle Lee
- Education: University of Hawaii at Manoa (BA)

Shan Saichi Tsutsui (born August 9, 1971) is an American politician who was the 13th lieutenant governor of Hawaii from 2012 to 2018. A member of the Democratic Party, he was previously a member of the Hawaii Senate from 2003 to 2012, and he served as President of the Senate from 2010 to 2012. On January 29, 2018, Tsutsui announced his resignation, which was put into effect on January 31.

== Early life and education ==
Born in Wailuku, Tsutsui graduated from Maui High School in 1989 and received a B.A. in Economics from the University of Hawaiʻi at Mānoa in 1994.

== Senate ==
Tsutsui was a member of the Hawaii Senate from 2003 until becoming lieutenant governor in 2012. From 2003 to 2011, he represented district 4, which includes Waihee, Wailuku, and Kahului. Subsequently he represented district 5.

== Lieutenant governor ==
Following the death of U.S. Senator Daniel Inouye, Governor Neil Abercrombie appointed Lieutenant Governor Brian Schatz to replace Inouye in the U.S. Senate. As president of the Hawaii Senate, Tsutsui was first in line to replace Schatz as lieutenant governor. After consulting with his family, Senate leaders, and Governor Abercrombie, Tsutsui accepted the position. Tsutsui's successor in the Senate (who served until 2014) was selected by Governor Abercrombie from a list of three names submitted by the local Democratic Party central committee. Tsutsui's position as Senate president was filled by Senate vice president Donna Mercado Kim until Senate members voted on a new president on the opening day of the 2013 session.

Tsutsui was elected to a second term as lieutenant governor in 2014. Tsutsui had expected to share the ticket with Abercrombie in the general election, but Ige defeated Abercrombie in the primary. He announced in October 2017 that he would not run for a third term as lieutenant governor in 2018, even though he was eligible to do so because his first term was only the completion of an unexpired term.

Tsutsui resigned as lieutenant governor effective January 31, 2018, to take a job with Strategies 360, a communications firm.

== Personal life ==
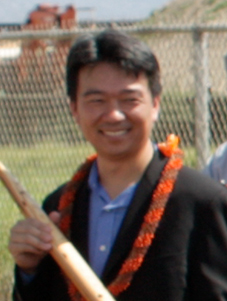
Tsutsui in 2011

Tsutsui and his wife Lyndelle have three daughters, Mikayla, Kaylee, and Kenna.

== Electoral history ==
Hawai'i State Senate District 4 Democratic Primary Election, 2002
| Party | Candidate | Votes | % |
| Democratic | Shan Tsutsui | 4,255 | 53.12 |
| Democratic | Jan Yagi Buen | 2,921 | 36.47 |
| Democratic | Thomas Cerizo | 834 | 10.41 |

Hawai'i State Senate District 4 Election, 2002
| Party | Candidate | Votes | % |
| Democratic | Shan Tsutsui | n/a | 100.00 |

Hawai'i State Senate District 4 Election, 2004
| Party | Candidate | Votes | % |
| Democratic | Shan Tsutsui (inc.) | n/a | 100.00 |

Hawai'i State Senate District 4 Democratic Primary Election, 2006
| Party | Candidate | Votes | % |
| Democratic | Shan Tsutsui (inc.) | 6,177 | 68.32 |
| Democratic | Jan Yagi Buen | 2,864 | 31.68 |

Hawai'i State Senate District 4 Election, 2006
| Party | Candidate | Votes | % |
| Democratic | Shan Tsutsui (inc.) | n/a | 100.00 |

Hawai'i State Senate District 4 Election, 2008
| Party | Candidate | Votes | % |
| Democratic | Shan Tsutsui (inc.) | n/a | 100.00 |

Hawai'i State Senate District 4 Election, 2010
| Party | Candidate | Votes | % |
| Democratic | Shan Tsutsui (inc.) | 10,931 | 77.83 |
| Republican | Eric Seibert | 3,113 | 22.17 |

Hawai'i State Senate District 5 Election, 2012
| Party | Candidate | Votes | % |
| Democratic | Shan Tsutsui (inc.) | n/a | 100.00 |

Hawai'i Lieutenant Governor Democratic Primary, 2014
| Party | Candidate | Votes | % |
| Democratic | Shan Tsutsui (inc.) | 120,779 | 47.36 |
| Democratic | Clayton Hee | 81,255 | 36.11 |
| Democratic | Mary Zanakis | 18,274 | 8.12 |
| Democratic | Miles Shiratori | 2,593 | 1.15 |
| Democratic | Sam Puletasi | 2,126 | 0.94 |

== See also ==
- List of minority governors and lieutenant governors in the United States

Political offices
| Preceded by Colleen Hanabusa | President of the Hawaii Senate; 2010–2012 | Succeeded by Donna Mercado Kim |
| Preceded by Brian Schatz | Lieutenant Governor of Hawaii; 2012–2018 | Succeeded by Doug Chin |
Party political offices
| Preceded by Brian Schatz | Democratic nominee for Lieutenant Governor of Hawaii; 2014 | Succeeded by Josh Green |
