= Danielle Bass =

American politician

Member of the Hawaii Senate from the 18 district
- Incumbent
- Assumed office August 9, 2026
- Preceded by: Michelle Kidani

Personal details
- Born: August 1 Mililani, Hawaii, U.S.
- Party: Democratic
- Spouse: Skyler Christopher Ross (m. 2013)
- Education: University of Hawaiʻi at Mānoa (BA, MURP)

Danielle Marie Maliekekai Bass is an American politician serving as a Democratic member of the Hawaii Senate, representing District 18 since being appointed to the chamber in August 2026 following Michelle Kidani's resignation. She has worked as Hawaii's state sustainability coordinator since 2017.

== Early life and career ==
Bass was born and raised in Mililani, Oahu. She graduated from Mililani High School then earned a Bachelor of Arts in political science and a Master of Urban and Regional Planning from the University of Hawaiʻi at Mānoa. Bass also earned an emergency management certificate from the University of Cambridge’s Institute for Sustainability Leadership.

Between 2007 and 2017, Bass served as the legislative manager to state representative Ryan Yamane and policy advisor for the Committees on Water and Land; Transportation; Health; Consumer Protection and Commerce; and Tourism and Cultural Affairs in the Hawaii House of Representatives. Since 2017, Bass has served as Hawaii's state sustainability coordinator.

== Political career ==
Bass has served as chair of the Mililani/Waipiʻo neighborhood board since 2021 and as a member of the board since 2007.

In July 2026, Bass was one of three candidates named by the Democratic Party of Hawaii to succeed Michelle Kidani alongside attorney Sechyi Laiu and former Republican state representative Beth Fukumoto. The timing of Kidani's resignation meant that party officials, not voters, selected both the interim appointment and the candidate for a November 2026 special election to fill her term. Several of Bass and Fukumoto's family members were reported to be among the 23 officials on the Democratic Party of Hawaii Oahu County Committee making the selection. On August 9, 2026, Governor Josh Green announced his appointment of Bass to fill Kidani's seat.

== Personal life ==
Bass married Skyler Christopher Ross in October 2013.
