= Robert Bunda =

American politician (born 1947)

10th President of the Hawaii Senate
- In office December 2000 – January 2, 2009
- Preceded by: Norman Mizuguchi
- Succeeded by: Colleen Hanabusa

Member of the Hawaii Senate from the 22nd district
- In office 1994–2010
- Succeeded by: Laura Figueira

Member of the Hawaii House of Representatives from the 40th district: 41st (1982–1984); 13th (1984–1992)
- In office 1982–1994
- Succeeded by: Marcus Oshiro

Personal details
- Born: April 25, 1947 (age 79) Waialua, Territory of Hawaii
- Party: Democratic
- Spouse: Gail
- Profession: Businessman

Robert "Bobby" Bunda (born April 25, 1947) is a former Democratic member of the Hawaii Senate, representing the 22nd District from 1994 through 2010, when he resigned his position in an unsuccessful bid for Lieutenant Governor of Hawaii.

The 2009 Achievement Award for Public Affairs was conferred to Bunda by Filipinas Magazine. The magazine, self-described as "the Magazine for Filipinos Worldwide" named Bunda as among the "brightest lights" of the Filipino community.

Bunda announced on October 13, 2009, that he had entered the 2010 race for Lieutenant Governor for the State of Hawaiʻi.
