= Kurt Fevella =

American politician (born 1967)

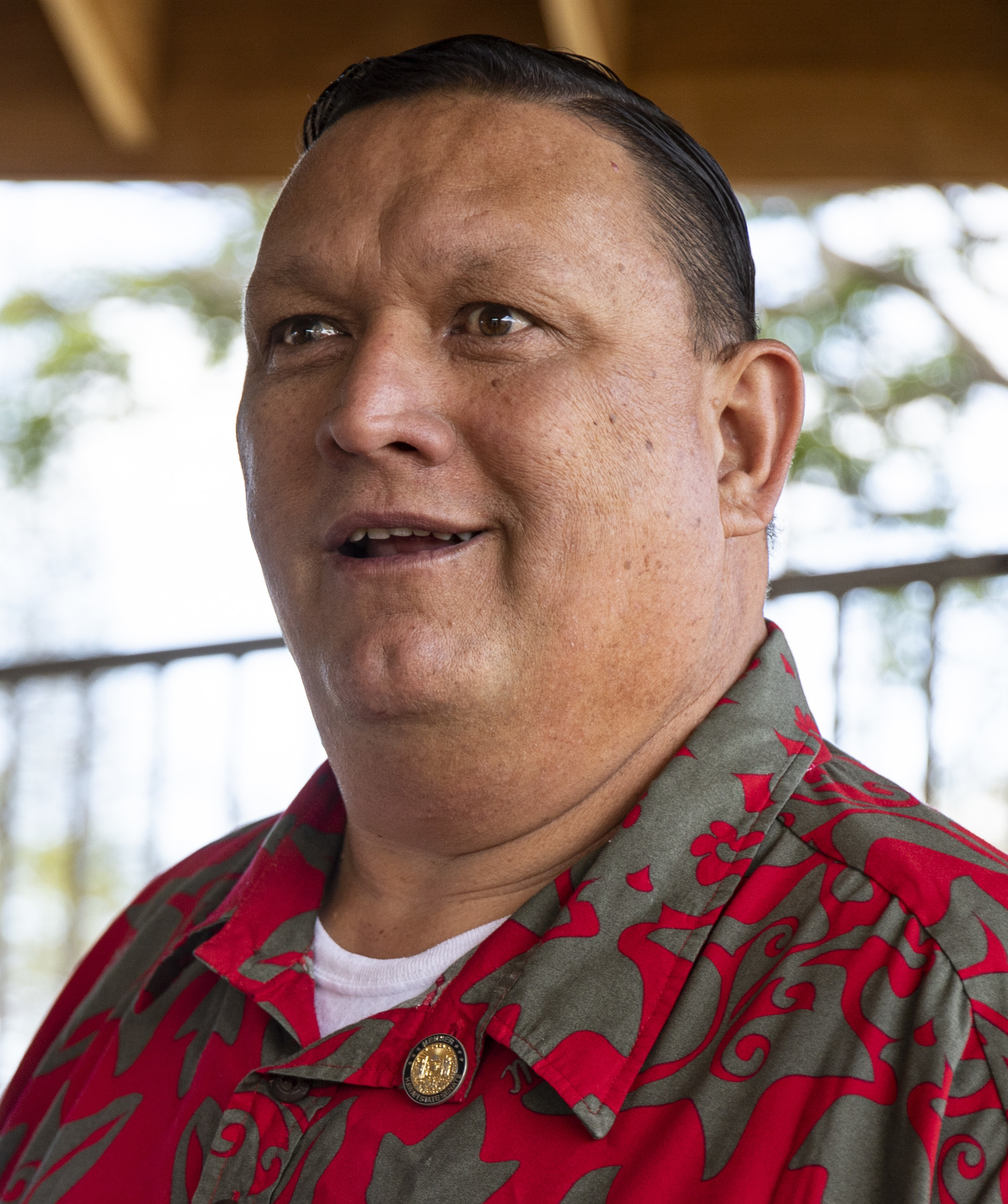

Minority Leader of the Hawaii Senate
- In office November 6, 2018 – November 8, 2024
- Preceded by: Sam Slom (2016)
- Succeeded by: Brenton Awa

Member of the Hawaii Senate
- In office November 6, 2018 – November 3, 2026
- Preceded by: Jon Yoshimura
- Succeeded by: Bob McDermott
- Constituency: 20th district (2022–2026); 19th district (2018–2022)

Personal details
- Born: October 1, 1967 (age 59) ʻEwa Beach, Hawaii, U.S.
- Party: Republican
- Website: Campaign website

Kurt Fevella (born October 1, 1967) is an American politician who served as a Republican member of the Hawaii Senate for eight years, representing the 20th district from 2022 to 2026 and the 19th district from 2018 to 2022. His victory in 2018 made him the only state senator not affiliated with the Democratic Party, and the first Republican elected to the Hawaii State Senate since Sam Slom in 2014.

In the Republican primary for the 2026 Hawaii Senate election, Fevella lost renomination to former state representative Bob McDermott following a random draw to break an unprecedented tie of 1,212 votes each.

== Career ==
Fevella was born and raised in Ewa Beach, graduating from James Campbell High School. Before running for office, Fevella was a school custodian at Ewa Makai Middle School. He became interested in community service and politics after he began attending church during the 1990s. He served on the Ewa Neighborhood board and is the president of the Ewa Lions Club.

Fevella ran in 2012 for District 40 of the Hawaii House of Representatives and lost. In 2018, Fevella defeated state Representative Matt LoPresti by 116 votes in an upset to represent District 19 in the Hawaii Senate.

Hawaii Senate
Vacant Title last held by Sam Slom; 2016	Minority Leader of the Hawaii Senate; 2018–2024	Succeeded by Brenton Awa
