= Donovan Dela Cruz =

American politician

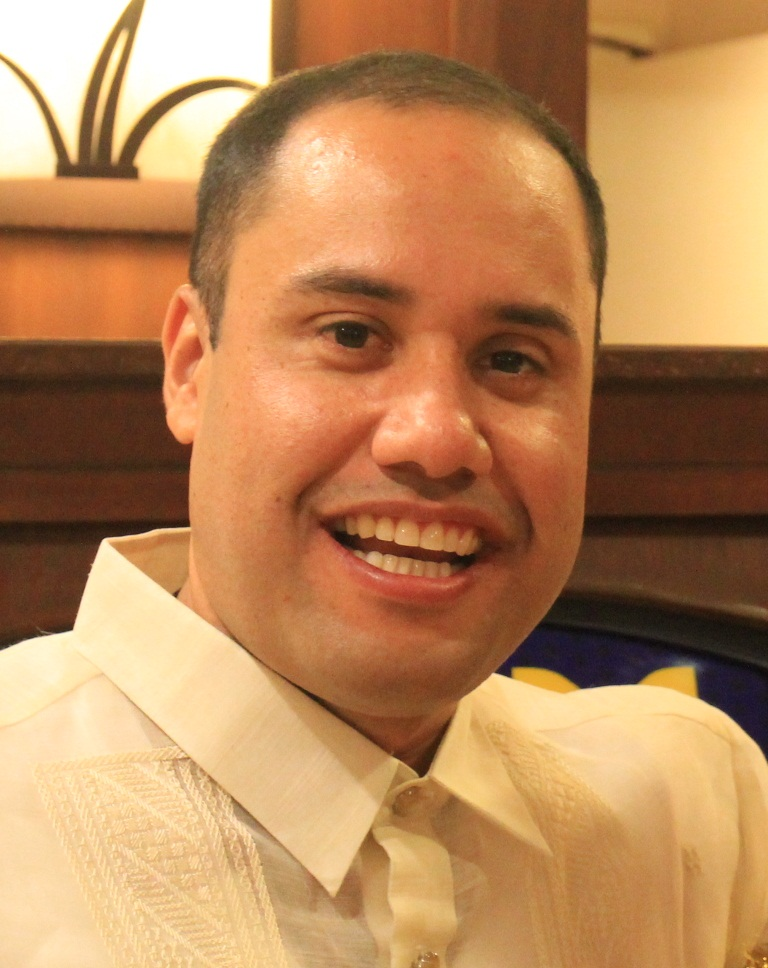
- Dela Cruz in 2011

Member of the Hawaii Senate from the 17th district 22nd (2010–2022)
- Incumbent
- Assumed office November 2, 2010
- Preceded by: Robert Bunda

Member of the Honolulu City Council for District 2
- In office January 2003 – November 2, 2010
- Preceded by: Steve Holmes
- Succeeded by: Ernest Martin

Chair of the Honolulu City Council
- In office October 30, 2003 – January 2, 2007
- Preceded by: Gary Okino
- Succeeded by: Barbara Marshall

Personal details
- Born: July 6, 1973 (age 53) Wahiawa, Hawaii, U.S.
- Party: Democratic
- Education: University of Oregon
- Website: donovandelacruz.com

Donovan Michael Dela Cruz (born July 6, 1973, in Wahiawa, Hawaii) is an American politician and a Democratic member of the Hawaii Senate since November 2, 2010, representing District 17 since 2022 and previously representing the same area as District 22 from 2010 to 2022. Since August 2017, Dela Cruz has served as chair of the Senate Ways and Means Committee.

== Education ==
Dela Cruz earned his BAs in communications and journalism from the University of Oregon. He was a member of the 2003 class of the Pacific Century Fellows.

== Elections ==
- 2012 Dela Cruz and his 2010 Republican opponent Charles Aki were both unopposed for their August 11, 2012 primaries, setting up a rematch; Dela Cruz won the November 6, 2012 General election with 10,393 votes (69.2%) against Aki.
- 2010 When Democratic Senator Robert Bunda ran for Lieutenant Governor of Hawaii and left the Senate District 22 seat open, Dela Cruz won the four-way September 18, 2010 Democratic Primary with 3,005 votes (37.8%) in a field which included Representative Michael Magaoay, and won the November 2, 2010 General election with 8,738 votes (67.3%) against Republican nominee Charles Aki.
