= Michelle Kidani =

American politician (born 1948)

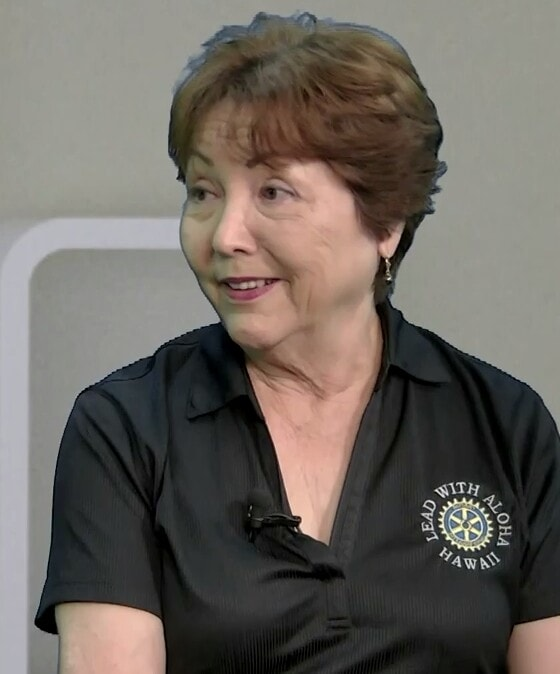

Vice President of the Hawaii Senate
- In office November 10, 2016 – June 30, 2026
- Preceded by: Will Espero
- Succeeded by: Lorraine Inouye

Member of the Hawaii Senate
- In office November 2008 – June 30, 2026
- Preceded by: Ron Menor
- Succeeded by: Danielle Bass
- Constituency: 17th district (2008–2012); 18th district (2012–2026)

Personal details
- Born: September 30, 1948 (age 78) Honolulu, Hawaii Territory, U.S.
- Party: Democratic
- Education: Honolulu Business College (attended); Leeward Community College (attended); Kennedy-Western University (BS)

Michelle Naomi Kidani (born September 30, 1948, in Honolulu, Hawaii) is an American politician and a former Democratic member of the Hawaii Senate, representing District 17 from 2008 to 2012 and District 18 until 2026. She resigned from the chamber in June 2026.

== Education ==
Kidani earned her Associate degree in 1969 as a legal secretary from Honolulu Business College, her AA in liberal arts in 1980 from Leeward Community College, and her Bachelor of Science in 1993 from unaccredited Kennedy-Western University (later Warren National University), a defunct higher education institution that was sued for fraudulent practices by former students and deemed a diploma mill by federal investigators. As of 2026, she is the vice-chair of the Hawaii Senate Education Committee.

== Elections ==
- 2012 Redistricted to District 18, and with Democratic Senator Clarence K. Nishihara redistricted to District 17, Kidani won the August 11, 2012 Democratic Primary with 7,434 votes (60.3%) against former Representative Michael Magaoay, and won the November 6, 2012 General election with 14,518 votes (67.3%) against Republican nominee Rojo Herrera.
- 2008 Kidani challenged incumbent Senator Ron Menor in the three-way September 20, 2008 Democratic Primary, winning with 3,890 votes (41.2%), and was unopposed for the November 4, 2008 General election.

Hawaii Senate
Preceded by Will Espero	Vice President of the Hawaii Senate; 2016–2026	Succeeded by Lorraine Inouye
