= Sam Slom =

American politician (1942–2023)

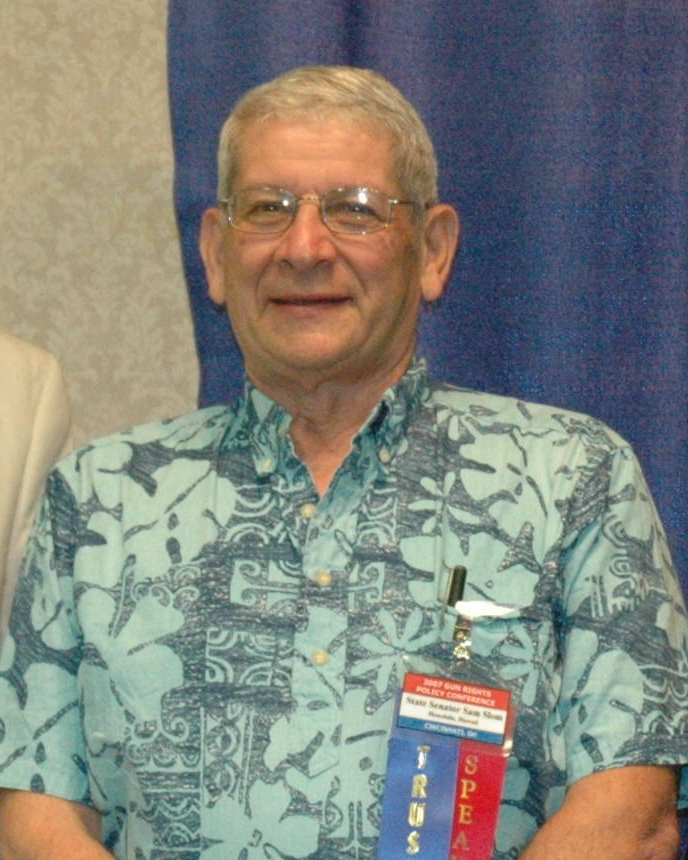

Minority Leader of the Hawaii Senate
- In office November 6, 2010 – November 8, 2016
- Preceded by: Fred Hemmings
- Succeeded by: Kurt Fevella (2018)

Member of the Hawaii Senate from the 9th district
- In office November 5, 1996 – November 8, 2016
- Preceded by: Donna R. Ikeda
- Succeeded by: Stanley Chang

Personal details
- Born: Samuel Morgan Slom; April 13, 1942 Allentown, Pennsylvania, U.S.
- Died: May 21, 2023 (aged 81) Honolulu, Hawaii, U.S.
- Party: Republican
- Education: University of Hawaiʻi at Mānoa (BA); La Salle University (LLB)

Samuel Morgan Slom (April 13, 1942 – May 21, 2023) was an American politician and a member of the Hawaii Senate, where he represented the 9th District (which included Hawaii Kai, Aina Haina, Kahala and Diamond Head on the island of Oahu) from 1996 to 2016. Between 2010 and 2016, Slom was the sole Republican member of the Hawaii Senate. He was a native of Allentown, Pennsylvania.

== Early life and education ==
Slom was raised in a Reform Jewish family and received an LL.B from La Salle Law School in 1966 and a BA in Government/Economics from the University of Hawaii in 1963.

== Career ==
Slom served as chief economist for the Bank of Hawaii. From 1983 until 2014, Slom served as the president and executive director of Smart Business Hawaii, a chamber of commerce that said it was more small business-oriented than the Chamber of Commerce of Hawaii.

In 1996, Slom challenged incumbent Democrat Donna R. Ikeda to represent the 8th district in the Senate of Hawaii. Slom won the election, defeating Ikeda, 12,191 votes to 7,312. The Honolulu Star-Bulletin called the election a "huge election night upset".

Former Honolulu City Councilman Stanley Chang defeated Slom in the 2016 elections, which made the Senate of Hawaii the only legislative chamber in the United States with a single party holding all seats. Slom received 47% of the vote.

== Death ==
Slom died on May 21, 2023, at the age of 81.

== Political experience and activities ==
Slom held the following positions in the Hawaii State Senate:

- Senate Minority Leader, Hawaii State Senate, 2010–2017
- Minority Floor Leader, Hawaii State Senate, 1996–2017
- Vice Chairman, Senate Committee for Economic Development and Technology

== Former legislative committees and subcommittees ==
Slom was a member of the following committees:

- Agriculture, Member
- Commerce and Consumer Protection, Member
- Economic Development and Technology, Vice Chair
- Education, Member
- Energy and Environment, Member
- Hawaiian Affairs, Member
- Health, Member
- Higher Education, Member
- Human Services, Member
- Judiciary and Labor, Member
- Public Safety and Military Affairs, Member
- Technology and the Arts, Member
- Tourism and Government Operations, Member
- Transportation and International Affairs, Member
- Water and Land, Member
- Ways and Means, Member

Slom was a member of the following subcommittee:

- Joint House and Senate Committee for Hawaii Health Connector Oversight, Member

Hawaii Senate
Preceded by Fred Hemmings	Minority Leader of the Hawaii Senate; 2010–2017	Vacant Title next held by Kurt Fevella; 2018
