= Mike Gabbard =

American politician (born 1948)

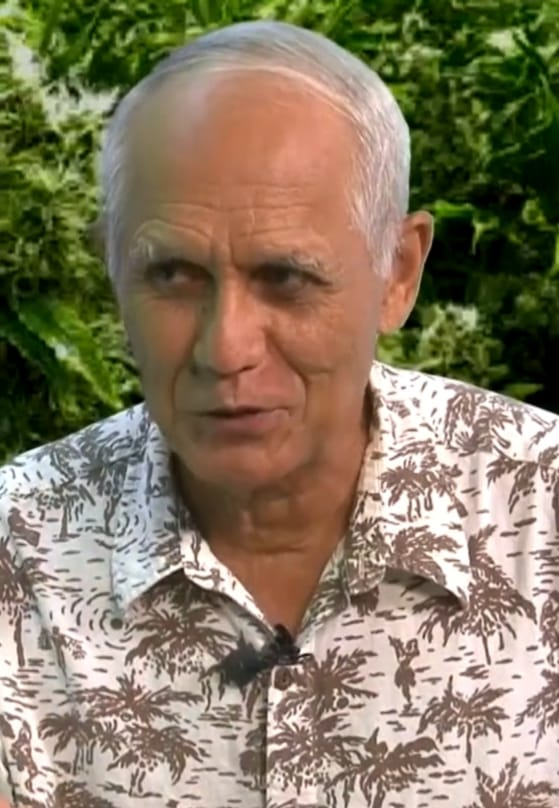
- Gabbard in 2018

Member of the Hawaii Senate
- Incumbent
- Assumed office November 7, 2006
- Preceded by: Brian Kanno
- Constituency: 19th district (2007–2012); 20th district (2012–2022); 21st district (2022–present)

Member of the Honolulu City Council from the 1st district
- In office 2002–2004
- Preceded by: Rene Mansho
- Succeeded by: Todd Kala Apo

Personal details
- Born: Gerald Michael Gabbard; January 15, 1948 (age 78) Fagatogo, American Samoa
- Party: Independent (before 2004); Republican (2004–2007); Democratic (2007–present)
- Spouse: Carol Porter (m. 1968)
- Children: 5, including Tulsi
- Relatives: Caroline Sinavaiana-Gabbard (sister)
- Education: Sonoma State University (BA); Oregon State University (MEd)
- Website: Official website

Gerald Michael "Mike" Gabbard (born January 15, 1948) is an American politician who is the Hawaii state senator for District 21 from the Democratic Party, since 2006. Gabbard rose to prominence for efforts to prevent same-sex marriage in Hawaii by passing a 1998 amendment to the Constitution of Hawaii to give the state legislature "the power to reserve marriage to opposite-sex couples" under the 1996 Defense of Marriage Act (DOMA). Gabbard, who was born in American Samoa, is the first person of Samoan descent to serve in the Hawaii Senate.

His daughter, Tulsi Gabbard, was a Democratic member of the U.S. House of Representatives for Hawaii's second congressional district from 2013 to 2021 and was a candidate for the Democratic presidential nomination in 2020. She later switched parties and served 16 months as the Director of National Intelligence during President Donald Trump’s second term.

== Early life and education ==
Gabbard was born on January 15, 1948, in Fagatogo, American Samoa, one of eight children of Aknesis Agnes (Yandall) and Benjamin Harrison Gabbard, Jr. He is a U.S. citizen from birth due to his father's U.S. citizenship. (Note: "Section 301(e) Immigration and Nationality Act (INA) provides for acquisition of U.S. citizenship by birth in outlying possessions to one U.S. citizen parent who has been physically present in the United States or one of its outlying possessions for a continuous period of one year at any time prior to the birth of such person.") Gabbard lived in Hawaii as a child and graduated from Choctawhatchee High School in Fort Walton Beach, Florida. He studied at and obtained a degree in English from Sonoma State College in 1971. He earned a master's degree in community college administration from Oregon State University.

== Early career ==
In the 1970s and early 1980s, Gabbard taught high school English in American Samoa and was a guidance counselor and later Assistant Dean of Instruction, and Dean of Adult and Community Education at American Samoa Community College. He also worked as a head tennis pro at the Kuilima Hyatt Resort on the North Shore of O'ahu in the mid 1970s.

From 1983 to 1987, Gabbard and his wife Carol established the Ponomauloa School in Wahiawa, Hawaii, where he worked as headmaster and teacher; it closed after five years.

From 1988 to 1992, Gabbard and his wife owned The Natural Deli, a vegetarian restaurant within Moiliili, Hawaii's, Down to Earth Natural Food Store. Gabbard closed the restaurant following picketing by activists after Gabbard said on his self-funded radio show, "Let's Talk Straight Hawaii", on K-108, that "If [two applicants] were both the same, then I would take the one that is not homosexual."

In the late 1980s and early 1990s, Gabbard and his wife worked for state senator Rick Reed.

In the early 1990s, Gabbard and his wife were listed as teachers for the Science of Identity Foundation (SIF).

Gabbard and his wife later started Hawaiian Toffee Treasures, a candy company in Honolulu.

== Political career ==
Gabbard was elected to the Honolulu City Council in a nonpartisan race in 2002.

In 2004, he ran unsuccessfully as a Republican for the Second Congressional District of Hawaii in the United States House of Representatives, losing to state Representative Ed Case.

On March 21, 2006, Gabbard announced his plans to run for the Hawaii State Senate in West Oahu's District 19, after 14-year incumbent Senator Brian Kanno decided not to run for reelection. On November 7, 2006, Gabbard defeated retired Honolulu police captain George Yamamoto by a 56% to 44% margin, to represent the district in the Hawaii State Senate. Gabbard was sworn in on January 17, 2007. Gabbard, who was born in American Samoa, became the first person of Samoan descent to serve in the Hawaii Senate.

On August 30, 2007, Gabbard switched from the Republican Party of Hawaii to the Democratic Party of Hawaii. His stated reason for doing so was that he believed that he could be more effective to his constituents as part of the majority party in the State Senate, where Democrats have long had a supermajority.

On November 2, 2010, Gabbard was re-elected for a second term to the Hawaii State Senate, after defeating Republican Aaron Bonar by a 74% to 26% margin. Gabbard served as the Chair of the Energy and Environment Committee from 2009 to 2015, which culminated with his leadership on the passage of a first-in-the-nation law to require Hawaii utilities to get 100% of their electricity from clean, renewable energy sources by 2045.

On November 6, 2012, Gabbard defeated Republican candidate Dean Capelouto, 72% to 28%, to represent the newly reapportioned Hawaii State Senate District 20.

During the 2016 election cycle, Gabbard was unopposed, and was re-elected to the Hawaii State Senate for a four-year term on November 8, 2016.

== Activism ==
Gabbard became an anti-gay activist before the same-sex marriage debate took hold in Hawaii. Between 1991 and 1996, Gabbard founded the organizations Stop Promoting Homosexuality Hawaii (renamed Stop Promoting Homosexuality International), Stop Promoting Homosexuality America, and the Alliance for Traditional Marriage and Values. Gabbard became well known for his advocacy for Hawaii Constitutional Amendment 2 (1998). This amendment, approved by voters 69.2%–28.6%, gave the state legislature "the power to reserve marriage to opposite-sex couples" under the federal Defense of Marriage Act (DOMA), signed by Bill Clinton in 1996.

Shortly after 9/11, Gabbard founded Stand Up For America (SUFA), a non-profit educational organization.

In 2007, Gabbard co-founded the non-profit Aloha Parenting Project (APP) with his wife Carol.

== Political positions ==
=== Same-sex marriage ===
Gabbard previously opposed same-sex marriage and civil unions, believing that marriage should only be between a man and a woman. However, in March 2024 he voted to put Amendment 1 on the ballot. Gabbard apologized for his previous opposition to same-sex marriage and stated that conversations with his daughter Tulsi led to him evolving on this issue.

=== Environment ===
In 2016, while serving as the Chair of the Water, Land, and Agriculture Committee, Gabbard authored a bill banning the sale of parts and products of endangered species.

In 2018, Gabbard authored legislation that enacted a statewide ban on sunscreens that contained the controversial chemicals oxybenzone and octinoxate. The bill also included a ban on the pesticide chlorpyrifos, and upon enactment, Hawaii became the first state to ban the substance.

In 2021, Gabbard reintroduced the Hawaii Cruelty Free Cosmetics Act, which passed the Hawaii State Legislature and would make Hawaii the sixth state to ban cosmetic animal testing, after having previously introduced the bill in 2018. He received Cruelty Free International's May 2021 award for Legislator of the Month. He also introduced and passed SCR44, a resolution which made Hawaii the first state to declare a "climate emergency".

He is currently the Chair of the Agriculture and Environment Committee.

== Personal life ==
Mike Gabbard married Carol Porter in 1968. One of Mike's daughters, Tulsi, became a politician. Mike's sister, Caroline Sinavaiana-Gabbard, was a professor and writer who died in a stabbing in May 2024.

A socially conservative Catholic, Gabbard serves as a lector at St. Jude's Catholic Church in Makakilo, Hawaii. In the 1970s, Gabbard and his wife became devotees of Chris Butler, who founded the Science of Identity Foundation. Gabbard became vegetarian and gave his children Hindu names.

== See also ==
- List of American politicians who switched parties in office
