= Karl Rhoads =

American politician (born 1963)

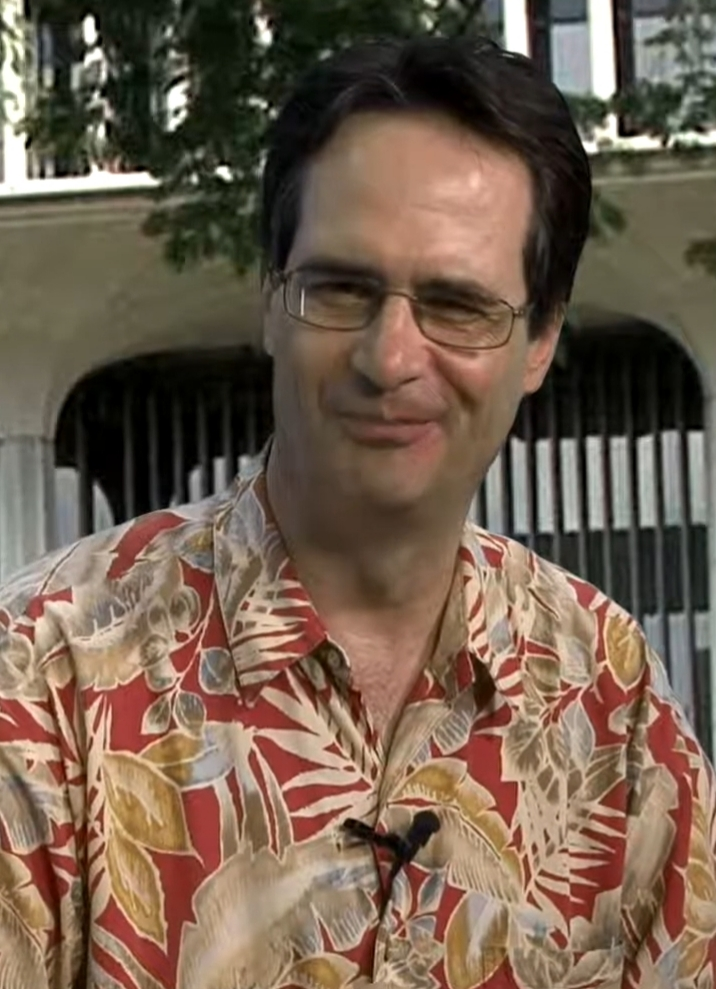

Member of the Hawaii Senate from the 13th district
- In office November 8, 2016 – November 3, 2026
- Preceded by: Suzanne Chun Oakland
- Succeeded by: Tricia Nakamatsu

Member of the Hawaii House of Representatives from the 29th district 28th (2006–2012)
- In office November 7, 2006 – November 8, 2016
- Preceded by: Ken Hiraki
- Succeeded by: Daniel Holt

Personal details
- Born: January 24, 1963 (age 63) Michigan, U.S.
- Party: Democratic
- Spouse: Cindy McMillan
- Education: Andrews University (BA); University of London (MA); George Washington University (JD)
- Profession: Lawyer
- Website: karlrhoads.org

Karl Allen Rhoads (born January 24, 1963) is an American politician and lawyer. A Democrat, Rhoads served in the Hawaii State Legislature for 20 years, most recently as a member of the Hawaii Senate for District 13 from 2016 to 2026. At the time of his departure, he was known by his colleagues as the most progressive state senator.

Rhoads previously served consecutively from 2012 to 2016 representing District 29 in the Hawaii House of Representatives and from November 2006 to 2012 in the District 28 seat.

== Education and career ==
Rhoads was born in Michigan and grew up in Indiana. He earned his BA in chemistry and history at Andrews University, his MA at the University of London, and his JD from George Washington University.

He previously worked as legislative staff for former U.S. representatives Eliot Engel and Louise Slaughter and as an intern to former U.S. senator John Kerry.

Rhoads was a summer clerk for Corinne Watanabe on the Intermediate Court of Appeals in 1985. In 1996, he moved to Honolulu to join a law firm and quit after developing chronic fatigue. He then worked for former state representatives Marilyn Lee and Ken Hiraki.

=== Member of the Hawaii State Legislature (2006–2026) ===
As chair of the House Judiciary Committee, Rhoads was instrumental in presiding over a key same-sex marriage bill in 2013, which he voted for and helped pass. In 2018, following the 2017 Las Vegas shooting, Rhoads played a major role in passing a law banning bump stocks and other devices that augment semiautomatic rifles to perform like machine guns.

In 2026, Rhoads authored a bill to prohibit corporations from spending money or contributing "anything of value" to influence elections or ballot measures, which was signed into law by governor Josh Green in May 2026. Rhoads's bill was touted as the first-in-the-nation to target the pivotal Citizens United v. FEC (2010) ruling which allowed unlimited spending by corporations in elections.

== Electoral history ==
- 2006 When Democratic Representative Ken Hiraki retired and left the District 28 seat open, Rhoads won the three-way September 26, 2006 Democratic Primary with 1,920 votes (59.4%), and won the November 7, 2006 General election with 2,547 votes (49.9%) against Republican nominee Collin Wong.
- 2008 Rhoads was unopposed for both the September 20, 2008 Democratic Primary, winning with 1,812 votes, and the November 4, 2008 General election.
- 2010 Rhoads was unopposed for the September 18, 2010 Democratic Primary, winning with 2,686 votes, and won the November 2, 2010 General election with 3,203 votes (52.3%) against Republican nominee David Chang.
- 2012 Redistricted to District 29, and with Democratic Representative Joey Manahan running for Honolulu City Council, Rhoads won the August 11, 2012 Democratic Primary with 1,604 votes, and was unopposed for the November 6, 2012 General election.

== Personal life ==
Rhoads is married to Cindy McMillan, who grew up in Washington, D.C. and previously worked as communications director for Governor David Ige.
