= Chris Lee (Hawaii politician) =

American politician

- Lee in 2023

Member of the Hawaii Senate from the 25th district
- Incumbent
- Assumed office November 3, 2020
- Preceded by: Laura Thielen

Member of the Hawaii House of Representatives from the 51st district
- In office November 4, 2008 – November 3, 2020
- Preceded by: Tommy Waters
- Succeeded by: Lisa Marten

Personal details
- Born: Christopher Kalani Cushman Lee; January 28, 1981 (age 45) Honolulu, Hawaii, U.S.
- Party: Democratic
- Education: Oregon State University
- Website: chrisleeforhawaii.com

Christopher Kalani Cushman Lee (born January 28, 1981) is an American politician and a Democratic member of the Hawaii Senate. He was the youngest member and only millennial serving in the Hawaii State Legislature when elected in November, 2008. He currently serves as Majority Whip and Chairman of the House Judiciary Committee. He also serves on the boards of several non-profit organizations and commissions.

Lee is a supporter of addressing climate change and has authored laws making Hawaii the first state to mandate 100 percent renewable energy by 2045, the first state to commit to economy-wide carbon neutrality by 2045, and the first state requiring all public schools and universities to upgrade and become net-zero facilities by 2035. He is an advocate for equal rights, serving as spokesperson for the campaign to pass the Hawaii Marriage Equality Act in 2013, and authoring two laws protecting transgender individuals.

Lee also successfully helped lead the campaign to expand the Papahanaumokuakea Marine National Monument into the world's largest marine protected area, and successfully led the opposition to defeat a $4.3 billion takeover of Hawaii's electric utilities by Florida-based Nextera Energy.

== Personal life ==
Lee was born January 28, 1981, in Honolulu, Hawaii. He graduated in 1999 from Iolani School. Lee graduated with a BA in political science from Oregon State University. Before getting involved in politics he worked at Big Brothers Big Sisters Hawaii, Hawaiian Airlines, and at the Hawaii State Capitol.

At 30 years old, Lee suffered a stroke while speaking at a community meeting. He spent four days in the hospital and over the succeeding months made a full recovery. Lee credits the stroke with "changing everything" for him.

== State legislature ==
=== Elections ===
In 2008, when Democratic State Representative Tommy Waters retired and left the District 51 seat in the House of Representatives open, Lee won the three-way September 20, 2008, Democratic primary against Ikaika Anderson and Shaun Christensen with 2,292 votes (54.0%), and won the November 4, 2008, general election with 5,885 votes (61.9%) against Republican nominee Quentin Kawananakoa.

In 2010, Lee was unopposed for the September 18, 2010, Democratic primary, winning with 4,102 votes, and won the November 2, 2010, general election with 5,626 votes (70.9%) against Republican nominee Maka Wolfgramm.

In 2012, Lee was unopposed for the August 11, 2012, Democratic primary, winning with 5,120 votes, and won the November 6, 2012, general election with 8,550 votes (77.8%) against Republican nominee Henry Vincent.

== Political career ==
=== LGBTQ+ rights ===
Lee is a strong advocate in favor of LGBTQ+ rights. As a freshman legislator, he supported passing legislation legalizing civil unions in 2009 and 2011. In 2013 while serving in the State Legislature, Lee also served as spokesperson for the Hawaii United for Marriage campaign to legalize same-sex marriage in Hawaii. In the midst of the campaign leading up to a legislative special session to decide the issue, Lee received a death threat for his role frequently advocating for same-sex marriage in the media. At the close of a contentious special session in October 2013, the Hawaii legislature passed the Hawaii Marriage Equality Act of 2013. On November 12, Lee delivered remarks on behalf of the House of Representatives at a ceremony in which Governor Neil Abercrombie signed the bill into law, making Hawaii the 15th state to legalize same-sex marriage. "It is never the wrong time to do the right thing," Lee noted in his speech.

In 2015, Lee authored Act 226 allowing transgender individuals to change their birth certificates to reflect their gender identities as recommended by the American Medical Association. In 2016 he authored Act 135 barring health insurance companies from discriminating against transgender individuals by unfairly denying them medical coverage.

=== Money in politics and elections ===
In 2009, his first year in office as a state legislator, Lee successfully authored an amendment to House Bill 2003, which prohibited state contractors from making political contributions.

In 2013, Lee authored Act 112 which created a new law requiring super PACs to disclose their top donors in all elections advertising. Lee has also been a strong supporter of improving publicly funded elections to ensure all candidates equal voice, and reduce the influence of money in elections, and has supported calls to overturn the Citizens United decision.

=== Efforts to enact industrial pesticide regulation ===
In 2010, following reports of aerial pesticide spraying impacting the health of children and families in Hawaii, Lee introduced the first of a series of bills to address the business practices of large pesticide companies and their impacts on public health. This bill sought to protect small farmers from lawsuits routinely used by large pesticide companies to intimidate and threaten smaller farmers. The bill failed to pass.

As a member of the Committee on Energy and Environmental Protection, Lee questioned states officials on the large quantities of unreported pesticides being sprayed around the state.

In 2015 Lee passed a law to help farmers end their dependence on pesticides sold by large pesticide companies by creating the first tax breaks of up to $50,000 per year for organic farmers.

In 2018 Lee helped negotiate a deal between lawmakers to overcome strong lobbying and opposition by pesticide companies to pass a law setting a new precedent by making Hawaii the first state to ban the toxic pesticide chlorpyrifos, requiring disclosure of pesticides being sprayed, and establishing 100 foot pesticide buffer zones around all public schools. The following year, California, Oregon, New York and Connecticut introduced similar legislation following the success of the ban in Hawaii.

This political battle over pesticide regulation in Hawaii was the subject of a 2019 documentary Poisoning Paradise, produced by Pierce Brosnan and directed by Keely Shaye Brosnan.

=== NextEra Energy and utilities reform ===
In 2014, Florida-based NextEra Energy launched a $4.3 billion bid to acquire Hawaiian Electric Industries, which includes 3 of Hawaii's major electric utilities serving over 90 percent of the state's households. After months of investigation in which it became clear NextEra Energy Inc. would pass an excessive $30 billion in costs to consumers, Lee became the first Legislator to publicly oppose the acquisition. Lee led the opposition amongst state legislators and county leaders, organizing support from over 40 other elected officials from both parties. Lee pushed legislation to stop the acquisition in the 2016 legislative session, and successfully included $1.2 million in the 2016 state budget to examine alternative utility ownership and business models. At the announcement of the acquisition in December 2015, public polls showed 32 percent public support for the acquisition. By February 2016, support had declined to just 16 percent. The Public Utilities Commission subsequently rejected the acquisition in July, 2016.

In 2017, Lee authored the Hawaii Ratepayer Protection Act, which required the Public Utilities Commission to "directly tie electric utility revenues to a utility's achievement on performance metrics" such as progress toward integration of renewable energy, customer satisfaction, rate affordability, data sharing with other stakeholders, and interconnection of customer distributed generation. The Hawaii Ratepayer Protection Act passed in 2018 as Senate Bill 2939 and was signed into law as Act 5.

=== Papahanaumokuakea Marine National Monument expansion ===
In late August, 2016, then-U.S. president Barack Obama signed an executive order expanding the Papahanaumokuakea Marine National Monument, making it the world's largest marine protected area. Lee, who had led grassroots efforts in support of the expansion, joined Obama at the announcement ceremony.

=== Renewable energy and climate change ===
Lee actively promotes renewable energy and addressing climate change. In 2014 he authored the Hawaii Climate Adaptation Initiative, which established the State of Hawaii's framework to address climate change.

When utilities were accused of blocking homeowners from installing their own rooftop solar panels, Lee convened oversight hearings and passed Act 109, directing the utility to allow customers to install more rooftop solar panels.

In 2015, Lee authored Act 97, which made Hawaii the first state to require all utilities to sell 100 percent renewable energy by 2045. Lee also authored laws in 2015 and 2016 directing all public schools and university campuses to become energy net-zero and generate their own renewable power by 2035, and another law creating a green special fund to help the university pay for these upgrades.

In 2018, Lee authored and passed Act 15, which made Hawaii the first state legally committing to a zero-emissions economy and statewide carbon neutrality by 2045. He also authored Act 17, which ensures all projects prepare for sea level rise by requiring all environmental impact statements to consider its implications.

Since 2015, Lee has worked with policymakers and organized local advocates in other states to help spread policies committing states and cities to 100 percent clean energy and carbon neutrality.

=== Other legislation ===
Lee has also passed legislation making Hawaii the first state to commit to ensuring basic financial security for all families and begin exploring a guaranteed income for all residents. He passed laws establishing the nation's first tax credits for organic farming.

In November 2017, Lee, along with Rep. Sean Quinlan, became the first elected officials in the United States to raise concerns about predatory online gaming practices involving loot boxes encouraging minors to gamble after the Star Wars Battlefront II monetization controversy.
