= Ron Kouchi =

American politician

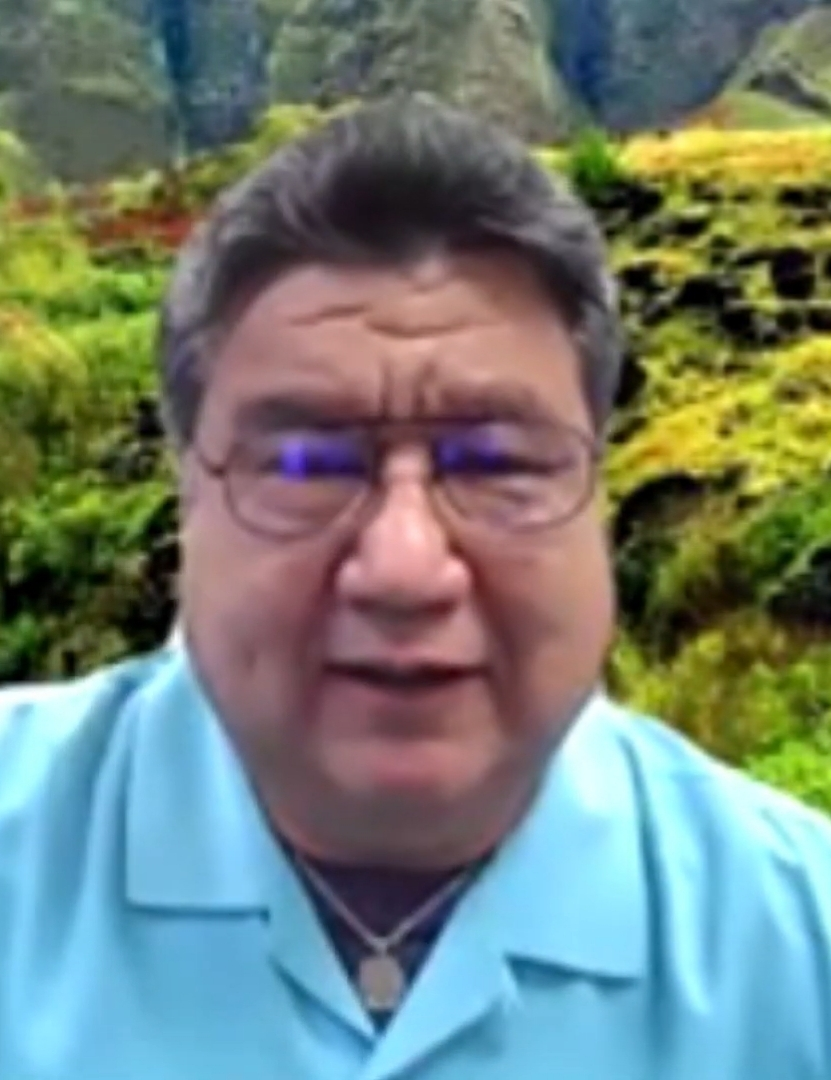

President of the Hawaii Senate
- Incumbent
- Assumed office May 5, 2015
- Preceded by: Donna Mercado Kim

Vice President of the Hawaii Senate
- In office December 28, 2012 – November 5, 2014
- Preceded by: Donna Mercado Kim
- Succeeded by: Will Espero

Member of the Hawaii Senate from the 8th district
- Incumbent
- Assumed office September 7, 2010
- Appointed by: Linda Lingle
- Preceded by: Gary Hooser

Personal details
- Born: Ronald Dan Kouchi; 1957 or 1958 (age 68–69) Los Angeles, California, U.S.
- Party: Democratic
- Spouse: Joy Tanimoto
- Children: 2
- Education: Drake University (BA)
- Website: Campaign website

Ronald Dan Kouchi (born 1957/1958) is a Democratic politician from Hawaii, representing the 8th district in the state Senate since his appointment in 2010. He has served as the 14th President of the Hawaiʻi Senate since 2015.

== Personal life ==
Ron Kouchi is married to Joy Naomi Tanimoto. He has two sons, Dan and Egan.

== Career ==
Kouchi received his high school diploma from Waimea High School and attended Drake University in Des Moines, Iowa. He served as a lobbyist for the County of Kaua‘i at the Hawai‘i State Legislature and is a former member of the Legislative Committee of the Kaua'i Chamber of Commerce. He served for 22 years (11 terms) as a Kaua‘i County Councilman, including 12 years as Council Chair. He is a former director of the Kaua‘i Island Utility Cooperative (2003-2006) and the Kaua‘i Visitors Bureau. He served on the boards of the Kaua‘i Veterans Memorial Hospital and YMCA, and chaired the Wilcox Health Foundation’s capital campaign. He worked as a legislative analyst for the former Rep. Dennis Yamada in 1982, before getting appointed to the Senate (District 7) for the first time in 2010. He was elected to the Senate (District 8) in 2012.

He has served as the Vice-Chair of the Committee on Agriculture, the Vice Chair of the Committee on Tourism, and the Majority Caucus Leader. He has sponsored 244 bills.

== Electoral history ==
=== 2010 Hawaii State Senate election, District 7 ===
Kouchi defeated John Sydney Yamane in the September 18 primary and Republican candidate David Hamman and Nonpartisan candidate Alfred Darling in the Hawaii State Senate elections 2010.

Candidate	Party	Votes	%
Ronald Kouchi	Democratic Party (United States)	14,438	69.81
David Hamman	Republican Party (United States)	6,245	30.19
Total		20,683	100.00

=== 2012 Hawaii State Senate election, District 8 ===
Candidate	Party	Votes	%
Ronald Kouchi	Democratic Party (United States)	17,887	77.69
William Georgi	Republican Party (United States)	5,138	22.31
Total		23,025	100.00

Political offices
Preceded by Donna Mercado Kim	President of the Hawaii Senate; 2015–present	Incumbent
