= List of presidents of the Hawaii Senate =

President of Hawaii Senate Ka Pelekikena o Ka ʻAha Kenekoa

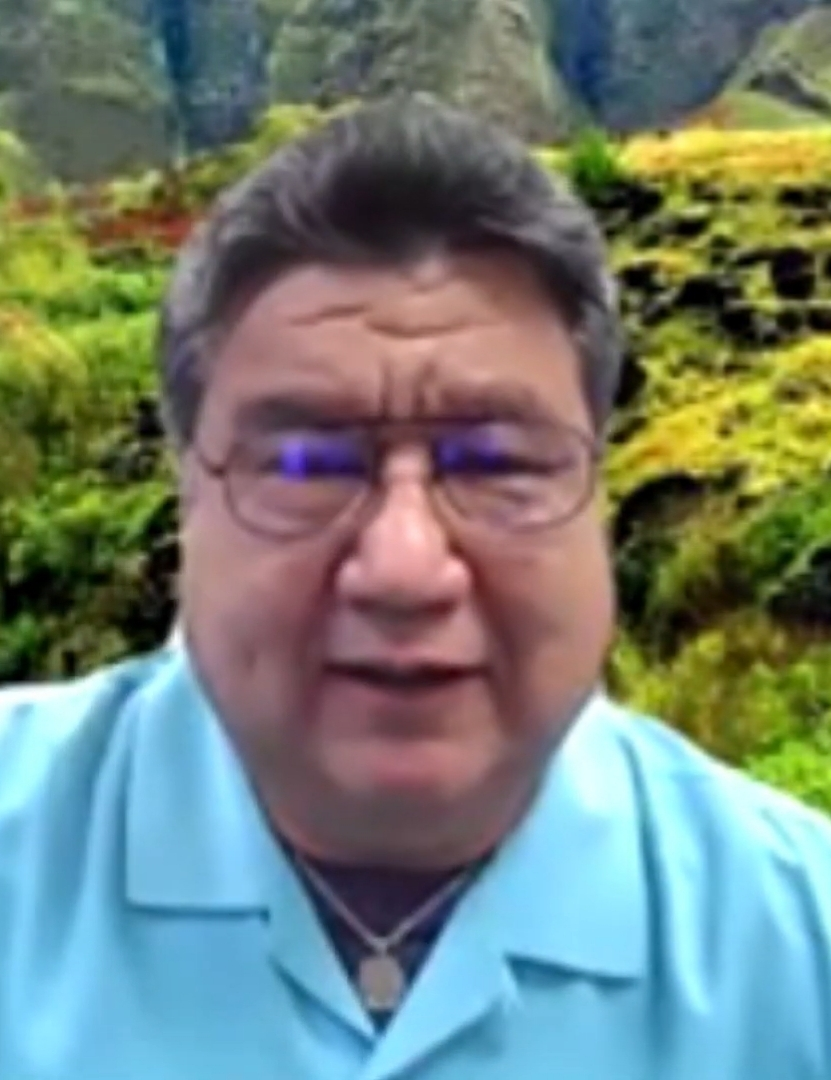
- Incumbent; Ron Kouchi since May 5, 2015
- Status: Presiding officer
- Seat: Hawaii State Capitol, Honolulu
- Appointer: Hawaii Senate
- Succession: Second
- Website: www.capitol.hawaii.gov

The president of the Hawaii Senate (Hawaiian: Ka Pelekikena o Ka ʻAha Kenekoa) is the presiding officer of the upper chamber of the Hawaii Territorial and Hawaii State Legislature.

== Territorial Senate ==
Name	Period
Nicholas Russel	1901
Samuel E. Kaiue	1901
Clarence L. Crabbe	1902–1904
D. Paul R. Isenberg	1905
E. Faxon Bishop	1907
William Owen Smith	1909
Eric Alfred Knudsen	1911–1913
Charles F. Chillingworth	1915–1921
Lawrence M. Judd	1923
Robert W. Shingle	1925–1932
George P. Cooke	1933–1935
Harry A. Baldwin	1937
George P. Cooke	1939–1941
Harold W. Rice	1943
Eugene S. Capellas	1945
Clement Gomes	1947
Wilfred C. Tsukiyama	1949–1954
William H. Heen	1955–1957
Herbert K. H. Lee	1959

== After statehood ==
Sen.	Name	Party	Term of service
1st	William H. Hill	Republican	1959–1962
2nd	Nelson K. Doi	Democratic	1963–1964
3rd	Kazuhisa Abe	Democratic	1965–1966
4th	John J. Hulten	Democratic	1967–1968
5th	David C. McClung	Democratic	1969–1974
6th	John T. Ushijima	Democratic	1975–1978
7th	Richard S. H. Wong	Democratic	1979 – December 1992
8th	James Aki	Democratic	December 1992 – May 1993
9th	Norman Mizuguchi	Democratic	May 1993 – December 2000
10th	Robert Bunda	Democratic	December 2000 – January 2, 2009
11th	Colleen Hanabusa	Democratic	January 2, 2009 – November 6, 2010
12th	Shan Tsutsui	Democratic	November 6, 2010 – December 27, 2012
13th	Donna Mercado Kim	Democratic	December 28, 2012 – May 5, 2015
14th	Ron Kouchi	Democratic	May 5, 2015 – present

== See also ==
- List of Hawaii state legislatures

== Sources ==
- http://www.capitol.hawaii.gov
- http://lrbhawaii.org/hndbook/appe.html
