= Donna Mercado Kim =

American politician

Donna Kim
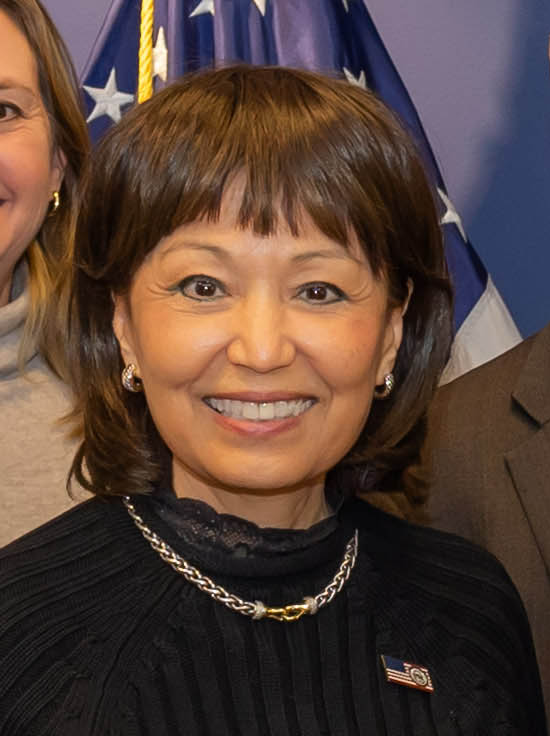
- Kim in 2023

Member of the Hawaii Senate from the 14th district
- Incumbent
- Assumed office November 7, 2000
- Preceded by: Norman Mizuguchi

13th President of the Hawaii Senate
- In office December 28, 2012 – May 5, 2015
- Preceded by: Shan Tsutsui
- Succeeded by: Ron Kouchi

Member of the Honolulu City Council
- In office January 17, 1986 – July 26, 2000
- Preceded by: Rudy Pacarro
- Succeeded by: Romy Cachola

Member of the Hawaii House of Representatives from the 40th district 29th (1982–1984)
- In office 1982–1985
- Succeeded by: Karen Horita

Personal details
- Born: 1952 or 1953 (age 72–73) Honolulu, Hawaii, US
- Party: Democratic
- Children: Micah Aiu
- Education: University of Hawaii, Manoa; Washington State University (BA)
- Website: Senator Donna Mercado Kim

Donna Mercado Kim (born 1952 or 1953) is an American Democratic party politician from Hawaii. She is a state senator from Senate District 14 and was President of the Hawaiʻi Senate for almost three years.

== Education ==
Kim attended, and graduated from Farrington High School, in Kalihi-Palama, Honolulu. Kim is a graduate of Washington State University, although she also attended the University of Hawaiʻi at Mānoa. Kim majored in Recreation during her time at Washington State University with the original goal of becoming a recreation director back in Palama after she graduated. She worked at a hamburger restaurant and cocktail waitress in college to help pay for tuition.

As a state senator, Kim is still highly involved in UH Manoa's governance. In January 2024, she clashed with UH President David Lassner over state funding to repair student housing. Kim criticized the timing of the request, saying that the university for years has neglected student housing. She also noted that there were other funding sources the university could use.

As of October 2024, Kim is helping both to find a new UH Manoa board member and a replacement for Lassner, who will step down at the end of 2024.

== Political career ==
Kim describes how she stumbled upon a career in politics by change. In 1982, after she heard about classmates who were legislators, Kim wanted to run as well. She won a tight race by 29 votes to become a member of the Hawai'i House of Representatives.

From 1982 to 1985, Kim was a member of the Hawaiʻi House of Representatives, where she represented the Moanalua, Aiea, and Kalihi communities of Hawaii.

On October 5, 1985, voters recalled three members on the Honolulu City Council, leaving three vacant seats. Kim won a special election to one of those seats on December 28, 1985 and served on the Honolulu City Council from 1986 to 2000.

Elected to the Senate in 2000, Kim has chaired the Committee on Tourism and Intergovernmental Affairs, the Committee on Ways and Means, the Special Committee on Accountability, and the Task Force on Reinventing Government.

From 2003 to 2008 and again from 2011 to 2013, Kim served as Vice President of the Senate.

In 2013, Kim became President of the Hawaiʻi Senate, replacing Shan Tsutsui who left the position to become Lieutenant Governor. Kim's tenure as President of the Senate ended in 2015.

In 2014, Kim ran for congress to fill the vacated seat of U.S. Rep. Colleen Hanabusa. She lost the race to Mark Takai.

In 2015, Kim was awarded the Korean American Foundation of Hawaii Light of the Orient Award for her contributions to the Asian-American community in Hawaii.

In 2018, Kim once again ran for 1st Congressional District seat being vacated by Congresswoman Colleen Hanabusa, as she was running for governor, but lost to former congressman Ed Case.

She currently serves as the Chair of the Committee on Higher Education and Vice Chair of Education. She is also involved with community organizations like the Kalihi Business Association and the Hawaii Korean Chamber of Commerce. Throughout her long career in Hawaii state government, Kim has sponsored more than 40 bills and cosponsored more than 360 bills.

== Personal ==
Kim was born in Honolulu to Andrew Kim and Lily Mercado Kim. Her father is Korean, while her mother is Portuguese-Spanish-Filipino-Chinese. Her maternal grandparents are Juan Mercado and Mary Carvalho Mercado Atienza. Her maternal great grandparents came from Portugal. Kim's paternal grandmother was a picture bride from Korea who married her paternal grandfather in Hawaii.

She grew up near Palama Settlement on Lakimela Lane along with four other siblings. Kim grew up in a relatively poor environment and lived in tenement housing in the same building as her uncles.

Kim is a devout Catholic, and she has one son. In 2022, Kim and her son became the first mother-son duo to serve in the Hawaii legislature at the same time.

In her free time, Kim has stated she likes sewing clothes and supporting craft fairs with locally crafted goods.
