= Stanley Chang =

American politician

- 章培志
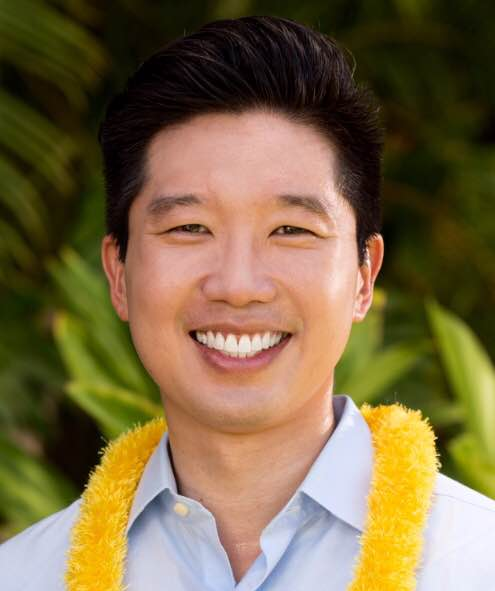

Member of the Hawaii Senate from the 9th district
- Incumbent
- Assumed office November 8, 2016
- Preceded by: Sam Slom

Member of the Honolulu City Council
- In office 2011–2015
- Succeeded by: Trevor Ozawa

Personal details
- Born: September 13, 1982 (age 44) Honolulu, Hawaii
- Party: Democratic
- Education: Harvard, Harvard Law, Iolani
- Profession: Attorney

Chinese name
- Traditional Chinese: 章培志
Transcriptions
Standard Mandarin
- Hanyu Pinyin: Zhāng Péizhì
- Wade–Giles: Chang^{1} P'ei^{2}-chih^{4}

Stanley Pai Chang (born September 13, 1982) is a Democratic member of the Hawaii State Senate, representing the 9th district. Before entering the legislature, he served as a Honolulu city councilman. He defeated Sam Slom, the last remaining Republican in the Hawaii State Senate, in 2016. Chang faced Slom a second time in 2020, and won reelection.

Chang was described by Honolulu Civil Beat in 2023 as a "longtime housing advocate." In 2022, he pushed for the construction of 100,000 housing units around the new Aloha Stadium. Chang argued that the parcel of land was prime for high-density affordable housing.

== Early life and education ==
Chang was born on September 13, 1982, in Honolulu, Hawaii. He was raised in East Honolulu by immigrants from China. He attended Kahala Elementary School and ‘Iolani School, where he was a member of student government and graduated magna cum laude in 2004. He attended Harvard Law School, where he studied under Elizabeth Warren. He graduated from Harvard Law School cum laude in 2008.

== Early career ==
Chang began his career as a Summer Associate at the New York-based law firm Skadden, Arps, Slate, Meagher & Flom. He then worked as an Associate Attorney at the Honolulu-based law firm Cades Schutte, specializing in real estate-related matters. During Chang's time as an attorney, he volunteered on a variety of nonprofit and education-related boards including the Organization of Chinese Americans-Hawaii, the Kahala Community Association, the Chinatown Business and Community Association, the Harvard Club of Hawaiʻi, and Family Promise.

In April 2010, Chang announced that he would be running for Honolulu City Council to represent District 4, East Honolulu, from Hawaiʻi Kai through Waikiki. Chang knocked on over 19,000 doors throughout District 4 during the election. Chang defeated challenger and fellow attorney Richard Turbin in November 2010.

During Chang's tenure on the Honolulu City Council, he served as the Chair of the Public Works and Sustainability Committee, overseeing the city's basic infrastructure services, including roads, sewers, water, and waste disposal. He additionally served as the Vice Chair of the Budget Committee, stewarding a $2 billion annual operating budget and numerous major capital improvement projects. Chang focused on making Honolulu a more environmentally sustainable city, advancing net-zero waste and clean energy initiatives.

As a result of Chang's advocacy, the City greatly expanded its road maintenance program. Chang also advocated for increasing homelessness funding, banning smoking in beaches and parks, and prohibiting the use of Styrofoam food containers.

== Career ==
=== Political campaigns ===
Chang declared his candidacy for a US House seat representing the 1st Congressional District of Hawaii in April 2013. He was defeated by Mark Takai in the August 2014 primary.

In 2016, Chang ran in the Hawaii State Senate District 9 Democratic primary, defeating Richard Kim and Michael Bennet. Chang defeated 20-year incumbent Samuel Slom in the general election of 2016. Chang ran for reelection in 2020 and defeated Samuel Slom in the general election again. He ran for reelection in 2022.

=== Committee Assignments as State Senator ===
During Chang's time in the Senate, he has served in numerous positions and covered a range of issues, with a close focus on housing. In 2017, he was the vice-chair of the Human Services Committee and was a member of the Commerce, Consumer Protection, and Health Committee, as well as the International Affairs and Arts Committee. From 2019 to 2020, he served as the Senate Housing Committee Chair; Commerce, Consumer Protection, and Health Committee Vice-chair; and a member of the Labor, Culture, and Arts Committee. From 2021 to 2022, Senator Chang continued serving as the Senate Housing Committee Chair; Commerce, Consumer Protection, and Health Committee Vice-chair; and a member of the Labor, Culture, and Arts Committee. He also became a member of the Government Operations Committee.

=== The 2016 campaign for Hawai’i State Senate District 9 ===
In his 2016 campaign, Senator Chang focused on ending Hawaii's housing shortage. This housing shortage has led to high housing prices, low homeownership rates, harm to people from lower income-level communities and/or communities of color, and a major homelessness crisis. Homelessness is a major issue in Hawaii, as Hawaii has one of the highest homelessness rates in the nation, and affects many of Senator Chang's constituents and their communities.

Another major focus in Senator Chang's campaign in the 2016 election was on making the government more responsive to the community. He supported the widespread use of technology to better connect the government and community. He specifically supported the use of the Honolulu 311 app, which allows community members to report issues and have a more efficient and timely response from the local government.

Senator Chang's campaign in the 2016 election also focused on investing additional resources in public education. In particular, he advocated for more resources to support early childhood education. An outstanding barrier seen in Hawaii is the under-resourced, underfunded, and inequitable secondary and elementary education systems, which catalyze further educational disparities. Because of the low school expenditure rates, teachers are underpaid in Hawaii. Secondly, Hawaii ranks among the lowest in the United States for expenditures per capita for elementary and secondary education. Education expenditure covers the cost of services such as meals, health, and transportation. Without adequate expenditures, students can be left without adequate food, transportation to school, and a comfortable school environment.

=== ALOHA Homes ===
Senator Chang's ALOHA Homes proposal is based on Singapore's successful and comprehensive housing model. The goal of this bill is to provide cost-effective, affordable housing at little to no expense to taxpayers. Under the proposal, the State would build high density, highly walkable housing on state-owned lands near the stations of the Honolulu rail project, selling the units to Hawaii residents who would be owner-occupants and own no other real property. The homes would be sold at cost, and buyers would receive a 99-year leasehold that would revert to the State after the end of the term.

During the 2022 State Legislative Session, Senator Chang introduced Senate Bill 2251 to allow Hawaii Public Housing Authority to construct non-subsidized housing and Senate Bill 2583 to exempt non-ceded lands set aside by the governor to the Hawaii Housing Finance and Development Corporation from classification as public land. These bills would allow the State to launch a new model housing construction to build 99-year leasehold homes for all income levels, replicating Singapore's successful model. Both bills were passed and signed into law in June and July 2022.

Senator Chang organized three housing conferences on the ALOHA Homes model, How to Achieve 65,000 Homes by 2025 (2018), Kick the Tires (2019), and 1,000 Homes per Acre (2020). He also led a housing delegation to Singapore and Hong Kong (2019) and a virtual delegation to Singapore, Hong Kong, Vienna, and Houston (2021). He will lead an in person delegation to Vienna in September 2022.

=== Sponsored legislation ===
==== COFA Migrants ====
Senator Chang introduced Senate Resolution 177 and Senate Concurrent Resolution 215 during the 2021 State Legislative Session to address anti-Micronesian discrimination and racism in Hawaii. The resolutions notes that COFA migrants are subject to “discrimination in access to housing, education, and employment” while simultaneously “providing labor, consuming goods and services, and paying fees and taxes to the government.” The resolution resolves to “bring justice to Hawaii’s relationship with our COFA community, including providing equal access to health care, ensuring meaningful inclusion and language access in schools and workplaces, and promoting the inclusion of COFA residents in government.” Both resolutions were adopted during the 2021 session (SR177 adopted on March 31 and SCR215 adopted on April 8).

==== Mental Health and Psilocybin ====
Senator Chang introduced Senate Bill 738 during the 2021 State Legislative Session to address the accessibility of psilocybin products to relieve stress associated with depression, PTSD (post-traumatic stress disorder), and addiction. The bill was specifically written to decriminalize the use of psilocybin, remove the products from the Schedule I list, and grant its use for therapeutic purposes. The bill simultaneously "requires the Department of Health to establish designated treatment centers for the therapeutic administration of psilocybin and psilocyn," while establishing "a review panel to review and assess the effects of this measure."

===== Youth Commission =====
The statewide youth commission spearheaded by Senator Stanley Chang was codified into the state statue in 2018. The commission aims to advise "the governor and legislature on the effects of legislative policies, needs, assessments, priorities, programs, and budgets concerning the youth of Hawaii."

===== Rescue Tubes =====
Senator Chang introduced Senate Bill 2087 to exempt landowners from civil liability for hosting rescue tubes on their property. This measure sought to address the problem of non-residents drowning in the ocean and the fear of property owners to host rescue tubes in an effort to save lives out of fear of liability if something went wrong. The bill required “an amendment of the Good Samaritan Law to provide vicarious liability exemptions for owners and operators of any premises, property, or facility where rescue tubes are located for the storage, maintenance, or use of the rescue tubes”. The bill was passed by the State Legislature and signed into law on July 6, 2018.

===== Styrofoam Ban =====
Senate Bill 2498 was introduced by Senator Chang during the 2018 State Legislative Session to ban the sale and use of polystyrene containers statewide. The bill aimed to protect the State's economy and environment caused by the fragments of polystyrene that poison the environment and local food chain. The bill simultaneously authorized the Department of Health to adopt rules to implement the prohibition and include a requirement for prepared food vendors to educate their customers about proper disposal of non reusable food containers and litter reduction. Although the bill ultimately failed to pass, over 500 written testimonies were submitted in its favor, with only a few in opposition.

===== Subminimum Wage =====
Senator Chang introduced Senate Bill 793 during the 2021 State Legislative Session to repeal the outdated provision of state law that exempted individuals with disabilities from minimum wages requirement. The exception dates back to the federal Fair Labor Standards Act of 1938. Senate Bill 793 states that the federal statute no longer fulfills its original objective to offer employment opportunities for the disabled and contradicts the 1990 Americans With Disabilities Act. This bill was signed into law in June 2021.

===== Banning Conversion Therapy =====
In 2018, Senator Chang's Senate Bill 270, which prohibits conversion therapy for LGBTQ youths under the age of 18, was signed into law. The bill banned “sexual orientation change efforts,” including the practice of attempting to change a person's sexual orientation, gender identity or gender expression done by licensed persons who provide professional counseling on minors. This bill made Hawaii the twelfth state to put such prohibitions in place.
