= 2020 Hawaii House of Representatives election =

- November 3, 2020

All 51 seats in the Hawaii House of Representatives 26 seats needed for a majority
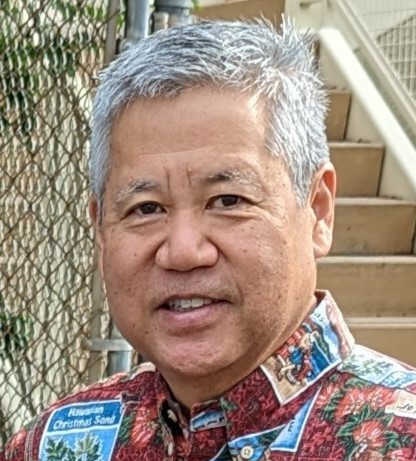

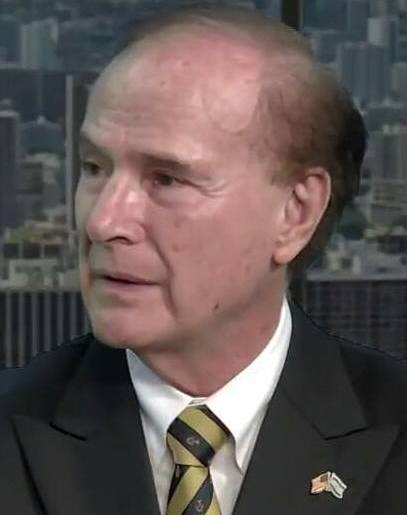
	Majority party	Minority party
Leader	Scott Saiki	Gene Ward
Party	Democratic	Republican
Leader's seat	26th	17th
Last election	46	5
Seats before	46	5
Seats won	47	4
Seat change	▲1	▼1
Popular vote	240,042	105,475
Percentage	65.8%	28.9%
- Results: Democratic hold Democratic gain Republican hold
Speaker before election
Scott Saiki
Democratic
Elected Speaker
Scott Saiki
Democratic

The 2020 Hawaii House of Representatives elections took place on November 3, 2020, as part of the biennial 2020 United States elections. The process elected all 51 seats in the Hawaii House of Representatives. Primary elections took place on August 8.

== Predictions ==
Source	Ranking	As of
The Cook Political Report	Safe D	October 21, 2020

== Results ==
District	Incumbent	Party	Elected representative	Party
1	Mark Nakashima	Dem	Mark Nakashima	Dem
2	Chris Toshiro Todd	Dem	Chris Toshiro Todd	Dem
3	Richard Onishi	Dem	Richard Onishi	Dem
4	Joy San Buenaventura	Dem	Greggor Ilagan	Dem
5	Richard Creagan	Dem	Jeanné Kapela	Dem
6	Nicole Lowen	Dem	Nicole Lowen (Note: Without opposition, the general election was canceled and the incumbent was automatically reelected.)	Dem
7	David Tarnas	Dem	David Tarnas	Dem
8	Troy Hashimoto	Dem	Troy Hashimoto	Dem
9	Justin Woodson	Dem	Justin Woodson	Dem
10	Angus McKelvey	Dem	Angus McKelvey	Dem
11	Tina Wildberger	Dem	Tina Wildberger	Dem
12	Kyle Yamashita	Dem	Kyle Yamashita	Dem
13	Lynn DeCoite	Dem	Lynn DeCoite	Dem
14	Nadine Nakamura	Dem	Nadine Nakamura	Dem
15	James Tokioka	Dem	James Tokioka	Dem
16	Dee Morikawa	Dem	Dee Morikawa	Dem
17	Gene Ward	Rep	Gene Ward	Rep
18	Mark Hashem	Dem	Mark Hashem	Dem
19	Bertrand Kobayashi	Dem	Bertrand Kobayashi	Dem
20	Calvin Say	Dem	Jackson Sayama	Dem
21	Scott Nishimoto	Dem	Scott Nishimoto	Dem
22	Tom Brower	Dem	Adrian Tam	Dem
23	Dale Kobayashi	Dem	Dale Kobayashi	Dem
24	Della Au Belatti	Dem	Della Au Belatti	Dem
25	Sylvia Luke	Dem	Sylvia Luke	Dem
26	Scott Saiki	Dem	Scott Saiki	Dem
27	Takashi Ohno	Dem	Takashi Ohno	Dem
28	John Mizuno	Dem	John Mizuno	Dem
29	Daniel Holt	Dem	Daniel Holt	Dem
30	Romeo Munoz Cachola	Dem	Sonny Ganaden	Dem
31	Aaron Ling Johanson	Dem	Aaron Ling Johanson	Dem
32	Linda Ichiyama	Dem	Linda Ichiyama	Dem
33	Sam Satoru Kong	Dem	Sam Satoru Kong	Dem
34	Gregg Takayama	Dem	Gregg Takayama	Dem
35	Roy Takumi	Dem	Roy Takumi	Dem
36	Val Okimoto	Rep	Val Okimoto	Rep
37	Ryan Yamane	Dem	Ryan Yamane	Dem
38	Henry Aquino	Dem	Henry Aquino	Dem
39	Ty Cullen	Dem	Ty Cullen	Dem
40	Bob McDermott	Rep	Bob McDermott	Rep
41	Rida Cabanilla	Dem	Matthew LoPresti	Dem
42	Sharon Har	Dem	Sharon Har	Dem
43	Stacelynn Kehaulani Eli	Dem	Stacelynn Kehaulani Eli	Dem
44	Cedric Gates	Dem	Cedric Gates	Dem
45	Lauren Matsumoto	Rep	Lauren Matsumoto	Rep
46	Amy Perruso	Dem	Amy Perruso	Dem
47	Sean Quinlan	Dem	Sean Quinlan	Dem
48	Lisa Kitagawa	Dem	Lisa Kitagawa	Dem
49	Scot Matayoshi	Dem	Scot Matayoshi	Dem
50	Cynthia Thielen	Rep	Patrick Branco	Dem
51	Chris Lee	Dem	Lisa Marten	Dem

Summary of the November 3, 2020 Hawaii House of Representatives election results
Party	Candidates	Votes		Seats		
Party	Candidates	#	%	Seats		
Party	Candidates	#	%	Before	Won	+/–
Democratic	51	240,006	65.27%	46	47	▲1
Republican	28	108,475	29.50%	5	4	▼1
Aloha ʻĀina	12	15,061	4.10%	0	0	Steady
Nonpartisan	1	1,964	0.53%	0	0	Steady
Libertarian	1	1,636	0.44%	0	0	Steady
American Shopping	1	573	0.16%	0	0	Steady
Total valid votes		367,715	92.89%			
Blank votes		28,014	7.08%			
Overvotes		138	0.03%			
Total votes cast		395,867	100%			
Source: State of Hawaii Office of Elections

=== Closest races ===
Seats where the margin of victory was under 10%:

1. District 41, 0.6%
2. District 36, 4.6%
3. District 43, 5.1%

== Retiring incumbents ==
Six incumbent representatives (5 Democrats and one Republican) did not seek reelection in 2020.

1. District 4: Joy San Buenaventura (D) to run for State Senate
2. District 5: Richard Creagan (D)
3. District 20: Calvin Say (D) to run for Honolulu City Council
4. District 41: Rida Cabanilla (D) to run for State Senate
5. District 50: Cynthia Thielen (R)
6. District 51: Chris Lee (D) to run for State Senate

== Defeated incumbents ==
=== In primary ===
Two incumbent representatives, both Democrats, sought reelection but were defeated in the August 8 primary.

1. District 22: Tom Brower (D)
2. District 30: Romeo Munoz Cachola (D)

== Detailed results ==
Source for primary results: Source for general election results:

=== District 1 ===
Hawaii's 1st House District general election, 2020
Party	Candidate	Votes	%
Democratic	Mark Nakashima (incumbent)	8,851	71.7
Republican	Lorraine Shin	3,497	28.3
Total votes		12,348	100.0
Democratic hold			

=== District 2 ===
Hawaii's 2nd House District general election, 2020
Party	Candidate	Votes	%
Democratic	Chris Toshiro Todd (incumbent)	9,552	85.7
Aloha ʻĀina	Devin McMackin	1,589	14.3
Total votes		11,141	100.0
Democratic hold			

=== District 3 ===
Hawaii's 3rd House District general election, 2020
Party	Candidate	Votes	%
Democratic	Richard Onishi (incumbent)	8,228	72.2
Republican	Susan Hughes	3,165	17.8
Total votes		11,393	100.0
Democratic hold			

=== District 4 ===
Democratic primary

Hawaii's 4th House District Democratic primary, 2020
Party	Candidate	Votes	%
Democratic	Greggor Ilagan	3,683	61.7
Democratic	Eileen Ohara	2,284	38.3
Total votes		5,967	100.0

General election

Hawaii's 4th House District general election, 2020
Party	Candidate	Votes	%
Democratic	Greggor Ilagan	7,801	70.1
Republican	Hope Cermelj	1,943	17.5
Aloha ʻĀina	Desmon Haumea	1,384	12.4
Total votes		11,128	100.0
Democratic hold			

=== District 5 ===
Democratic primary

Hawaii's 5th House District Democratic primary, 2020
Party	Candidate	Votes	%
Democratic	Jeanné Kapela	3,325	69.5
Democratic	Colehour Bondera	1,457	30.5
Total votes		4,782	100.0

General election

Hawaii's 5th House District general election, 2020
Party	Candidate	Votes	%
Democratic	Jeanné Kapela	8,344	77.1
Libertarian	Mike Last	1,636	15.1
Aloha ʻĀina	Citlalli Decker	843	7.8
Total votes		10,823	100.0
Democratic hold			

=== District 6 ===
Incumbent Democrat Nicole Lowen was automatically reelected without opposition, with no votes recorded.

=== District 7 ===
Incumbent Democrat David Tarnas was automatically reelected without opposition, with no votes recorded.

=== District 8 ===
Democratic primary

Hawaii's 8th House District Democratic primary, 2020
Party	Candidate	Votes	%
Democratic	Troy Hashimoto (incumbent)	4,934	74.3
Democratic	Ka'apuni	1,224	18.4
Democratic	Robert Hill III	487	7.3
Total votes		6,645	100.0

General election
Incumbent Democrat Troy Hashimoto was automatically reelected without opposition, with no votes recorded.

=== District 9 ===
Hawaii's 9th House District general election, 2020
Party	Candidate	Votes	%
Democratic	Justin Woodson (incumbent)	7,019	83.5
Aloha ʻĀina	Kahala Chrupalyk	1,383	16.5
Total votes		8,402	100.0
Democratic hold			

=== District 10 ===
Democratic primary

Hawaii's 10th House District Democratic primary, 2020
Party	Candidate	Votes	%
Democratic	Angus McKelvey (incumbent)	2,266	66.2
Democratic	Leonard Nakoa III	1,157	33.8
Total votes		3,423	100.0

General election

Hawaii's 10th House District general election, 2020
Party	Candidate	Votes	%
Democratic	Angus McKelvey (incumbent)	5,837	60.8
Republican	Kanamu Balinbin	3,163	32.9
Aloha ʻĀina	Travis Gyldstrand	606	6.3
Total votes		9,606	100.0
Democratic hold			

=== District 11 ===
Democratic primary

Hawaii's 11th House District Democratic primary, 2020
Party	Candidate	Votes	%
Democratic	Tina Wildberger (incumbent)	2,880	66.3
Democratic	Don Couch	1,467	33.7
Total votes		4,347	100.0

General election

Hawaii's 11th House District general election, 2020
Party	Candidate	Votes	%
Democratic	Tina Wildberger (incumbent)	7,661	74.2
Aloha ʻĀina	Howard Greenberg	2,668	25.8
Total votes		10,329	100.0
Democratic hold			

=== District 12 ===
Democratic primary

Hawaii's 12th House District Democratic primary, 2020
Party	Candidate	Votes	%
Democratic	Kyle Yamashita (incumbent)	4,136	58.9
Democratic	Simon Russell	2,881	41.1
Total votes		7,017	100.0

General election
Incumbent Democrat Kyle Yamashita was automatically reelected without opposition, with no votes recorded.

=== District 13 ===
Democratic primary

Hawaii's 13th House District Democratic primary, 2020
Party	Candidate	Votes	%
Democratic	Lynn DeCoite (incumbent)	3,252	50.7
Democratic	Simon Russell	3,158	49.3
Total votes		6,410	100.0

General election

Hawaii's 13th House District general election, 2020
Party	Candidate	Votes	%
Democratic	Lynn DeCoite (incumbent)	7,718	68.3
Aloha ʻĀina	Theresa Kapaku	2,000	17.7
Republican	Robin Vanderpool	1,583	14.0
Total votes		11,301	100.0
Democratic hold			

=== District 14 ===
Hawaii's 14th House District general election, 2020
Party	Candidate	Votes	%
Democratic	Nadine Nakamura (incumbent)	7,983	76.2
Republican	Steve Monas	2,490	23.8
Total votes		10,473	100.0
Democratic hold			

=== District 15 ===
Hawaii's 15th House District general election, 2020
Party	Candidate	Votes	%
Democratic	James Tokioka (incumbent)	7,712	72.8
Republican	Steve Yoder	2,880	27.2
Total votes		10,592	100.0
Democratic hold			

=== District 16 ===
Hawaii's 16th House District general election, 2020
Party	Candidate	Votes	%
Democratic	Dee Morikawa (incumbent)	7,329	73.7
Republican	Ana Des	2,611	26.3
Total votes		9,940	100.0
Democratic hold			

=== District 17 ===
Hawaii's 17th House District general election, 2020
Party	Candidate	Votes	%
Republican	Gene Ward (incumbent)	9,284	64.8
Democratic	Keith Kogachi	5,054	35.2
Total votes		14,338	100.0
Republican hold			

=== District 18 ===
Democratic primary

Hawaii's 18th House District Democratic primary, 2020
Party	Candidate	Votes	%
Democratic	Mark Hashem (incumbent)	6,096	85.3
Democratic	Tommy Driskill III	3,158	14.7
Total votes		7,145	100.0

General election

Hawaii's 18th House District general election, 2020
Party	Candidate	Votes	%
Democratic	Mark Hashem (incumbent)	9,349	67.8
Republican	Lori Ford	4,432	32.2
Total votes		13,781	100.0
Democratic hold			

=== District 19 ===
Hawaii's 19th House District general election, 2020
Party	Candidate	Votes	%
Democratic	Bertrand Kobayashi (incumbent)	8,344	76.7
Independent	Michael Parrish	1,964	18.0
American Shopping	Wayne Chen	573	5.3
Total votes		10,881	100.0
Democratic hold			

=== District 20 ===
Democratic primary

Hawaii's 20th House District Democratic primary, 2020
Party	Candidate	Votes	%
Democratic	Jackson Sayama	2,511	32.3
Democratic	Derek Turbin	2,328	30.0
Democratic	Becky Gardner	1,991	25.6
Democratic	Jay Ishibashi	939	12.1
Total votes		7,769	100.0

General election

Hawaii's 20th House District general election, 2020
Party	Candidate	Votes	%
Democratic	Jackson Sayama	9,235	74.6
Republican	Julia Allen	3,138	25.4
Total votes		12,373	100.0
Democratic hold			

=== District 21 ===
Incumbent Democrat Scott Nishimoto was automatically reelected without opposition, with no votes recorded.

=== District 22 ===
Democratic primary

Hawaii's 22nd House District Democratic primary, 2020
Party	Candidate	Votes	%
Democratic	Adrian Tam	1,964	51.9
Democratic	Tom Brower (incumbent)	1,820	48.1
Total votes		3,784	100.0

General election

Hawaii's 22nd House District general election, 2020
Party	Candidate	Votes	%
Democratic	Adrian Tam	6,080	67.9
Republican	Nicholas Ochs	2,869	32.1
Total votes		8,949	100.0
Democratic hold			

=== District 23 ===
Incumbent Democrat Dale Kobayashi was automatically reelected without opposition, with no votes recorded.

=== District 24 ===
Hawaii's 24th House District general election, 2020
Party	Candidate	Votes	%
Democratic	Della Au Belatti (incumbent)	7,189	77.2
Aloha ʻĀina	Andy Sexton	2,121	22.8
Total votes		9,310	100.0
Democratic hold			

=== District 25 ===
Incumbent Democrat Sylvia Luke was automatically reelected without opposition, with no votes recorded.

=== District 26 ===
Democratic primary

Hawaii's 26th House District Democratic primary, 2020
Party	Candidate	Votes	%
Democratic	Scott Saiki (incumbent)	3,393	51.3
Democratic	Kim Coco Iwamoto	3,226	48.7
Total votes		6,619	100.0

General election
Incumbent Democrat Scott Saiki was automatically reelected without opposition, with no votes recorded.

=== District 27 ===
Incumbent Democrat Takashi Ohno was automatically reelected without opposition, with no votes recorded.

=== District 28 ===
Incumbent Democrat John Mizuno was automatically reelected without opposition, with no votes recorded.

=== District 29 ===
Democratic primary

Hawaii's 26th House District Democratic primary, 2020
Party	Candidate	Votes	%
Democratic	Daniel Holt (incumbent)	1,742	64.8
Democratic	James Logue	946	35.2
Total votes		2,688	100.0

General election
Incumbent Democrat Daniel Holt was automatically reelected without opposition, with no votes recorded.

=== District 30 ===
Democratic primary

Hawaii's 30th House District Democratic primary, 2020
Party	Candidate	Votes	%
Democratic	Sonny Ganaden	1,560	62.5
Democratic	Romeo Munoz Cachola (incumbent)	946	37.5
Total votes		2,506	100.0

Republican primary

Hawaii's 30th House District Republican primary, 2020
Party	Candidate	Votes	%
Republican	Tess Quilingking	236	53.3
Republican	Pualani Azinga	207	46.7
Total votes		443	100.0

General election

Hawaii's 30th House District general election, 2020
Party	Candidate	Votes	%
Democratic	Sonny Ganaden	3,443	68.0
Republican	Tess Quilingking	1,617	32.0
Total votes		5,060	100.0
Democratic hold			

=== District 31 ===
Incumbent Democrat Aaron Ling Johanson was automatically reelected without opposition, with no votes recorded.

=== District 32 ===
Incumbent Democrat Linda Ichiyama was automatically reelected without opposition, with no votes recorded.

=== District 33 ===
Democratic primary

Hawaii's 30th House District Democratic primary, 2020
Party	Candidate	Votes	%
Democratic	Sam Satoru Kong (incumbent)	4,750	62.1
Democratic	Tracy Arakaki	2,897	37.9
Total votes		7,647	100.0

General election

Hawaii's 33rd House District general election, 2020
Party	Candidate	Votes	%
Democratic	Sam Satoru Kong (incumbent)	9,010	74.5
Republican	Jenny Boyette	3,084	25.5
Total votes		12,094	100.0
Democratic hold			

=== District 34 ===
Hawaii's 34th House District general election, 2020
Party	Candidate	Votes	%
Democratic	Gregg Takayama (incumbent)	7,671	63.4
Republican	Keone Simon	4,420	36.6
Total votes		12,091	100.0
Democratic hold			

=== District 35 ===
Hawaii's 35th House District general election, 2020
Party	Candidate	Votes	%
Democratic	Roy Takumi (incumbent)	5,303	65.7
Republican	Carl Hood	2,155	26.7
Aloha ʻĀina	Keline-Kameyo Kahau	611	7.6
Total votes		8,069	100.0

=== District 36 ===
Democratic primary

Hawaii's 36th House District Democratic primary, 2020
Party	Candidate	Votes	%
Democratic	Trish La Chica	4,218	58.9
Democratic	Marilyn Lee	2,940	41.1
Total votes		7,158	100.0

General election

Hawaii's 36th House District general election, 2020
Party	Candidate	Votes	%
Republican	Val Okimoto (incumbent)	6,949	52.3
Democratic	Trish La Chica	6,337	47.7
Total votes		13,286	100.0
Republican hold			

=== District 37 ===
Hawaii's 37th House District general election, 2020
Party	Candidate	Votes	%
Democratic	Ryan Yamane (incumbent)	10,049	74.5
Republican	Emil Svrcina	3,442	25.5
Total votes		13,491	100.0
Democratic hold			

=== District 38 ===
Incumbent Democrat Henry Aquino was automatically reelected without opposition, with no votes recorded.

=== District 39 ===
Hawaii's 39th House District general election, 2020
Party	Candidate	Votes	%
Democratic	Ty Cullen (incumbent)	7,420	65.8
Republican	Austin Maglinti	3,849	34.2
Total votes		11,269	100.0
Democratic hold			

=== District 40 ===
Hawaii's 40th House District general election, 2020
Party	Candidate	Votes	%
Republican	Bob McDermott (incumbent)	5,365	58.0
Democratic	Rose Martinez	3,886	42.0
Total votes		9,251	100.0
Republican hold			

=== District 41 ===
Democratic primary

Hawaii's 41st House District Democratic primary, 2020
Party	Candidate	Votes	%
Democratic	Matthew LoPresti	2,976	60.4
Democratic	Mokihana Maldonado	1,487	30.2
Democratic	Amanda Rathbun	464	9.4
Total votes		4,927	100.0

General election

Hawaii's 41st House District general election, 2020
Party	Candidate	Votes	%
Democratic	Matthew LoPresti	6,522	50.8
Republican	David Alcos	6,319	49.2
Total votes		12,841	100.0
Democratic hold			

=== District 42 ===
Democratic primary

Hawaii's 42nd House District Democratic primary, 2020
Party	Candidate	Votes	%
Democratic	Sharon Har (incumbent)	4,080	78.5
Democratic	Vickie Kam	1,117	21.5
Total votes		5,197	100.0

General election
Incumbent Democrat Sharon Har was automatically reelected without opposition, with no votes recorded.

=== District 43 ===
Democratic primary

Hawaii's 43rd House District Democratic primary, 2020
Party	Candidate	Votes	%
Democratic	Stacelynn Kehaulani Eli (incumbent)	2,316	80.0
Democratic	Michael Kahikina	579	20.0
Total votes		2,895	100.0

General election

Hawaii's 43rd House District general election, 2020
Party	Candidate	Votes	%
Democratic	Stacelynn Kehaulani Eli (incumbent)	4,089	48.9
Republican	Diamond Garcia	3,658	43.8
Aloha ʻĀina	Shaena Hoohuli	613	7.3
Total votes		8,360	100.0
Democratic hold			

=== District 44 ===
Democratic primary

Hawaii's 44th House District Democratic primary, 2020
Party	Candidate	Votes	%
Democratic	Cedric Gates (incumbent)	2,225	74.0
Democratic	Jo Jordan	783	26.0
Total votes		3,008	100.0

General election

Hawaii's 44th House District general election, 2020
Party	Candidate	Votes	%
Democratic	Cedric Gates (incumbent)	4,518	62.1
Republican	Maysana Aldeguer	2,036	28.0
Aloha ʻĀina	Joseph Simpliciano	721	9.9
Total votes		7,275	100.0
Democratic hold			

=== District 45 ===
Hawaii's 45th House District general election, 2020
Party	Candidate	Votes	%
Republican	Lauren Matsumoto (incumbent)	4,616	66.2
Democratic	Michael Chapman	2,359	33.8
Total votes		6,975	100.0
Republican hold			

=== District 46 ===
Democratic primary

Hawaii's 46th House District Democratic primary, 2020
Party	Candidate	Votes	%
Democratic	Amy Perruso (incumbent)	2,200	55.3
Democratic	Aaron Agsalda	1,781	44.7
Total votes		3,981	100.0

General election
Incumbent Democrat Amy Perruso was automatically reelected without opposition, with no votes recorded.

=== District 47 ===
Hawaii's 47th House District general election, 2020
Party	Candidate	Votes	%
Democratic	Sean Quinlan (incumbent)	5,425	57.5
Republican	Boyd Ready	4,007	42.5
Total votes		9,432	100.0
Democratic hold			

=== District 48 ===
Democratic primary

Hawaii's 48th House District Democratic primary, 2020
Party	Candidate	Votes	%
Democratic	Lisa Kitagawa (incumbent)	4,655	66.4
Democratic	Kau'i Pratt-Aquino	2,358	33.6
Total votes		7,013	100.0

General election
Incumbent Democrat Lisa Kitagawa was automatically reelected without opposition, with no votes recorded.

=== District 49 ===
Hawaii's 49th House District general election, 2020
Party	Candidate	Votes	%
Democratic	Scot Matayoshi (incumbent)	10,275	77.2
Republican	Kilomana Danner	3,031	22.8
Total votes		13,306	100.0
Democratic hold			

=== District 50 ===
Democratic primary

Hawaii's 50th House District Democratic primary, 2020
Party	Candidate	Votes	%
Democratic	Patrick Branco	3,048	53.7
Democratic	Micah Pregitzer	2,633	46.3
Total votes		5,681	100.0

General election

Hawaii's 50th House District general election, 2020
Party	Candidate	Votes	%
Democratic	Patrick Branco	7,592	61.3
Republican	Kanani Souza	4,790	38.7
Total votes		12,382	100.0
Democratic gain from Republican			

=== District 51 ===
Democratic primary

Hawaii's 51st House District Democratic primary, 2020
Party	Candidate	Votes	%
Democratic	Lisa Marten	2,858	43.0
Democratic	Coby Chock	1,768	26.6
Democratic	Scott Grimmer	1,315	19.8
Democratic	Alan Akao	706	10.6
Total votes		6,647	100.0

Republican primary

Hawaii's 51st House District Republican primary, 2020
Party	Candidate	Votes	%
Republican	Kukana Kama-Toth	1,260	62.4
Republican	Doni Leina'ala Chona	758	37.6
Total votes		2,018	100.0

General election

Hawaii's 51st House District general election, 2020
Party	Candidate	Votes	%
Democratic	Lisa Marten	6,857	55.0
Republican	Kukana Kama-Toth	5,082	40.8
Aloha ʻĀina	Erik Ho	522	4.2
Total votes		12,461	100.0
Democratic hold			

== See also ==
- 2020 Hawaii elections
