= 2022 Hawaii House of Representatives election =

- November 8, 2022

All 51 seats in the Hawaii House of Representatives 26 seats needed for a majority
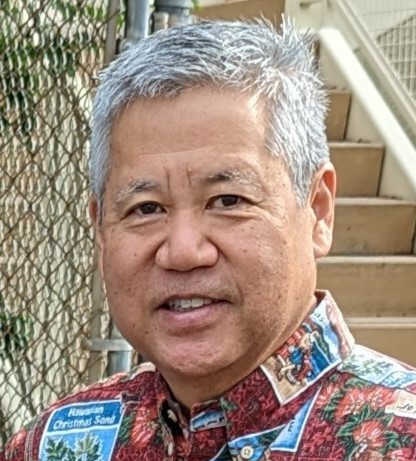

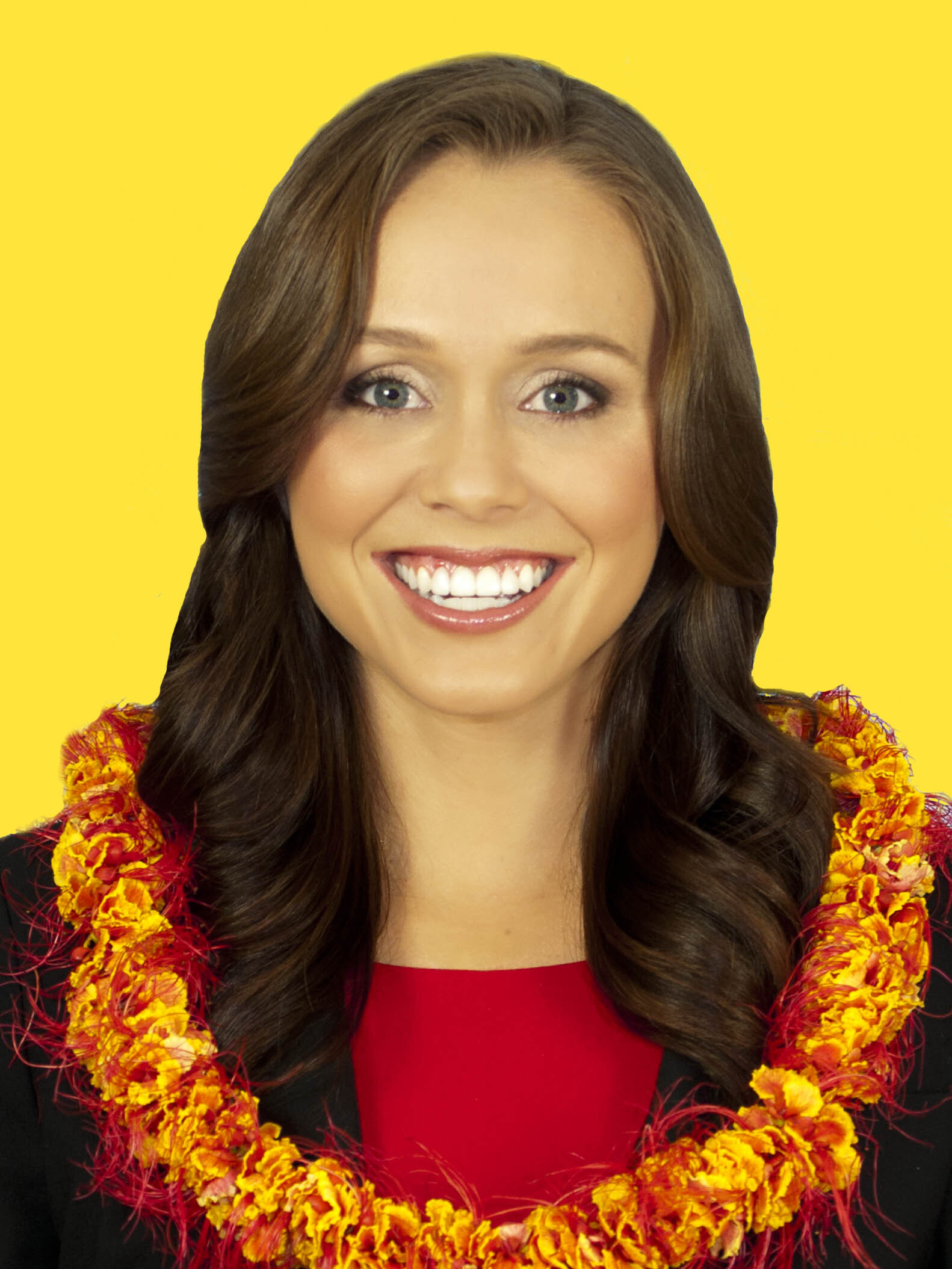
| | Majority party | Minority party |
|---|---|---|
| Leader | Scott Saiki | Lauren Cheape Matsumoto |
| Party | Democratic | Republican |
| Leader's seat | 25th | 38th |
| Last election | 47 | 4 |
| Seats before | 47 | 4 |
| Seats won | 45 | 6 |
| Seat change | ▼2 | ▲2 |
| Popular vote | 208,416 | 105,732 |
| Percentage | 65.13% | 33.04% |
| Swing | ▼0.14% | ▲3.54% |
- Democratic hold Democratic gain Republican hold Republican gain Democrats: 50-60% 60-70% 70-80% 80-90% Uncontested; Republicans; 50-60% 60-70% Uncontested
Speaker before election
Scott Saiki
Democratic
Elected Speaker
Scott Saiki
Democratic

The 2022 Hawaii House of Representatives elections were held on Tuesday, November 8, as part of the biennial 2022 United States elections. The process elected all 51 seats in the Hawaii House of Representatives.

The Democrats maintained their majority, winning 45 seats. The Republicans gained two seats in the Hawaii House of Representatives and increased their members from four to six.

Democrat Scott Saiki was retained as Speaker of the Hawaii House of Representatives.

== Members not seeking re-election ==
The following state house representatives did not run for re-election to the body, either due to retirement or to run for another elected office:

- Henry Aquino
- Patrick Branco
- Luella Costales
- Aaron Ling Johanson
- Sylvia Luke
- Bob McDermott
- Angus McKelvey
- Takashi Ohno
- Val Okimoto
- Tina Wildberger

== Predictions ==
| Source | Ranking | As of |
|---|---|---|
| Sabato's Crystal Ball | Safe D | May 19, 2022 |

== Results ==
| District | Incumbent | Party | Elected representative | Party |
|---|---|---|---|---|
| 1 | Mark Nakashima | Dem | Mark Nakashima (Note: Without opposition, the general election was canceled and the primary election winner automatically won.) | Dem |
| 2 | Richard Onishi (Note: Redistricted from 3rd district.) | Dem | Richard Onishi | Dem |
| 3 | Chris Toshiro Todd (Note: Redistricted from the 2nd district.) | Dem | Chris Toshiro Todd | Dem |
| 4 | Greggor Ilagan | Dem | Greggor Ilagan | Dem |
| 5 | Jeanné Kapela | Dem | Jeanné Kapela | Dem |
| 6 | New Seat | | Kirstin Kahaloa | Dem |
| 7 | Nicole Lowen (Note: Redistricted from the 6th district.) | Dem | Nicole Lowen | Dem |
| 8 | David Tarnas (Note: Redistricted from the 7th district.) | Dem | David Tarnas | Dem |
| 9 | Justin Woodson | Dem | Justin Woodson | Dem |
| 10 | Troy Hashimoto (Note: Redistricted from the 8th district.) | Dem | Troy Hashimoto | Dem |
| 11 | Tina Wildberger† | Dem | Terez Amato | Dem |
| 12 | Kyle Yamashita | Dem | Kyle Yamashita | Dem |
| 13 | Linda Ann Ha’i Clark | Dem | Mahina Poepoe | Dem |
| 14 | Angus McKelvey† (Note: Redistricted from the 10th district.) | Dem | Elle Cochran | Dem |
| 15 | Nadine Nakamura (Note: Redistricted from the 14th district.) | Dem | Nadine Nakamura | Dem |
| 16 | James Tokioka (Note: Redistricted from the 15th district.) | Dem | James Tokioka | Dem |
| 17 | Dee Morikawa (Note: Redistricted from the 16th district.) | Dem | Dee Morikawa | Dem |
| 18 | Gene Ward (Note: Redistricted from the 17th district.) | Rep | Gene Ward | Rep |
| 19 | Mark Hashem (Note: Redistricted from the 18th district.) | Dem | Mark Hashem | Dem |
| 20 | Bertrand Kobayashi (Note: Redistricted from the 19th district.) | Dem | Bertrand Kobayashi | Dem |
| 21 | Jackson Sayama (Note: Redistricted from the 20th district.) | Dem | Jackson Sayama | Dem |
| 22 | Dale Kobayashi (Note: Redistricted from the 23rd district.) | Dem | Andrew Takuya Garrett | Dem |
| 23 | Scott Nishimoto (Note: Redistricted from the 21st district.) | Dem | Scott Nishimoto | Dem |
| 24 | Adrian Tam (Note: Redistricted from the 22nd district.) | Dem | Adrian Tam | Dem |
| 25 | Scott Saiki (Note: Redistricted from the 26th district.) | Dem | Scott Saiki | Dem |
| 26 | Della Au Belatti (Note: Redistricted from the 24th district.) | Dem | Della Au Belatti | Dem |
| 27 | Takashi Ohno† | Dem | Jenna Takenouchi | Dem |
| 27 | Sylvia Luke† (Note: Redistricted from the 25th district.) | Dem | Jenna Takenouchi | Dem |
| 28 | Daniel Holt (Note: Redistricted from the 29th district.) | Dem | Daniel Holt | Dem |
| 29 | John Mizuno (Note: Redistricted from the 28th district.) | Dem | John Mizuno | Dem |
| 30 | Sonny Ganaden | Dem | Sonny Ganaden | Dem |
| 31 | Linda Ichiyama (Note: Redistricted from the 32nd district.) | Dem | Linda Ichiyama | Dem |
| 32 | Aaron Ling Johanson† (Note: Redistricted from the 31st district.) | Dem | Micah Pookela Kim Aiu | Dem |
| 33 | Sam Satoru Kong | Dem | Sam Satoru Kong | Dem |
| 34 | Gregg Takayama | Dem | Gregg Takayama | Dem |
| 34 | Roy Takumi (Note: Redistricted from the 35th district.) | Dem | Gregg Takayama | Dem |
| 35 | New Seat | | Cory Chun | Dem |
| 36 | Henry Aquino† (Note: Redistricted from the 38th district.) | Dem | Rachele Fernandez Lamosao | Dem |
| 37 | Ryan Yamane | Dem | Ryan Yamane | Dem |
| 38 | Lauren Matsumoto (Note: Redistricted from the 45th district.) | Rep | Lauren Matsumoto | Rep |
| 38 | Val Okimoto† (Note: Redistricted from the 36th district.) | Rep | Lauren Matsumoto | Rep |
| 39 | Luella Costales† | Dem | Elijah Pierick | Rep |
| 40 | Bob McDermott† | Rep | Rose Martinez | Dem |
| 41 | Matthew LoPresti | Dem | David Alcos | Rep |
| 42 | Sharon Har | Dem | Diamond Garcia | Rep |
| 43 | Stacelynn Kehaulani Eli | Dem | Kanani Souza | Rep |
| 44 | New Seat | | Darius Kila | Dem |
| 45 | Cedric Gates (Note: Redistricted from the 44th district.) | Dem | Cedric Gates | Dem |
| 46 | Amy Perruso | Dem | Amy Perruso | Dem |
| 47 | Sean Quinlan | Dem | Sean Quinlan | Dem |
| 48 | Lisa Kitagawa | Dem | Lisa Kitagawa | Dem |
| 49 | Scot Matayoshi | Dem | Scot Matayoshi | Dem |
| 50 | Patrick Branco† | Dem | Natalia Hussey-Burdick | Dem |
| 51 | Lisa Marten | Dem | Lisa Marten | Dem |

† - Incumbent not seeking re-election

Summary of the November 8, 2022 Hawaii House of Representatives election results
| Party | Candidates | Votes | | Seats | | |
| Party | Candidates | # | % | Seats | | |
| Party | Candidates | # | % | Before | Won | +/– |
|---|---|---|---|---|---|---|
| Democratic | 50 | 208,416 | 65.13% | 47 | 45 | ▼2 |
| Republican | 40 | 105,732 | 33.04% | 4 | 6 | ▲2 |
| Aloha ʻĀina | 3 | 3,323 | 1.04% | 0 | 0 | Steady |
| Green | 2 | 1,750 | 0.55% | 0 | 0 | Steady |
| Libertarian | 2 | 405 | 0.13% | 0 | 0 | Steady |
| Nonpartisan | 1 | 354 | 0.11% | 0 | 0 | Steady |
| Total valid votes | | 319,980 | % | | | |
| Blank votes | | | % | | | |
| Overvotes | | | % | | | |
| Total votes cast | | | 100% | | | |
Source: State of Hawaii Office of Elections

=== Closest races ===
Seats where the margin of victory was under 10%:

1. District 32, 3.36%
2. District 40, 3.26% (gain)
3. District 42, 5.56% (gain)

== Detailed results ==
Source for primary results: Source for general election results:

- Note: If a primary election is not listed, then there was not a competitive primary in that district (i.e., only one candidate filed to run).

=== District 1 ===
Incumbent Democrat Mark Nakashima had represented the 1st district since 2008. Nakashima was automatically reelected without opposition, with no votes recorded.

Hawaii House of Representatives 1st district general election, 2022
| Party | Candidate | Votes | % |
|---|---|---|---|
| Democratic | Mark Nakashima (incumbent) | – | 100% |
| Total votes | | – | 100% |
| Democratic hold | | | |

=== District 2 ===
The new 2nd district includes the home of Incumbent Democrat Richard Onishi, who had represented the 3rd district since 2012. Onishi was automatically reelected here without opposition, with no votes recorded.

Hawaii House of Representatives 2nd district general election, 2022
| Party | Candidate | Votes | % |
|---|---|---|---|
| Democratic | Richard Onishi (incumbent) | – | 100% |
| Total votes | | – | 100% |
| Democratic hold | | | |

=== District 3 ===
The new 3rd district includes the home of Incumbent Democrat Chris Toshiro Todd, who had represented the 2nd district since 2017. Todd was re-elected here.

Democratic primary

Hawaii's 3rd House District Democratic primary election, 2022
| Party | Candidate | Votes | % |
|---|---|---|---|
| Democratic | Chris Toshiro Todd (incumbent) | 2,620 | 62.57% |
| Democratic | Shannon Lopeka Matson | 1,567 | 37.43% |
| Total votes | | 4,187 | 100% |

General election

Hawaii's 3rd House District general election, 2022
| Party | Candidate | Votes | % |
|---|---|---|---|
| Democratic | Chris Toshiro Todd (incumbent) | 5,191 | 80.86% |
| Aloha ʻĀina | Devin McMackin Sr. | 1,229 | 19.14% |
| Total votes | | 6,420 | 100% |
| Democratic hold | | | |

=== District 4 ===
Incumbent Democrat Greggor Ilagan had represented the 4th district since 2020.

General election

Hawaii's 4th House District general election, 2022
| Party | Candidate | Votes | % |
|---|---|---|---|
| Democratic | Greggor Ilagan (incumbent) | 4,855 | 69.61% |
| Republican | Keikilani Ho | 1,611 | 23.10% |
| Independent | Brian C. Ley | 354 | 5.08% |
| Libertarian | Candace "Candy" Linton | 155 | 2.22% |
| Total votes | | 6,975 | 100% |
| Democratic hold | | | |

=== District 5 ===
Incumbent Democrat Jeanné Kapela had represented the 5th district since 2020.

General election

Hawaii's 5th House District general election, 2022
| Party | Candidate | Votes | % |
|---|---|---|---|
| Democratic | Jeanné Kapela (incumbent) | 4,962 | 69.42% |
| Republican | Lohi Goodwin | 1,936 | 27.08% |
| Libertarian | Michael L. Last | 250 | 3.50% |
| Total votes | | 7,148 | 100% |
| Democratic hold | | | |

=== District 6 ===
The new 6th district includes part of Hawaii County including parts of Honalo, Kealakekua and Captain Cook.

Democratic primary

Hawaii's 6th House District Democratic primary election, 2022
| Party | Candidate | Votes | % |
|---|---|---|---|
| Democratic | Kirstin Kahaloa | 2,981 | 81.83% |
| Democratic | Ilya Barannikov | 449 | 12.33% |
| Democratic | Lono Mack | 213 | 5.85% |
| Total votes | | 3,643 | 100% |

General election

Hawaii's 6th House District general election, 2022
| Party | Candidate | Votes | % |
|---|---|---|---|
| Democratic | Kirstin Kahaloa | 5,410 | 67.17% |
| Republican | Jonathan P. Kennealy | 2,644 | 32.83% |
| Total votes | | 8,054 | 100% |
| Democratic win (new seat) | | | |

=== District 7 ===
The new 7th district includes the home of incumbent Democrat Nicole Lowen, who had represented the 6th district since 2012. Lowen was automatically reelected without opposition, with no votes recorded.

Hawaii House of Representatives 7th district general election, 2022
| Party | Candidate | Votes | % |
|---|---|---|---|
| Democratic | Nicole Lowen (incumbent) | – | 100% |
| Total votes | | – | 100% |
| Democratic hold | | | |

=== District 8 ===
The new 8th district includes the home of incumbent Democrat David Tarnas, who had represented the 7th district since 2018. Tarnas was re-elected here.

Democratic primary

Hawaii's 8th House District Democratic primary election, 2022
| Party | Candidate | Votes | % |
|---|---|---|---|
| Democratic | David Tarnas (incumbent) | 3,310 | 69.25% |
| Democratic | Makai Freitas | 1,470 | 30.75% |
| Total votes | | 4,780 | 100% |

General election

Hawaii's 8th House District general election, 2022
| Party | Candidate | Votes | % |
|---|---|---|---|
| Democratic | David Tarnas (incumbent) | 5,564 | 69.14% |
| Republican | Monique Cobb Adams Perreira | 2,484 | 30.86% |
| Total votes | | 8,048 | 100% |
| Democratic hold | | | |

=== District 9 ===
Incumbent Democrat Justin Woodson had represented the 9th district since 2013. Woodson was automatically reelected without opposition, with no votes recorded.

Democratic primary

Hawaii's 9th House District Democratic primary election, 2022
| Party | Candidate | Votes | % |
|---|---|---|---|
| Democratic | Justin Woodson (incumbent) | 3,052 | 78.74% |
| Democratic | Sam (Kamuela) Peralta | 824 | 21.26% |
| Total votes | | 3,876 | 100% |

General election

Hawaii House of Representatives 9th district general election, 2022
| Party | Candidate | Votes | % |
|---|---|---|---|
| Democratic | Justin Woodson (incumbent) | – | 100% |
| Total votes | | – | 100% |
| Democratic hold | | | |

=== District 10 ===
The new 10th district includes the home of incumbent Democrat Troy Hashimoto, who had represented the 8th district since 2018. Hashimoto was automatically reelected here without opposition, with no votes recorded.

Hawaii House of Representatives 10th district general election, 2022
| Party | Candidate | Votes | % |
|---|---|---|---|
| Democratic | Troy Hashimoto (incumbent) | – | 100% |
| Total votes | | – | 100% |
| Democratic hold | | | |

=== District 11 ===
Incumbent Democrat Tina Wildberger, who had represented the 11th district since 2018. Wildberger did not seek re-election, and fellow Democrat Terez Amato won the open seat.

Democratic primary

Hawaii's 11th House District Democratic primary election, 2022
| Party | Candidate | Votes | % |
|---|---|---|---|
| Democratic | Terez Amato | 2,716 | 73.64% |
| Democratic | Randal N. Mahiai, Jr. | 972 | 26.36% |
| Total votes | | 3,688 | 100% |

Republican primary

Hawaii's 11th House District Republican primary election, 2022
| Party | Candidate | Votes | % |
|---|---|---|---|
| Republican | Shekinah P. Cantere | 680 | 50.63% |
| Republican | Netra Halperin | 663 | 49.37% |
| Total votes | | 1,343 | 100% |

General election

Hawaii's 11th House District general election, 2022
| Party | Candidate | Votes | % |
|---|---|---|---|
| Democratic | Terez Amato | 5,263 | 64.62% |
| Republican | Shekinah P. Cantere | 2,882 | 35.38% |
| Total votes | | 8,145 | 100% |
| Democratic hold | | | |

=== District 12 ===
Incumbent Democrat Kyle Yamashita had represented the 12th district since 2004.

General election

Hawaii's 12th House District general election, 2022
| Party | Candidate | Votes | % |
|---|---|---|---|
| Democratic | Kyle Yamashita (incumbent) | 7,085 | 68.69% |
| Republican | Dan Johnson | 2,118 | 20.54% |
| Green | Summer Starr | 1,111 | 10.77% |
| Total votes | | 10,314 | 100% |
| Democratic hold | | | |

=== District 13 ===
Incumbent Democrat Linda Ann Haʻi Clark had represented the 13th district since 2021. Clark lost re-nomination to fellow Democrat Mahina Poepoe, who went on to win the general election.

Democratic primary

Hawaii's 13th House District Democratic primary election, 2022
| Party | Candidate | Votes | % |
|---|---|---|---|
| Democratic | Mahina Poepoe | 2,389 | 49.44% |
| Democratic | Linda Ann Haʻi Clark (incumbent) | 1,582 | 32.74% |
| Democratic | Chase (Kealiimalu) Nomura | 861 | 17.82% |
| Total votes | | 4,832 | 100% |

General election

Hawaii's 13th House District general election, 2022
| Party | Candidate | Votes | % |
|---|---|---|---|
| Democratic | Mahina Poepoe | 5,827 | 68.15% |
| Republican | Scott Adam | 2,084 | 24.37% |
| Green | Nick Nikhilananda | 639 | 7.47% |
| Total votes | | 8,550 | 100% |
| Democratic hold | | | |

=== District 14 ===
The new 14th district includes the home of incumbent Democrat Angus McKelvey, who had represented the 10th district since 2006. McKelvey retired to run for the Hawaii Senate, and fellow Democrat Elle Cochran won the open seat.

Democratic primary

Hawaii's 14th House District Democratic primary election, 2022
| Party | Candidate | Votes | % |
|---|---|---|---|
| Democratic | Elle Cochran | 1,994 | 63.71% |
| Democratic | Kanamu Balinbin | 1,136 | 36.29% |
| Total votes | | 3,130 | 100% |

General election

Hawaii's 14th House District general election, 2022
| Party | Candidate | Votes | % |
|---|---|---|---|
| Democratic | Elle Cochran | 3,759 | 54.75% |
| Republican | Kelly J. Armstrong | 2,070 | 30.15% |
| Aloha ʻĀina | Leonard K. Nakoa III | 1,037 | 15.10% |
| Total votes | | 6,866 | 100% |
| Democratic hold | | | |

=== District 15 ===
The new 15th district includes the home of incumbent Democrat Nadine Nakamura, who had represented the 14th district since 2016. Nakamura was re-elected here.

General election

Hawaii's 15th House District general election, 2022
| Party | Candidate | Votes | % |
|---|---|---|---|
| Democratic | Nadine Nakamura (incumbent) | 5,487 | 73.91% |
| Republican | Greg Bentley | 1,937 | 26.09% |
| Total votes | | 7,424 | 100% |
| Democratic hold | | | |

=== District 16 ===
The new 16th district includes the home of incumbent Democrat James Tokioka, who had represented the 15th district since 2006. Tokioka was re-elected here.

General election

Hawaii's 16th House District general election, 2022
| Party | Candidate | Votes | % |
|---|---|---|---|
| Democratic | James Tokioka (incumbent) | 5,529 | 73.34% |
| Republican | Steve Yoder | 2,010 | 26.66% |
| Total votes | | 7,539 | 100% |
| Democratic hold | | | |

=== District 17 ===
The new 17th district includes the home of incumbent Democrat Dee Morikawa, who had represented the 16th district since 2010. Morikawa was re-elected here.

General election

Hawaii's 17th House District general election, 2022
| Party | Candidate | Votes | % |
|---|---|---|---|
| Democratic | Dee Morikawa (incumbent) | 5,459 | 73.49% |
| Republican | Michael D. Wilson | 1,969 | 26.51% |
| Total votes | | 7,428 | 100% |
| Democratic hold | | | |

=== District 18 ===
The new 18th district includes the home of incumbent Republican Gene Ward, who had represented the 17th district since 2006. Ward was automatically reelected without opposition, with no votes recorded.

Hawaii House of Representatives 18th district general election, 2022
| Party | Candidate | Votes | % |
|---|---|---|---|
| Republican | Gene Ward (incumbent) | – | 100% |
| Total votes | | – | 100% |
| Republican hold | | | |

=== District 19 ===
The new 19th district includes the home of incumbent Democrat Mark Hashem, who had represented the 18th district since 2010. Hashem was re-elected here.

Democratic primary

Hawaii's 19th House District Democratic primary election, 2022
| Party | Candidate | Votes | % |
|---|---|---|---|
| Democratic | Mark Hashem (incumbent) | 5,337 | 71.73% |
| Democratic | Kathy Feldman | 2,103 | 28.27% |
| Total votes | | 7,440 | 100% |

General election

Hawaii's 19th House District general election, 2022
| Party | Candidate | Votes | % |
|---|---|---|---|
| Democratic | Mark Hashem (incumbent) | 7,932 | 70.46% |
| Republican | Theresa (Kinsey) Texeira | 3,326 | 29.54% |
| Total votes | | 11,258 | 100% |
| Democratic hold | | | |

=== District 20 ===
The new 20th district includes the home of incumbent Democrat Bertrand Kobayashi, who had represented the 19th district since 2012. Kobayashi was re-elected here.

Democratic primary

Hawaii's 20th House District Democratic primary election, 2022
| Party | Candidate | Votes | % |
|---|---|---|---|
| Democratic | Bertrand Kobayashi (incumbent) | 4,742 | 82.27% |
| Democratic | James Logue | 1,022 | 17.73% |
| Total votes | | 5,764 | 100% |

Republican primary

Hawaii's 20th House District Republican primary election, 2022
| Party | Candidate | Votes | % |
|---|---|---|---|
| Republican | Jessica (Priya) Caiazzo | 492 | 54.85% |
| Republican | Consuelo (Liz) Anderson | 405 | 45.15% |
| Total votes | | 897 | 100% |

General election

Hawaii's 20th House District general election, 2022
| Party | Candidate | Votes | % |
|---|---|---|---|
| Democratic | Bertrand Kobayashi (incumbent) | 6,660 | 74.71% |
| Republican | Jessica (Priya) Caiazzo | 2,254 | 25.29% |
| Total votes | | 8,914 | 100% |
| Democratic hold | | | |

=== District 21 ===
The new 21st district includes the home of incumbent Democrat Jackson Sayama, who had represented the 20th district since 2020. Sayama was re-elected here.

Republican primary

Hawaii's 21st House District Republican primary election, 2022
| Party | Candidate | Votes | % |
|---|---|---|---|
| Republican | Julia E. Allen | 611 | 56.57% |
| Republican | Joelle Seashell | 469 | 43.43% |
| Total votes | | 1,080 | 100% |

General election

Hawaii's 21st House District general election, 2022
| Party | Candidate | Votes | % |
|---|---|---|---|
| Democratic | Jackson Sayama (incumbent) | 6,571 | 73.98% |
| Republican | Julia E. Allen | 2,311 | 26.02% |
| Total votes | | 8,882 | 100% |
| Democratic hold | | | |

=== District 22 ===
The new 22nd district includes the home of incumbent Democrat Dale Kobayashi, who had represented the 23rd district since 2018. Kobayashi ran for re-election here, but lost re-nomination to fellow Democrat Andrew Takuya Garrett, who went on to win the general election.

Democratic primary

Hawaii's 22nd House District Democratic primary election, 2022
| Party | Candidate | Votes | % |
|---|---|---|---|
| Democratic | Andrew Takuya Garrett | 3,781 | 57.42% |
| Democratic | Dale Kobayashi (incumbent) | 2,804 | 42.58% |
| Total votes | | 6,585 | 100% |

General election

Hawaii's 22nd House District general election, 2022
| Party | Candidate | Votes | % |
|---|---|---|---|
| Democratic | Andrew Takuya Garrett | 6,961 | 78.03% |
| Republican | Jeffrey H. Imamura | 1,960 | 21.97% |
| Total votes | | 8,921 | 100% |
| Democratic hold | | | |

=== District 23 ===
The new 23rd district includes the home of incumbent Democrat Scott Nishimoto, who had represented the 21st district since 2002. Nishimoto was automatically reelected without opposition, with no votes recorded.

Hawaii House of Representatives 23rd district general election, 2022
| Party | Candidate | Votes | % |
|---|---|---|---|
| Democratic | Scott Nishimoto (incumbent) | – | 100% |
| Total votes | | – | 100% |
| Democratic hold | | | |

=== District 24 ===
The new 24th district includes the home of incumbent Democrat Adrian Tam, who had represented the 22nd district since 2020. Tam was re-elected here.

Democratic primary

Hawaii's 24th House District Democratic primary election, 2022
| Party | Candidate | Votes | % |
|---|---|---|---|
| Democratic | Adrian Tam (incumbent) | 2,834 | 74.19% |
| Democratic | Ikaika M. Olds | 986 | 25.81% |
| Total votes | | 3,820 | 100% |

General election

Hawaii's 24th House District general election, 2022
| Party | Candidate | Votes | % |
|---|---|---|---|
| Democratic | Adrian Tam (incumbent) | 4,681 | 67.79% |
| Republican | Jillian T. Anderson | 2,224 | 32.21% |
| Total votes | | 6,905 | 100% |
| Democratic hold | | | |

=== District 25 ===
The new 25th district includes the home of incumbent Democratic House Speaker Scott Saiki, who had represented the 26th district since 1994. Saiki was re-elected here.

Democratic primary

Hawaii's 25th House District Democratic primary election, 2022
| Party | Candidate | Votes | % |
|---|---|---|---|
| Democratic | Scott Saiki (incumbent) | 2,680 | 51.55% |
| Democratic | Kim Coco Iwamoto | 2,519 | 48.45% |
| Total votes | | 5,199 | 100% |

General election

Hawaii's 25th House District general election, 2022
| Party | Candidate | Votes | % |
|---|---|---|---|
| Democratic | Scott Saiki (incumbent) | 5,473 | 73.37% |
| Republican | Rob Novak | 1,986 | 26.63% |
| Total votes | | 7,459 | 100% |
| Democratic hold | | | |

=== District 26 ===
The new 26th district includes the home of incumbent Democrat Della Au Belatti, who had represented the 24th district and its predecessors since 2006. Belatti was re-elected here.

Democratic primary

Hawaii's 26th House District Democratic primary election, 2022
| Party | Candidate | Votes | % |
|---|---|---|---|
| Democratic | Della Au Belatti (incumbent) | 2,897 | 56.75% |
| Democratic | Valerie C. Wang | 1,935 | 37.90% |
| Democratic | Kanzo Nara | 273 | 5.35% |
| Total votes | | 5,105 | 100% |

General election

Hawaii's 26th House District general election, 2022
| Party | Candidate | Votes | % |
|---|---|---|---|
| Democratic | Della Au Belatti (incumbent) | 5,465 | 71.80% |
| Republican | Charlotte Rosecrans | 2,146 | 28.20% |
| Total votes | | 7,611 | 100% |
| Democratic hold | | | |

=== District 27 ===
The new 27th district includes the home of incumbent Democrats Takashi Ohno, who had represented the 27th district since 2013, and Sylvia Luke, who had represented the 25th district and its predecessors since 1998. Luke retired to run for lieutenant governor, while Ohno did not seek re-election. Democrat Jenna Takenouchi won the open seat.

Democratic primary

Hawaii's 27th House District Democratic primary election, 2022
| Party | Candidate | Votes | % |
|---|---|---|---|
| Democratic | Jenna Takenouchi | 3,824 | 54.45% |
| Democratic | Gary Gill | 3,199 | 45.55% |
| Total votes | | 7,023 | 100% |

General election

Hawaii's 27th House District general election, 2022
| Party | Candidate | Votes | % |
|---|---|---|---|
| Democratic | Jenna Takenouchi | 6,925 | 71.61% |
| Republican | Margaret U. Lim | 2,746 | 28.39% |
| Total votes | | 9,671 | 100% |
| Democratic hold | | | |

=== District 28 ===
The new 28th district includes the home of incumbent Democrat Daniel Holt, who had represented the 29th district since 2016. Holt was re-elected here.

Democratic primary

Hawaii's 28th House District Democratic primary election, 2022
| Party | Candidate | Votes | % |
|---|---|---|---|
| Democratic | Daniel Holt (incumbent) | 1,768 | 71.03% |
| Democratic | Robert Mikala Armstrong | 531 | 21.33% |
| Democratic | Ken Farm | 190 | 7.63% |
| Total votes | | 2,489 | 100% |

General election

Hawaii's 28th House District general election, 2022
| Party | Candidate | Votes | % |
|---|---|---|---|
| Democratic | Daniel Holt (incumbent) | 3,056 | 74.30% |
| Aloha ʻĀina | Ernest Caravalho | 1,057 | 25.70% |
| Total votes | | 4,113 | 100% |
| Democratic hold | | | |

=== District 29 ===
The new 29th district includes the home of incumbent Democrat John Mizuno, who had represented the 28th district since 2006. Mizuno was re-elected here.

General election

Hawaii's 29th House District general election, 2022
| Party | Candidate | Votes | % |
|---|---|---|---|
| Democratic | John Mizuno (incumbent) | 3,258 | 67.05% |
| Republican | Carole Kauhiwai Kaapu | 1,601 | 32.95% |
| Total votes | | 4,859 | 100% |
| Democratic hold | | | |

=== District 30 ===
Incumbent Democrat Sonny Ganaden had represented the 30th district since 2020.

Democratic primary

Hawaii's 30th House District Democratic primary election, 2022
| Party | Candidate | Votes | % |
|---|---|---|---|
| Democratic | Sonny Ganaden (incumbent) | 990 | 43.42% |
| Democratic | Romy M. Cachola | 744 | 32.63% |
| Democratic | Shirley Ann L. Templo | 546 | 23.95% |
| Total votes | | 2,280 | 100% |

General election

Hawaii's 30th House District general election, 2022
| Party | Candidate | Votes | % |
|---|---|---|---|
| Democratic | Sonny Ganaden (incumbent) | 2,688 | 72.75% |
| Republican | Pualani Azinga | 1,007 | 27.25% |
| Total votes | | 3,695 | 100% |
| Democratic hold | | | |

=== District 31 ===
The new 31st district includes the home of incumbent Democrat Linda Ichiyama, who had represented the 32nd district and its predecessors since 2010. Ichiyama was automatically reelected here without opposition, with no votes recorded.

Hawaii House of Representatives 31st district general election, 2022
| Party | Candidate | Votes | % |
|---|---|---|---|
| Democratic | Linda Ichiyama (incumbent) | – | 100% |
| Total votes | | – | 100% |
| Democratic hold | | | |

=== District 32 ===
The new 32nd district includes the home of incumbent Democrat Aaron Ling Johanson, who had represented the 31st district and its predecessors since 2010. Johanson did not seek re-election, and fellow Democrat Micah Aiu won the open seat.

General election

Hawaii's 32nd House District general election, 2022
| Party | Candidate | Votes | % |
|---|---|---|---|
| Democratic | Micah Aiu | 3,780 | 51.68% |
| Republican | Garner M. Shimizu | 3,534 | 48.32% |
| Total votes | | 7,314 | 100% |
| Democratic hold | | | |

=== District 33 ===
Incumbent Democrat Sam Satoru Kong had represented the 33rd district since 2014. Satoru Kong was automatically reelected without opposition, with no votes recorded.

Democratic primary

Hawaii's 33rd House District Democratic primary election, 2022
| Party | Candidate | Votes | % |
|---|---|---|---|
| Democratic | Sam Satoru Kong (incumbent) | 4,931 | 64.07% |
| Democratic | Tracy Aaron Arakaki | 2,765 | 35.93% |
| Total votes | | 7,696 | 100% |

General election

Hawaii House of Representatives 33rd district general election, 2022
| Party | Candidate | Votes | % |
|---|---|---|---|
| Democratic | Sam Satoru Kong (incumbent) | – | 100% |
| Total votes | | – | 100% |
| Democratic hold | | | |

=== District 34 ===
The new 34th district includes the homes of incumbent Democrats Gregg Takayama, who had represented the 34th district since 2012, and Roy Takumi, who had represented the 35th district and its predecessors since 1992. Takumi lost re-nomination to Takayama, who was re-elected here.

Democratic primary

Hawaii's 34th House District Democratic primary election, 2022
| Party | Candidate | Votes | % |
|---|---|---|---|
| Democratic | Gregg Takayama (incumbent) | 3,998 | 66.46% |
| Democratic | Roy Takumi (incumbent) | 2,018 | 33.54% |
| Total votes | | 6,016 | 100% |

General election

Hawaii's 34th House District general election, 2022
| Party | Candidate | Votes | % |
|---|---|---|---|
| Democratic | Gregg Takayama (incumbent) | 6,513 | 73.50% |
| Republican | Theodene S. Allen | 2,348 | 26.50% |
| Total votes | | 8,861 | 100% |
| Democratic hold | | | |

=== District 35 ===
The new 35th district includes part of Honolulu County, including parts of Pearl City, Crestview, Waikele, and Waipahu. Democrat Cory Chun won the open seat.

Democratic primary

Hawaii's 35th House District Democratic primary election, 2022
| Party | Candidate | Votes | % |
|---|---|---|---|
| Democratic | Cory Chun | 1,175 | 29.34% |
| Democratic | Nathan H. Takeuchi | 1,167 | 29.14% |
| Democratic | Jolyn Garidan Prieto | 841 | 21.00% |
| Democratic | Inam Rahman | 822 | 20.52% |
| Total votes | | 4,005 | 100% |

General election

Hawaii's 35th House District general election, 2022
| Party | Candidate | Votes | % |
|---|---|---|---|
| Democratic | Cory Chun | 4,114 | 62.97% |
| Republican | Josiah P. Araki | 2,419 | 37.03% |
| Total votes | | 6,533 | 100% |
| Democratic win (new seat) | | | |

=== District 36 ===
The new 36th district includes the home of incumbent Democrat Henry Aquino, who had represented the 38th district and its predecessors since 2008. Aquino retired to run for the Hawaii Senate. Democrat Rachele Lamosao won the open seat.

Democratic primary

Hawaii's 36th House District Democratic primary election, 2022
| Party | Candidate | Votes | % |
|---|---|---|---|
| Democratic | Rachele Lamosao | 1,840 | 74.80% |
| Democratic | Maurice T. Morita | 620 | 25.20% |
| Total votes | | 2,460 | 100% |

General election

Hawaii's 36th House District general election, 2022
| Party | Candidate | Votes | % |
|---|---|---|---|
| Democratic | Rachele Lamosao | 3,071 | 75.86% |
| Republican | Veamoniti Lautaha | 977 | 24.14% |
| Total votes | | 4,048 | 100% |
| Democratic hold | | | |

=== District 37 ===
Incumbent Democrat Ryan Yamane had represented the 37th district since 2004.

Democratic primary

Hawaii's 37th House District Democratic primary election, 2022
| Party | Candidate | Votes | % |
|---|---|---|---|
| Democratic | Ryan Yamane (incumbent) | 5,996 | 89.84% |
| Democratic | Eric M. Sarrafian | 678 | 10.16% |
| Total votes | | 6,674 | 100% |

General election

Hawaii's 37th House District general election, 2022
| Party | Candidate | Votes | % |
|---|---|---|---|
| Democratic | Ryan Yamane (incumbent) | 7,340 | 65.69% |
| Republican | Jamie A. Detwiler | 3,833 | 34.31% |
| Total votes | | 11,173 | 100% |
| Democratic hold | | | |

=== District 38 ===
The new 38th district includes the homes of incumbent Republicans Val Okimoto, who had represented the 36th district since 2018, and Lauren Matsumoto, who had represented the 45th district since 2012. Okimoto retired to run for the Honolulu City Council, and Matsumoto was re-elected here.

General election

Hawaii's 38th House District general election, 2022
| Party | Candidate | Votes | % |
|---|---|---|---|
| Republican | Lauren Matsumoto (incumbent) | 6,975 | 67.02% |
| Democratic | Marilyn B. Lee | 3,432 | 32.98% |
| Total votes | | 10,407 | 100% |
| Republican hold | | | |

=== District 39 ===
Incumbent Democrat Luella Costales had represented the 39th district since her appointment on March 11, 2022. Costales did not seek re-election, and Republican Elijah Pierick won the open seat.

Democratic primary

Hawaii's 39th House District Democratic primary election, 2022
| Party | Candidate | Votes | % |
|---|---|---|---|
| Democratic | Corey Rosenlee | 1,630 | 47.40% |
| Democratic | Jamaica A. (Mai) Cullen | 1,142 | 33.21% |
| Democratic | Kevin Kupihea Wilson | 667 | 19.40% |
| Total votes | | 3,439 | 100% |

Republican primary

Hawaii's 39th House District Republican primary election, 2022
| Party | Candidate | Votes | % |
|---|---|---|---|
| Republican | Elijah Pierick | 853 | 60.07% |
| Republican | Austin Maglinti | 567 | 39.93% |
| Total votes | | 1,420 | 100% |

General election

Hawaii's 39th House District general election, 2022
| Party | Candidate | Votes | % |
|---|---|---|---|
| Republican | Elijah Pierick | 3,793 | 55.11% |
| Democratic | Corey Rosenlee | 3,089 | 44.89% |
| Total votes | | 6,882 | 100% |
| Republican gain from Democratic | | | |

=== District 40 ===
Incumbent Republican Bob McDermott had represented the 40th district since 2012. McDermott retired to run for the U.S. Senate, and Democrat Rose Martinez won the open seat.

Democratic primary

Hawaii's 40th House District Democratic primary election, 2022
| Party | Candidate | Votes | % |
|---|---|---|---|
| Democratic | Rose Martinez | 1,213 | 47.61% |
| Democratic | Julie K. Reyes Oda | 707 | 27.75% |
| Democratic | Wayne Kaululaau | 628 | 24.65% |
| Total votes | | 2,548 | 100% |

Republican primary

Hawaii's 40th House District Republican primary election, 2022
| Party | Candidate | Votes | % |
|---|---|---|---|
| Republican | Janie Gueso | 833 | 55.79% |
| Republican | Michael Starr | 660 | 44.21% |
| Total votes | | 1,493 | 100% |

General election

Hawaii's 40th House District general election, 2022
| Party | Candidate | Votes | % |
|---|---|---|---|
| Democratic | Rose Martinez | 3,096 | 51.63% |
| Republican | Janie Gueso | 2,901 | 48.37% |
| Total votes | | 5,997 | 100% |
| Democratic gain from Republican | | | |

=== District 41 ===
Incumbent Democrat Matthew LoPresti had represented the 41st district since 2020. LoPresti lost re-election to Republican David Alcos.

Republican primary

Hawaii's 41st House District Republican primary election, 2022
| Party | Candidate | Votes | % |
|---|---|---|---|
| Republican | David Alcos | 1,280 | 73.02% |
| Republican | Daniel P. "Dan" Wade | 473 | 26.98% |
| Total votes | | 1,753 | 100% |

General election

Hawaii's 41st House District general election, 2022
| Party | Candidate | Votes | % |
|---|---|---|---|
| Republican | David Alcos | 3,949 | 58.65% |
| Democratic | Matthew LoPresti (incumbent) | 2,784 | 41.35% |
| Total votes | | 6,733 | 100% |
| Republican gain from Democratic | | | |

=== District 42 ===
Incumbent Democrat Sharon Har had represented the 42nd district and its predecessors since 2006. Har lost re-election to Republican Diamond Garcia.

Democratic primary

Hawaii's 42nd House District Democratic primary election, 2022
| Party | Candidate | Votes | % |
|---|---|---|---|
| Democratic | Sharon Har (incumbent) | 1,257 | 41.32% |
| Democratic | Anthony Makana Paris | 960 | 31.56% |
| Democratic | Lori Goeas | 825 | 27.12% |
| Total votes | | 3,042 | 100% |

General election

Hawaii's 42nd House District general election, 2022
| Party | Candidate | Votes | % |
|---|---|---|---|
| Republican | Diamond Garcia | 3,350 | 52.83% |
| Democratic | Sharon Har (incumbent) | 2,991 | 47.17% |
| Total votes | | 6,341 | 100% |
| Republican gain from Democratic | | | |

=== District 43 ===
Incumbent Democrat Stacelynn Kehaulani Eli had represented the 43rd district since 2018. Eli lost re-election to Republican Kanani Souza.

Republican primary

Hawaii's 43rd House District Republican primary election, 2022
| Party | Candidate | Votes | % |
|---|---|---|---|
| Republican | Kanani Souza | 1,430 | 78.36% |
| Republican | Anna Odom | 395 | 21.64% |
| Total votes | | 1,825 | 100% |

General election

Hawaii's 43rd House District general election, 2022
| Party | Candidate | Votes | % |
|---|---|---|---|
| Republican | Kanani Souza | 4,013 | 55.46% |
| Democratic | Stacelynn Kehaulani Eli (incumbent) | 3,223 | 44.54% |
| Total votes | | 7,236 | 100% |
| Republican gain from Democratic | | | |

=== District 44 ===
The new 44th district includes part of Honolulu County, including Nānākuli, and had no incumbent. Democrat Darius Kila won the open seat.

Democratic primary

Hawaii's 44th House District Democratic primary election, 2022
| Party | Candidate | Votes | % |
|---|---|---|---|
| Democratic | Darius Kila | 1,767 | 76.33% |
| Democratic | Jonathan Lee | 548 | 23.67% |
| Total votes | | 2,315 | 100% |

General election

Hawaii's 44th House District general election, 2022
| Party | Candidate | Votes | % |
|---|---|---|---|
| Democratic | Darius Kila | 3,342 | 62.48% |
| Republican | Kimberly Kopetseg | 2,007 | 37.52% |
| Total votes | | 5,349 | 100% |
| Democratic win (new seat) | | | |

=== District 45 ===
The new 45th district includes the home of incumbent Democrat Cedric Gates, who had represented the 44th district since 2016. Gates was re-elected here.

Democratic primary

Hawaii's 45th House District Democratic primary election, 2022
| Party | Candidate | Votes | % |
|---|---|---|---|
| Democratic | Cedric Gates (incumbent) | 1,657 | 73.58% |
| Democratic | Jo Jordan | 595 | 26.42% |
| Total votes | | 2,252 | 100% |

Republican primary

Hawaii's 45th House District Republican primary election, 2022
| Party | Candidate | Votes | % |
|---|---|---|---|
| Republican | Tiana Wilbur | 411 | 35.13% |
| Republican | Cherie Kuualoha Oquendo | 406 | 34.70% |
| Republican | Maysana A. Aldeguer | 353 | 30.17% |
| Total votes | | 1,170 | 100% |

General election

Hawaii's 45th House District general election, 2022
| Party | Candidate | Votes | % |
|---|---|---|---|
| Democratic | Cedric Gates (incumbent) | 2,678 | 55.33% |
| Republican | Tiana Wilbur | 2,162 | 44.67% |
| Total votes | | 4,840 | 100% |
| Democratic hold | | | |

=== District 46 ===
Incumbent Democrat Amy Perruso had represented the 46th district since 2018.

Democratic primary

Hawaii's 46th House District Democratic primary election, 2022
| Party | Candidate | Votes | % |
|---|---|---|---|
| Democratic | Amy Perruso (incumbent) | 2,645 | 72.82% |
| Democratic | Cross Makani Crabbe | 987 | 27.18% |
| Total votes | | 3,632 | 100% |

General election

Hawaii's 46th House District general election, 2022
| Party | Candidate | Votes | % |
|---|---|---|---|
| Democratic | Amy Perruso (incumbent) | 4,394 | 62.63% |
| Republican | John E. Miller | 2,622 | 37.37% |
| Total votes | | 7,016 | 100% |
| Democratic hold | | | |

=== District 47 ===
Incumbent Democrat Sean Quinlan had represented the 46th district since 2016.

General election

Hawaii's 47th House District general election, 2022
| Party | Candidate | Votes | % |
|---|---|---|---|
| Democratic | Sean Quinlan (incumbent) | 3,543 | 56.77% |
| Republican | Mark Talaeai | 2,698 | 43.23% |
| Total votes | | 6,241 | 100% |
| Democratic hold | | | |

=== District 48 ===
Incumbent Democrat Lisa Kitagawa had represented the 48th district since 2018.

General election

Hawaii's 48th House District general election, 2022
| Party | Candidate | Votes | % |
|---|---|---|---|
| Democratic | Lisa Kitagawa (incumbent) | 7,094 | 71.44% |
| Republican | Wendell A. Elento | 2,836 | 28.56% |
| Total votes | | 9,930 | 100% |
| Democratic hold | | | |

=== District 49 ===
Incumbent Democrat Scot Matayoshi had represented the 49th district since 2018.

Democratic primary

Hawaii's 49th House District Democratic primary election, 2022
| Party | Candidate | Votes | % |
|---|---|---|---|
| Democratic | Scot Matayoshi (incumbent) | 4,995 | 83.92% |
| Democratic | Kana Naipo | 612 | 10.28% |
| Democratic | Shawn L. Richey | 345 | 5.80% |
| Total votes | | 5,952 | 100% |

General election

Hawaii's 49th House District general election, 2022
| Party | Candidate | Votes | % |
|---|---|---|---|
| Democratic | Scot Matayoshi (incumbent) | 6,837 | 74.02% |
| Republican | Kilomana Danner | 2,400 | 25.98% |
| Total votes | | 9,237 | 100% |
| Democratic hold | | | |

=== District 50 ===
Incumbent Democrat Patrick Branco had represented the 50th district since 2020. Branco retired to run for Congress. Democrat Natalia Hussey-Burdick won the open seat.

Democratic primary

Hawaii's 50th House District Democratic primary election, 2022
| Party | Candidate | Votes | % |
|---|---|---|---|
| Democratic | Natalia Hussey-Burdick | 3,088 | 48.38% |
| Democratic | Michael Lee | 2,845 | 44.57% |
| Democratic | Esera D.L. Vegas | 283 | 4.43% |
| Democratic | Toni C. Difante | 167 | 2.62% |
| Total votes | | 6,383 | 100% |

General election

Hawaii's 50th House District general election, 2022
| Party | Candidate | Votes | % |
|---|---|---|---|
| Democratic | Natalia Hussey-Burdick | 7,025 | 63.11% |
| Republican | Kathy Thurston | 4,106 | 36.89% |
| Total votes | | 11,131 | 100% |
| Democratic hold | | | |

=== District 51 ===
Incumbent Democrat Lisa Marten had represented the 51st district since 2020.

Democratic primary

Hawaii's 51st House District Democratic primary election, 2022
| Party | Candidate | Votes | % |
|---|---|---|---|
| Democratic | Lisa Marten (incumbent) | 4,507 | 81.06% |
| Democratic | Kaleo Kwan | 1,053 | 18.94% |
| Total votes | | 5,560 | 100% |

General election

Hawaii's 51st House District general election, 2022
| Party | Candidate | Votes | % |
|---|---|---|---|
| Democratic | Lisa Marten (incumbent) | 6,009 | 63.17% |
| Republican | Kukana Kama-Toth | 3,503 | 36.83% |
| Total votes | | 9,512 | 100% |
| Democratic hold | | | |
