= Natalia Hussey-Burdick =

American politician (born 1989)

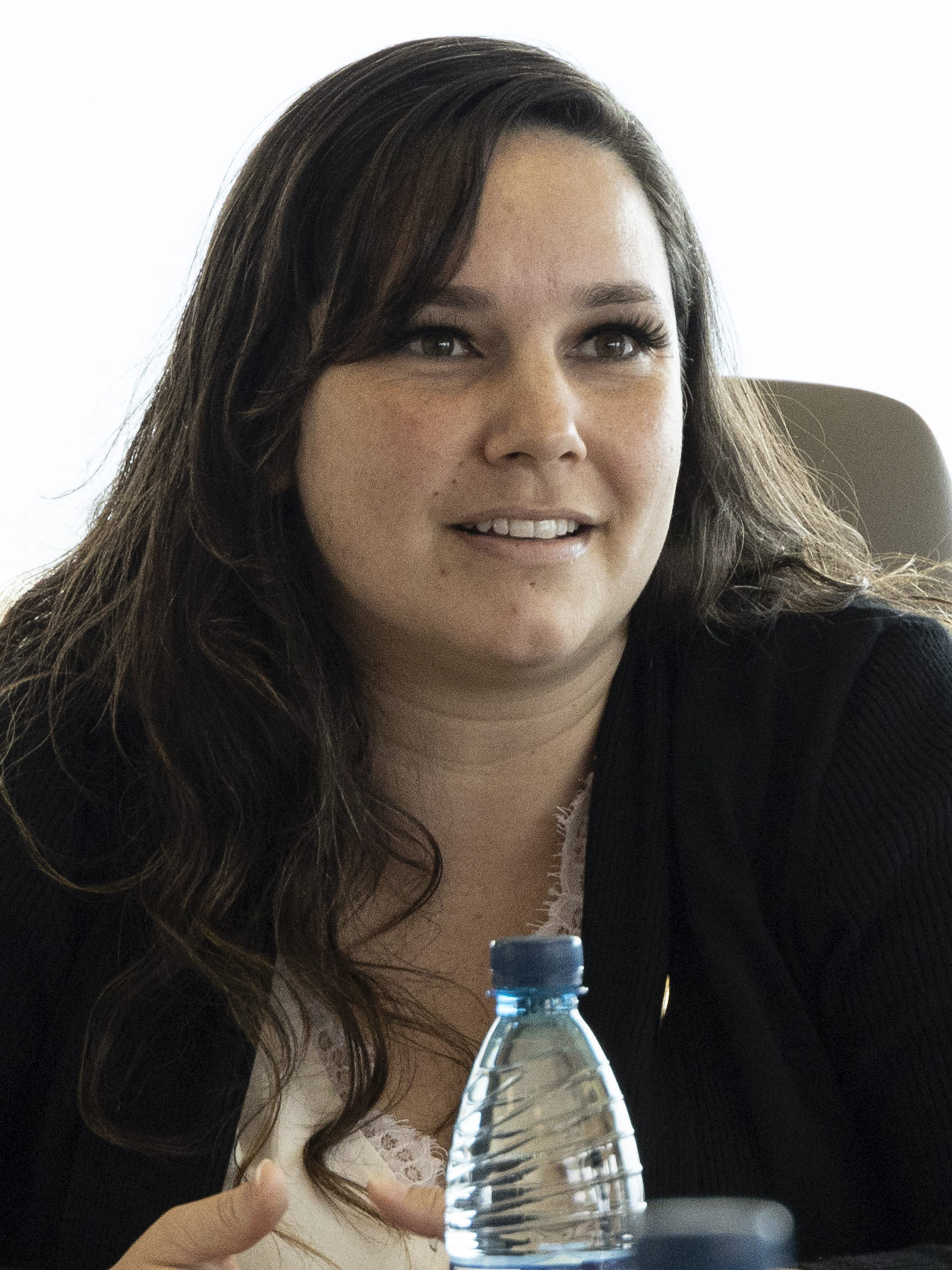

Member of the Hawaii House of Representatives from the 50th district
- In office November 8, 2022 – November 5, 2024
- Preceded by: Redistricted
- Succeeded by: Mike Lee

Personal details
- Born: December 2, 1989 (age 36) Kailua, Hawaii, U.S.
- Party: Democratic
- Relatives: Chris Burdick (uncle)
- Education: University of Hawaiʻi
- Profession: Politician, activist
- Website: Campaign website

Natalia Antonina Hussey-Burdick (née Burdick; born December 2, 1989) is an American politician and activist who was elected to succeed Patrick Branco as State Representative for District 50 in the Hawaii House of Representatives during the state's 2022 General Election. She lost reelection in 2024 in the primary against challenger Mike Lee.

== Education and early career ==
Hussey-Burdick graduated from the University of Hawaiʻi in 2016 with a B.A. in biology. She initially made plans to attend Medical School.

Before becoming a candidate for public office herself, Hussey-Burdick worked a legislative aide for Hawaii State Senator Laura Thielen and a Committee Clerk for the House Committee on Veterans and Military Affairs.

== Political career ==
In 2018, Hussey-Burdick launched her campaign to represent Hawaii's 49th House of Representatives District, entering a four-way primary election. She later lost the primary election, coming in second place with about 19 percent of the vote, paving the way for Scot Matayoshi to win the General election uncontested.

After her 2018 loss, she served as Office Manager to State Representative Tina Wildberger. In 2021, she was also confirmed as a member of the State Council Reapportionment Commission, which was responsible for Hawaii's redistricting process following the 2020 census. She also served as Secretary of the Hawaii Democratic Party from 2018 to 2020.

In 2022, Hussey-Burdick ran in Hawaii's 50th House District race to succeed Patrick Branco, who did not run for reelection to the state house in order to run for Congress in the 2022 midterm elections. Hussey-Burdick won a four-way primary election with less than 42 percent of the vote. She then went on to easily win the primary election against local political and businessowner Kathy Thurston with over 60 percent of the vote.

In April 2023, Hussey-Burdick was accused by several fellow legislators of allegedly trying to get them arrested for drunk driving in connection with a party held at the State Capitol; she later released a statement of apology.

In May 2023, Hussey-Burdick joined seven other members of the Hawaii House of Representatives in voting no on the state budget amidst criticism that it failed to appropriate funds to, among other things, the Hawaii Tourism Authority and the University of Hawaiʻi System. The budget was ultimately adopted by the House by a vote of 41-8.

Hussey-Burdick ran for reelection in 2024 but lost in the primary to Mike Lee.

== Electoral history ==
2018 Hawaii House of Representatives Election, District 49
| Party | Candidate | Votes | % |
|---|---|---|---|
| Democratic | Scot Matayoshi | 5,336 | 72.44 |
| Democratic | Natalia Hussey-Burdick | 1,393 | 18.91 |
| Democratic | Kaui Dalire | 324 | 4.40 |
| Democratic | Mo Radke | 313 | 4.25 |
| Total votes | | 7,366 | 100.0 |

2022 Hawaii House of Representatives Election, District 50
Primary election
| Party | Candidate | Votes | % |
|---|---|---|---|
| Democratic | Natalia Hussey-Burdick | 3,088 | 48.38 |
| Democratic | Michael Lee | 2,845 | 44.57 |
| Democratic | Esera D.L. Vegas | 283 | 4.43 |
| Democratic | Toni C. Difante | 167 | 2.62 |
| Total votes | | 6,383 | 100.00 |
General election
| Democratic | Natalia Hussey-Burdick | 6,997 | 63.14 |
| Republican | Kathy Thurston | 4,085 | 36.86 |
| Total votes | | 11,082 | 100.00 |
| Democratic hold | | | |
