= Darius Kila =

American politician

Member of the Hawaii House of Representatives from the 44th district
- Incumbent
- Assumed office November 8, 2022
- Preceded by: Constituency established

Personal details
- Born: 1995 or 1996 (age 30–31)
- Party: Democratic
- Education: Southern Oregon University
- Website: dariuskila.com

Darius K. Kila is an American politician serving in the Hawaii House of Representatives for the 44th district (Honokai Hale, Nanakuli, Maili). He won the seat in the 2022 election against Republican opponent Kimberly Kopetseg.

== Early life and education ==
Kila was born and raised on the leeward coast of Oahu. He graduated from Kapolei High School in 2013 and studied at Lane College in Jackson, Tennessee; Fullerton College in Fullerton, California; and Southern Oregon University in Ashland, Oregon.

== Career ==
Kila previously served as community liaison for Representative Stacelynn Kehaulani Eli, his predecessor in the Hawaii House of Representatives. He was also a member of the Nanakuli-Maili Neighborhood Board and advocate for the Council of Native Hawaiian Advancement.

In 2022, Kila was elected to the Hawaii House of Representatives District 44, which includes Honokai Hale, Nanakuli, and Maili, defeating Republican Kimberly Kopetseg.

In his first legislative session, Kila introduced a resolution that was successfully adopted by the state Legislature to form a working group to address Native Hawaiian intellectual property rights. Other legislative priorities include supporting Native Hawaiian and rural communities and kalo farmers.
