= Jenna Takenouchi =

American politician

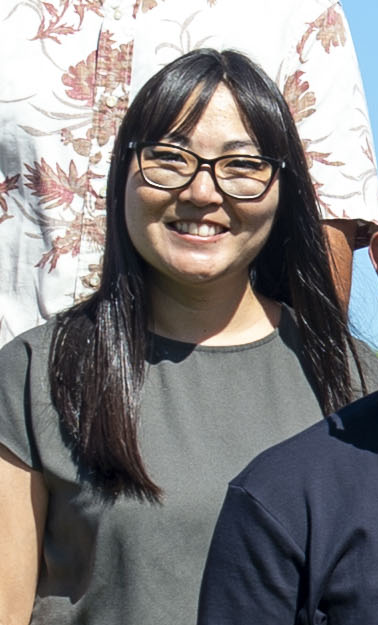
- Takenouchi in 2023

Member of the Hawaii House of Representatives from the 27th district
- Incumbent
- Assumed office November 8, 2022
- Preceded by: Redistricted

Personal details
- Born: 1983 or 1984 (age 42–43)
- Party: Democratic
- Education: University of Hawaiʻi at Mānoa (BA); Marshall School of Business (MMLIS)
- Website: jennatakenouchi.com

Jenna Wai Ying Chiyemi Takenouchi is an American politician serving in the Hawaii House of Representatives for the 27th district (Pacific Heights, Nu‘uanu, Liliha). She won the seat in the 2022 election against Republican opponent Margaret Lim.

== Early life and education ==
Takenouchi was raised in Pauoa, Hawaii and attended Pauoa Elementary School, Kawananakoa Middle School, and President Theodore Roosevelt High School. She earned a Bachelor of Arts in English from University of Hawaiʻi at Mānoa and a Master of Management in Library and Information Science from the University of Southern California Marshall School of Business.

== Career ==
For ten years, Takenouchi served as the office manager for Representative Takashi Ohno, her predecessor in the Hawaii House of Representatives. She previously worked as a communications specialist for public relations firms and as legislative aides to Representative Tom Brower and Senator Glenn Wakai.
