= Rose Martinez =

Filipino-born American politician from Hawaii

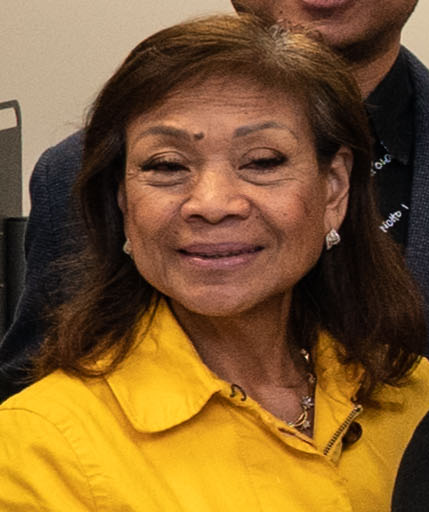
- Martinez in 2024

Member of the Hawaii House of Representatives from the 40th district
- In office November 8, 2022 – November 5, 2024
- Preceded by: Bob McDermott
- Succeeded by: Julie Reyes Oda

Personal details
- Born: June 22, 1958 (age 68) Urdaneta, Pangasinan, Philippines
- Party: Democratic
- Spouse: Flor
- Children: 1

Rosebella Locquiao Ellazar Martinez (born 22 June 1958) is a Filipino-born American politician and a former Democratic member of the Hawaii House of Representatives from 2022 to 2024, representing District 40. In 2018 and 2020, she was an unsuccessful Democratic candidate in the same district. She lost re-election in 2024 to Republican Julie Reyes Oda.

== Early life and career ==
Martinez was born in Bayaoas, Urdaneta City and moved to Hawaii in the 1980s. Professionally she is an educator and drug prevention counselor.

== Political career ==
Martinez is a candidate for District 20 in the 2026 Hawaii Senate election.
