= Cory Chun =

American politician

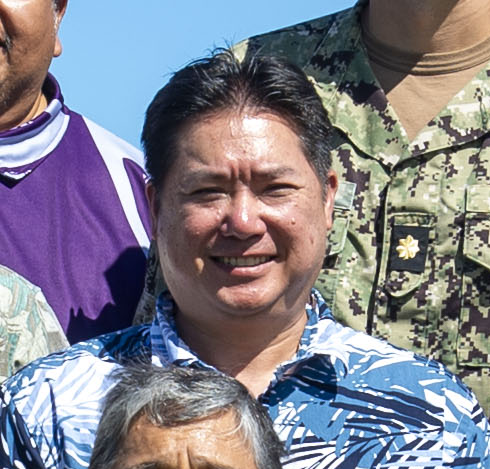

Member of the Hawaii House of Representatives from the 35th district
- Incumbent
- Assumed office November 8, 2022
- Preceded by: Redistricted

Personal details
- Born: 1977 or 1978 (age 47–48)
- Party: Democratic
- Education: Gonzaga University School of Law

Cory Michael Chiu Wah Chun is an American Democratic politician serving the 35th district on the Hawaii House of Representatives. He won the seat in the 2022 election against Republican opponent Josiah Araki.

== Career ==
Outside of the House, he has served on the Hawaii Disability Rights Center, the American Cancer Society Cancer Action Network, and Office of the Council Chair on the Honolulu City Council.

== Committees ==
He currently serves on three committees. He serves as the vice chair on the committee on Corrections, Military & Veterans. He also serves on the committee on Finance and the committee on Water & Land.
