= Mike Lee (Hawaii politician) =

American politician

Member of the Hawaii House of Representatives from the 50th district
- Incumbent
- Assumed office November 5, 2024
- Preceded by: Natalia Hussey-Burdick

Personal details
- Born: 1981 or 1982 (age 44–45)
- Party: Democratic

Michael Gee Kwong (Mike) Lee is an American politician serving as a member of the Hawaii House of Representatives for the 50th district since 2024, defeating incumbent Natalia Hussey-Burdick in the primary. He previously ran for the seat in 2022 but lost to Hussey-Burdick in the primary by 240 votes.

Lee graduated from Punahou School in 2000.
