= 2022 United States House of Representatives elections in Hawaii =

- November 8, 2022

Both Hawaii seats in the United States House of Representatives
- Turnout: 46.4% ▼16.9 pp
	Majority party	Minority party
Party	Democratic	Republican
Last election	2	0
Seats won	2	0
Seat change	Steady	Steady
Popular vote	271,953	124,091
Percentage	67.79%	30.93%
Swing	▲0.41%	▲1.45%

Democratic
60–70%
70–80%
80–90%

The 2022 United States House of Representatives elections in Hawaii were held on November 8, 2022, to elect the two U.S. representatives from the state of Hawaii, one from each of the state's two congressional districts. The elections coincided with other elections to the House of Representatives, elections to the United States Senate and various state and local elections.

There was a small swing towards both the Democratic and Republican party candidates as a result of a decreased field of third-party candidates. The only third-party candidate successfully nominated was Michelle Tippens of the Libertarian Party (United States). The Aloha ʻĀina Party focused instead on their campaign for Dan Decker for the 2022 United States' Senate Election. John Giuffre's American Shopping Party was not on the ballot following the State of Hawaii Office of Elections' proclamation to disqualify the party for not receiving the prerequisite support in the 2020 elections. While Giuffre nominated as an independent candidate, he did not receive sufficient support to appear on the ballot.

== Overview ==
=== District ===
Results of the 2022 United States House of Representatives elections in Hawaii by district:

District	Democratic		Republican		Others		Total		Result
District	Votes	%	Votes	%	Votes	%	Votes	%	Result
District 1	143,546	70.9%	51,217	25.3%	7,615	3.8%	202,378	100.00%	Democratic hold
District 2	128,407	59.2%	72,874	33.6%	15,704	7.2%	216,985	100.00%	Democratic hold
Total	271,953	64.8%	124,091	29.6%	23,319	5.6%	419,363	100.00%	

Popular vote
Democratic	64.8%
Republican	29.6%
Other	5.6%

House seats
Democratic	100.00%

== District 1 ==
2022 Hawaii's 1st congressional district election
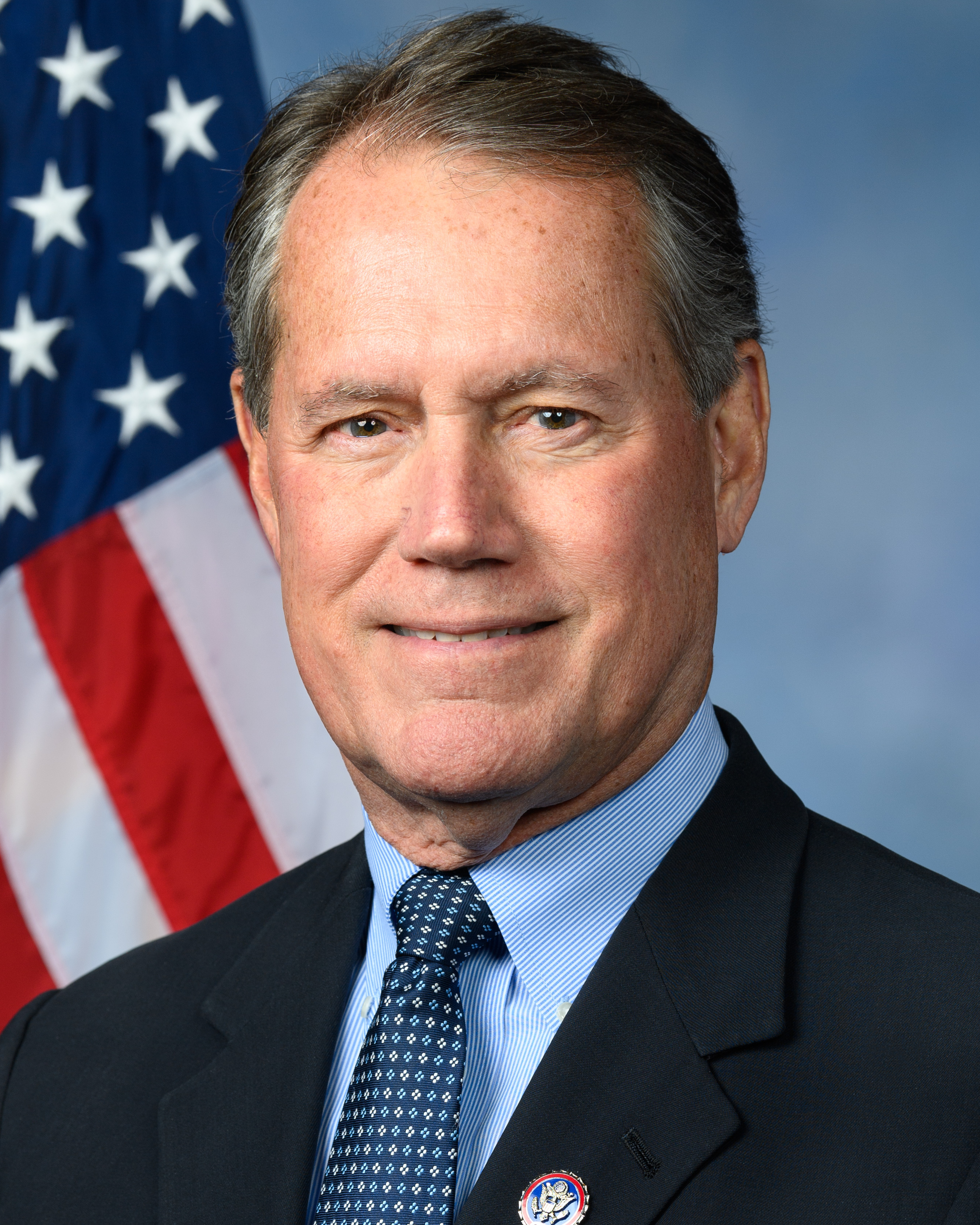

Nominee	Ed Case	Conrad Kress
Party	Democratic	Republican
Popular vote	143,546	51,217
Percentage	73.7%	26.3%
- Precinct results Case: 50–60% 60–70% 70–80% 80–90% No votes
U.S. Representative before election
Ed Case
Democratic
Elected U.S. Representative
Ed Case
Democratic

The 1st district is located entirely on the island of Oahu, centering on Honolulu and the towns of Aiea, Mililani, Pearl City, Waipahu and Waimalu. The incumbent was Democrat Ed Case, who was re-elected with 72.0% of the vote in 2020.

=== Democratic primary ===
==== Candidates ====
===== Nominee =====
- Ed Case, incumbent U.S. representative and co-chair of the Blue Dog Coalition

===== Eliminated in primary =====
- Sergio Alcubilla, attorney and former director of external relations at the Legal Aid Society of Hawaii

==== Endorsements ====
Sergio Alcubilla

State legislators

- Gary Hooser, former state senator (2002–2010)

Individuals

- Marianne Williamson, author and candidate for the Democratic nomination for President of the United States in 2020
Ed Case

Editorial boards

- Honolulu Star-Advertiser Editorial Board

Organization

- Planned Parenthood Action Fund

==== Polling ====
Poll source	Date(s) administered	Sample size (Note: Key: A – all adults RV – registered voters LV – likely voters V – unclear)	Margin of error	Ed Case	Sergio Alcubilla	Undecided
MRG Research	June 28–30, 2022	390 (LV)	± 5.0%	65%	8%	27%

==== Results ====
Democratic primary results
Party	Candidate	Votes	%
Democratic	Ed Case (incumbent)	100,667	83.2
Democratic	Sergio Alcubilla	20,364	16.8
Total votes		121,031	100.0

=== Republican primary ===
==== Candidates ====
===== Nominee =====
- Conrad Kress, former United States Navy SEAL

===== Eliminated in primary =====
- Patrick Largey, activist
- Arturo Reyes, perennial candidate

==== Results ====
Republican primary results
Party	Candidate	Votes	%
Republican	Conrad Kress	13,449	50.4
Republican	Arturo Reyes	7,465	28.0
Republican	Patrick Largey	5,785	21.7
Total votes		26,699	100.0

=== Nonpartisan primary ===
==== Candidates ====
===== Eliminated in primary =====
- Steven Abkin, construction manager and engineer (also running as Democrat)
- Calvin Griffin, perennial candidate

==== Failed to qualify ====
- Joseph Gilmore (write-in)

==== Results ====
Nonpartisan primary results
Party	Candidate	Votes	%
Nonpartisan	Calvin Griffin	270	53.6
Nonpartisan	Steven Abkin	234	46.4
Total votes		504	100.0

=== General election ===
==== Predictions ====
Source	Ranking	As of
The Cook Political Report	Solid D	February 7, 2022
Inside Elections	Solid D	March 18, 2022
Sabato's Crystal Ball	Safe D	February 2, 2022
Politico	Solid D	April 5, 2022
RCP	Safe D	June 9, 2022
Fox News	Solid D	July 11, 2022
DDHQ	Solid D	July 20, 2022
538	Solid D	June 30, 2022

==== Results ====
2022 Hawaii's 1st congressional district election
Party	Candidate	Votes	%
Democratic	Ed Case (incumbent)	143,546	73.7
Republican	Conrad Kress	51,217	26.3
Total votes		194,763	100.0
Democratic hold			

==== By county ====
County	Ed Case Democratic		Conrad Kress Republican		Margin		Total
County	#	%	#	%	#	%	Total
Honolulu (part)	143,546	73.7%	51,217	26.3%	92,329	47.4%	194,763

== District 2 ==
2022 Hawaii's 2nd congressional district election
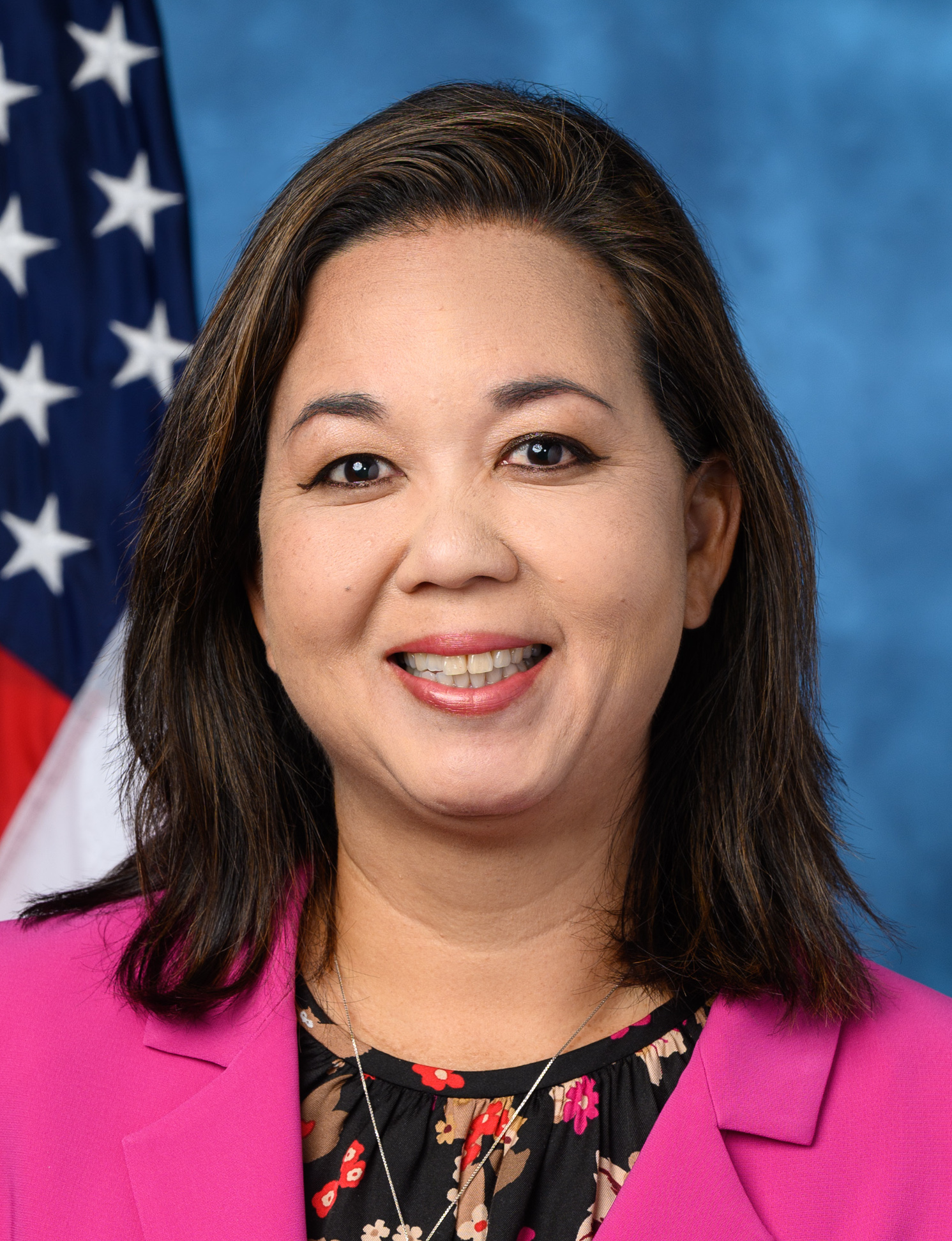

Nominee	Jill Tokuda	Joe Akana
Party	Democratic	Republican
Popular vote	128,407	72,874
Percentage	62.2%	35.3%
- Tokuda: 40–50% 50–60% 60–70% 70–80% 80–90% >90% Akana: 40–50% 50–60% 70–80% >90% Tie: 50% No votes
U.S. Representative before election
Kai Kahele
Democratic
Elected U.S. Representative
Jill Tokuda
Democratic

The 2nd district takes in rural and suburban Oahu, including Waimanalo Beach, Kailua, Kaneohe, Kahuku, Makaha, Nanakuli, as well as encompassing all the other islands of Hawaii, taking in Maui and Hilo. The incumbent was Democrat Kai Kahele, who was elected with 63.0% of the vote in 2020. He announced that he would run for Hawaii governor.

=== Democratic primary ===
==== Candidates ====
===== Nominee =====
- Jill Tokuda, former state senator and candidate for Lieutenant Governor of Hawaii in 2018 (previously filed to run for Lieutenant Governor)

===== Eliminated in primary =====
- Patrick Branco, state representative
- Nicole Gi, environmental engineer
- Brendan Schultz, humanitarian aid nonprofit founder
- Steven Sparks
- Kyle Yoshida, mechanical engineer

===== Declined =====
- Kai Kahele, incumbent U.S. Representative (running for governor)
- Jarrett Keohokalole, state senator (running for re-election)
- Tommy Waters, chair of the Honolulu City Council

==== Endorsements ====
Patrick Branco

Organizations

- Congressional Hispanic Caucus BOLD PAC
- Congressional LGBTQ+ Caucus Equality PAC
- LGBTQ Victory Fund
- New Politics
- VoteVets.org
Jill Tokuda

U.S. senators

- Mazie Hirono, U.S. senator from Hawaii (2013–present)
- Brian Schatz, U.S. senator from Hawaii (2012–present)

U.S. representatives

- Judy Chu, U.S. representative from CA-27 (2009–present)
- Pramila Jayapal, U.S. representative from WA-7 (2017–present)
- Kai Kahele, outgoing U.S. representative from HI-2 (2021–2023)
- Ted Lieu, U.S. representative from CA-33 (2015–present)
- Mark Pocan, U.S. representative from WI-2 (2013–present)
- Jamie Raskin, U.S. representative from MA-8 (2017–present)
- Brad Sherman, U.S. representative from CA-30 (1997–present)
- Mark Takano, U.S. representative from CA-41 (2013–present)

State legislators

- Adrian Tam, state representative from the 22nd district (2020–present)

Editorial boards

- Honolulu Star-Advertiser Editorial Board

Labor unions

- Hawaii Government Employees Association, AFSCME Local 152
- Hawaii International Association of Bridge, Structural, Ornamental and Reinforcing Iron Workers Local 625
- Hawaii State AFL-CIO
- Hawaii State Teachers Association
- International Brotherhood of Electrical Workers Local 1186
- International Union of Operating Engineers Local 3
- United Public Workers, AFSCME Local 646

Organizations

- Asian American Action Fund
- Congressional Progressive Caucus PAC
- EMILY's List
- League of Conservation Voters
- NARAL Pro-Choice America
- Planned Parenthood Action Fund

==== Polling ====
Poll source	Date(s) administered	Sample size	Margin of error	Patrick Branco	Jill Tokuda	Undecided
MRG Research	June 28–30, 2022	391 (LV)	± 5.0%	6%	31%	63%
OmniTrak (D) (Note: This poll was sponsored by Tokuda's campaign.)	May 9–25, 2022	500 (LV)	± 4.0%	7%	36%	57%

==== Results ====
Democratic primary results
Party	Candidate	Votes	%
Democratic	Jill Tokuda	62,275	57.6
Democratic	Patrick Branco	27,057	25.0
Democratic	Kyle Yoshida	6,624	6.1
Democratic	Brendan Schultz	6,115	5.7
Democratic	Nicole Gi	3,937	3.6
Democratic	Steven Sparks	2,137	2.0
Total votes		108,145	100.0

=== Republican primary ===
==== Candidates ====
===== Nominee =====
- Joe Akana, business development professional and nominee for this district in 2020

===== Eliminated in primary =====
- Joe Webster

==== Results ====
Republican primary results
Party	Candidate	Votes	%
Republican	Joe Akana	28,200	83.9
Republican	Joe Webster	5,403	16.1
Total votes		33,603	100.0

=== Libertarian Party ===
==== Nominee ====
- Michelle Tippens, U.S. Army veteran and perennial candidate

==== Results ====
Libertarian primary results
Party	Candidate	Votes	%
Libertarian	Michelle Rose Tippens	343	100.0
Total votes		343	100.0

=== Independents ===
==== Declared ====
- John "Raghu" Giuffre

==== Declined ====
- Charles Djou, former Republican U.S. representative for Hawaii's 1st congressional district (2010–2011) and candidate for Mayor of Honolulu in 2016

=== General election ===
==== Predictions ====
Source	Ranking	As of
The Cook Political Report	Solid D	February 7, 2022
Inside Elections	Solid D	March 18, 2022
Sabato's Crystal Ball	Safe D	February 2, 2022
Politico	Solid D	April 5, 2022
RCP	Safe D	June 9, 2022
Fox News	Solid D	July 11, 2022
DDHQ	Solid D	July 20, 2022
538	Solid D	June 30, 2022

==== Results ====
2022 Hawaii's 2nd congressional district election
Party	Candidate	Votes	%
Democratic	Jill Tokuda	128,407	62.2
Republican	Joe Akana	72,874	35.3
Libertarian	Michelle Tippens	5,130	2.5
Total votes		206,411	100.0
Democratic hold			

==== By county ====
County	Jill Tokuda Democratic		Joe Akana Republican		Various candidates Other parties		Margin		Total
County	#	%	#	%	#	%	#	%	Total
Hawaii	40,305	65.0%	19,981	32.2%	1,758	2.8%	20,324	32.8%	62,044
Honolulu (part)	42,449	58.7%	28,427	39.3%	1,496	2.1%	14,022	19.4%	72,372
Kauaʻi	14,547	64.5%	7,549	33.5%	462	2.0%	6,998	29.0%	22,558
Maui	31,106	62.9%	16,917	34.2%	1,414	2.9%	14,189	28.7%	49,437
Totals	128,407	62.2%	72,874	35.3%	5,130	2.5%	55,533	26.9%	206,411

== Notes ==
Partisan clients
