= Linda Ann Haʻi Clark =

American politician

Member of the Hawaii House of Representatives from the 13th district
- In office July 23, 2021 – November 8, 2022
- Appointed by: David Ige
- Preceded by: Lynn DeCoite
- Succeeded by: Mahina Poepoe

Personal details
- Party: Democratic

Linda Ann Haʻi Clark is an American politician who served as a member of the Hawaii House of Representatives from the 13th district. She was nominated to the House on July 23, 2021, by Governor David Ige and served until 2022, when she lost the election to Mahina Poepoe.

== Career ==
Outside of politics, Clark has worked as an independent process server for the Hawaii Child Support Enforcement Agency. She also operated the Kupono and Friends Day Care Center and was president of the Kaupo Community Association. Clark was appointed to the Hawaii House of Representatives in July 2021 by Governor David Ige. Clark served as vice chair of the House Higher Education & Technology Committee.
