= Matthew LoPresti =

American politician

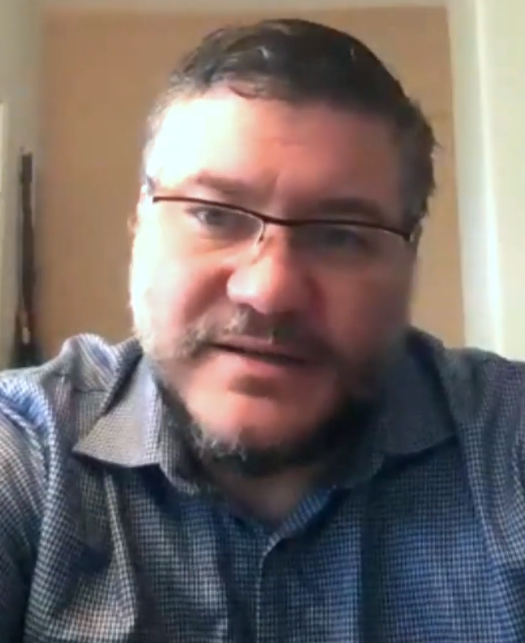

Member of the Hawaii House of Representatives from the 41st district
- In office 2020–2022
- Preceded by: Rida Cabanilla
- Succeeded by: David Alcos
- In office 2014–2018
- Preceded by: Rida Cabanilla
- Succeeded by: Rida Cabanilla

Personal details
- Party: Democratic
- Education: University of Toledo (BA, BA, MA); University of Hawaiʻi at Mānoa (PhD)
- Website: Legislature bio

Matthew S. LoPresti is an American politician who served as a member of the Hawaii House of Representatives for District 41 (Ewa, Ewa Beach, Ewa Gentry, Ewa Villages, Hoakalei, Ocean Pointe). He previously served from January 2015 to January 2019. He was a candidate for state Senate 19th district in 2018.

In January 2021, LoPresti helped found the bicameral Progressive Legislative Caucus and served as its chair.

He was defeated in the 2022 elections by Republican David Alcos.

== Education ==
LoPresti earned a Bachelor of Arts in philosophy, Bachelor of Arts in history, and Master of Arts in philosophy from the University of Toledo, followed by a PhD in philosophy from the University of Hawaiʻi at Mānoa.

== Career ==
LoPresti is an Associate Professor of Philosophy and Humanities at Hawai‘i Pacific University. He has taught in various capacities at the University of Hawaiʻi at Mānoa, Chaminade University, Kapiʻolani Community College, West Virginia University, University of Toledo, and Antioch College's Buddhist Studies Program in London, England and Bodhgaya, India. In 2020, he was invited to Jinan, China to present a speech to the Chinese Academy of Social Sciences entitled "Nurturing an Ecological Economy: a role for traditional Hawaiian and Chinese values."

LoPresti was elected to consecutive two-year terms on the executive committee of the Sierra Club's Oahu Group, where he served as Vice Chair. He was also elected to a two-year term on the ‘Ewa Neighborhood Board in 2011.

During the 2018 elections, LoPresti gained notice for a video recording depicting his tampering with an opponent's campaign flyer, for which he later apologized. In 2016 he filed a TRO against an opponent for removing his banners and harassment. The court approved the TRO.

In 2022, LoPresti served as Chair of the House Committee on Veterans, Military, & International Affairs, & Culture and the Arts. He was also a member of the O'ahu Metropolitan Planning Organization.

== Personal life ==
LoPresti was arrested for driving under the influence on 17 June 2022, by troopers near Ewa Beach. The charges were dismissed later that year, though prosecutors filed for an extension and in November a hearing was set for reconsideration of the dismissal.
