= Terez Amato =

American politician

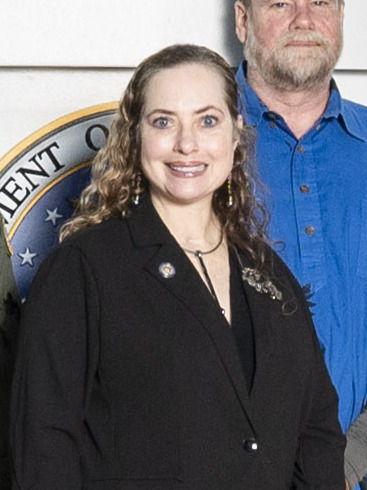
- Amato in 2024

Member of the Hawaii House of Representatives from the 11th district
- Incumbent
- Assumed office November 8, 2022
- Preceded by: Redistricted

Personal details
- Born: 1975 or 1976 (age 50–51)
- Party: Democratic
- Children: 4

Terez Marie Amato (née Lindsey) is an American politician serving in the Hawaii House of Representatives for the 11th district (Maalaea, Kihei, Wailea). She won the seat in the 2022 election against Republican opponent Shekinah Cantere. She was one of the six out LGBTQIA+ officials elected in Hawaii that year.

Amato has worked as a bookkeeper and small business owner.
