= David Alcos =

American politician

David Alcos III

Member of the Hawaii House of Representatives from the 41st district
- Incumbent
- Assumed office November 8, 2022
- Preceded by: Matthew LoPresti

Personal details
- Born: 1967 or 1968 (age 58–59) ʻEwa Beach, Hawaii, US
- Party: Republican
- Spouse: Ralena "Lena" Puanani Byrd Lee (m. 2002)
- Children: 2
- Website: Legislature bio

David Augustine Alcos III (born 1967 or 1968) is an American politician from the Hawaii Republican Party. He was first elected in 2022 to the Hawaii State House of Representatives from District 41.

== Early life and education ==
Alcos was born and raised in Ewa Beach with two sisters by parents David Jr. and Trudy. He attended Ewa Elementary and Ilima Intermediate, and graduated from James Campbell High School in 1987.

== Career and community involvement ==
Alcos became a construction worker after high school and later started his own company, D.A. Builders. He served as a football coach at his former high school, and has had membership in the Lions Club service organization and his neighborhood board.

== Political career ==
In 2020, Alcos ran an unsuccessful campaign to represent District 41 in the Hawaii House of Representatives, losing by less than 2 percent of the votes cast. He ran again in 2022 and won against the incumbent, 59% to 41%. Soon after taking office in November 2022, Alcos was chosen by Hawaii's House Republican Caucus to serve as assistant minority leader. Alcos was reelected 56% to 39% in 2024, after being fined $12,500 for not disclosing financial information. Alcos was not challenged in the 2026 Republican primary election or general election, so he was elected to another term outright.

== Personal life ==
Alcos married Ralena "Lena" Puanani Byrd Lee in 2002 and, according to his campaign site, has two children and two grandchildren. His paternal grandfather was born in the Philippines and worked as a boilerman at the Oahu Sugar Company's Waipahu mill. Per an obituary, Alcos' father also worked for the sugar company.
