= Patrick Branco =

American politician

- Branco in 2024

Member of the Hawaii House of Representatives from the 50th district
- In office November 3, 2020 – November 8, 2022
- Preceded by: Cynthia Thielen
- Succeeded by: Natalia Hussey-Burdick

Personal details
- Born: April 28, 1987 (age 39) Kailua, Hawaii, U.S.
- Party: Democratic
- Education: Hawaii Pacific University (BA); Johns Hopkins University (MIA)
- Website: Official website

Patrick Pihana Branco (born April 28, 1987) is an American lawmaker and a member of the Democratic Party who served as the State Representative for District 50 (Kailua and Kāne‘ohe Bay) on the island of Oʻahu. He was elected in November 2020 and served until the end of his term in November 2022.

Prior to his time in the Hawaiʻi State House of Representatives, Branco worked as a U.S. Diplomat in Colombia, Pakistan, Venezuela and Washington, D.C. He entered the U.S. Foreign Service through the Congressman Charles B. Rangel Graduate Fellowship program. He was the first Rangel Fellow from Hawaiʻi and the first Native Hawaiian selected for the program.

== Early life and career ==
Branco was born and raised in Kailua, Hawaii. He graduated from Kamehameha Schools in 2005 and then from Hawai‘i Pacific University, where he received a Bachelor of Arts in international relations and political science. He then studied Korean language at Sogang University in Seoul, where he completed a fellowship at LG Electronics Legal Foreign Affairs. Branco then studied at Johns Hopkins University School of Advanced International Studies, graduating with a Master of International Relations focusing on international economics and Korean studies.

Following his graduation from Johns Hopkins University in 2012, Branco joined the U.S. Foreign Service as a diplomat for seven years including assignments in Pakistan, Colombia and Venezuela. He also worked in the Office of the Special Representative for Afghanistan and Pakistan and the Secretary of State's Operations Center.

== Political career ==
Prior to elected office, Branco held multiple positions in community organizations. These include being on the Board of Directors for the AAPI Progressive Action, Board of Directors for the Conference on Asian Pacific American Leadership, vice-president of the Asian American Foreign Affairs Association, the Communications Chair of the Pickering & Rangel Fellows Association, a member of the Kailua Hawaiian Civic Club, a member of the Koʻolaupoko Hawaiian Civic Club, a member of the Royal Order of Kamehameha, a member of Hale ʻo Nā Aliʻi, and a member of the Chamber of Commerce Hawai‘i Young Professionals Program.

=== Elections ===
Branco ran for the Hawaiʻi House of Representatives in December 2019. He won against Republican Kanani Souza with 61.3% to her 38.7% of the vote.

=== 2022 U.S. House campaign ===
In May 2022, Branco announced he would run for the U.S. House of Representatives from Hawaii's 2nd congressional district. His campaign received endorsements from the Congressional Hispanic Caucus' Bold PAC and the Congressional Equality Caucus' Equality PAC. The primary election was noted for reaching a historic level of outside spending as spending against Tokuda or for Branco totaled $1.2 million coming from BOLD PAC, the Reid Hoffman-backed super PAC Mainstream Democrats PAC, VoteVets and the cryptocurrency industry-backed super PAC Web3 Forward.

Branco lost the primary election on August 13, 2022 to former state senator Jill Tokuda.

== Personal life ==
Branco is openly gay. He is of Portuguese, Filipino and Puerto Rican descent in addition to being Native Hawaiian.
