= Kanani Souza =

American politician

Member of the Hawaii House of Representatives from the 43rd district
- Incumbent
- Assumed office November 8, 2022
- Preceded by: Redistricted

Personal details
- Born: 1985 or 1986 (age 40–41)
- Party: Republican
- Education: University of Southern California (BA); Chaminade University (MEd); University of Hawaii (JD); Lewis & Clark Law School (LLM); University of Mississippi School of Law (LLM)

Kristen Kanani Souza is an American attorney and politician serving as a member of the Hawaii House of Representatives for the 43rd district, which encompasses Kapolei and Makakilo on the island of Oʻahu. A member of the Republican party, she assumed office in November 2022. She won the seat in the 2022 election against her Democratic opponent, former state representative Stacelynn Kehaulani Eli.

In 2026, Souza retained her seat in a court-ordered November redo election after her August primary ended in an exact tie decided against her by lot and subsequently invalidated by the Supreme Court of Hawaiʻi.

== Early life and education ==
Souza was raised in Kapolei, Hawaii. She attended Maryknoll School and graduated from Kamehameha Schools in 2003. She attended the University of Washington for two years before transferring to University of Southern California, where she earned a Bachelor of Arts in political science in 2007 and competed on the NCAA Division I rowing team. She earned a Master of Education in curriculum and instruction from Chaminade University of Honolulu in 2010.

Souza obtained her Juris Doctor from the William S. Richardson School of Law at the University of Hawaiʻi at Mānoa in 2013. She later completed two Master of Laws (LL.M.) degrees: one in environmental, natural resources, and energy law from Lewis & Clark Law School, and another in air and space law from the University of Mississippi School of Law.

== Career ==
Souza has worked as an attorney in private practice and as a lecturer at the University of Hawaiʻi at West Oʻahu. She has also worked as a deputy prosecuting attorney with the City and County of Honolulu.

=== Hawaii House of Representatives ===
Although Souza is officially a Republican, she has declined to participate in the minority caucus, opting to act independently and in a bipartisan manner.

==== 2026 election and tiebreaker dispute ====
In the August 8, 2026 Republican primary for District 43, Souza and challenger Sheila Medeiros finished in an exact 842–842 tie following a recount and the processing of cured ballots. Under Hawaiʻi Revised Statutes § 11-157, Chief Election Officer Scott Nago broke the tie by lot on August 15, drawing Medeiros's name from a lauhala basket and declaring her the winner.

Souza challenged the result before the Supreme Court of Hawaiʻi in Souza v. Nago after a reconciliation report showed two District 40 voters had mistakenly cast District 43 ballots. In September 2026, the court invalidated the August primary results, ruling that the out-of-district ballots made the tie unreliable and that the Office of Elections had improperly adopted its drawing procedure without formal rulemaking.

In the court-ordered November 3, 2026 redo election, Souza defeated Medeiros by 2,591 votes (51.0%) to 2,488 votes (49.0%).

== Personal life ==
Souza's brother, Keoni Souza, is a statewide elected official on the Office of Hawaiian Affairs Board of Trustees (first elected in 2022 and chosen as vice chair in 2024).
