= Rida Cabanilla =

American politician

- Cabanilla speaking in April 2019

Member of the Hawaii House of Representatives from the 41st district
- In office November 6, 2018 – November 3, 2020
- Preceded by: Matthew LoPresti
- Succeeded by: Matthew LoPresti
- In office November 6, 2012 – November 4, 2014
- Preceded by: Ty Cullen
- Succeeded by: Matthew LoPresti

Member of the Hawaii House of Representatives from the 42nd district
- In office November 2, 2004 – November 6, 2012
- Preceded by: Tulsi Gabbard
- Succeeded by: Sharon Har

Personal details
- Born: Rida T. R. Cabanilla Arakawa; December 24, 1952 (age 73) Ilocos Sur, Philippines
- Party: Republican, formerly a Democrat
- Education: University of Hawaiʻi (BS); United States Army Command and General Staff College

Military service
- Branch/service: United States Army Reserve
- Rank: Lieutenant Colonel

Rida T.R. Cabanilla Arakawa (born December 24, 1952) is an American politician who served as a Democratic member of the Hawaii House of Representatives from 2018 to 2020, representing District 41. Cabanilla also formerly represented District 41 in the House from 2012 to 2014 and District 42 from 2004 to 2012.

In 2020 she retired to run ussucessfully against Kurt Fevella in the Hawaii Senate.

In 2026 she became a Republican.

== Education ==
Cabanilla earned her Bachelor of Science in Nursing from the University of Hawaiʻi and attended the United States Army Command and General Staff College.

== Elections ==
- 2002 When Republican Representative Mark Moses was redistricted to District 40, Cabanilla sought the open District 42 seat in the four-way September 21, 2002 Democratic Primary, but took second to Tulsi Gabbard, who won the November 5, 2002 General election.
- 2004 Cabanilla won the four-way September 18, 2004 Democratic Primary with 1,463 votes (58.0%) against incumbent Representative Gabbard and two other candidates; Gabbard would go on to represent Hawaii's 2nd congressional district in the United States House of Representatives in 2013. Cabanilla won the November 2, 2004 General election with 4,148 votes (73.1%) against Republican nominee Trevor Koch, who had sought a seat in 2002.
- 2006 Cabanilla was unopposed for the September 26, 2006 Democratic Primary, winning with 1,979 votes, and won the November 7, 2006 General election with 2,757 votes (66.7%) against Republican nominee Norm Robert.
- 2008 Cabanilla won the three-way September 20, 2008 Democratic Primary with 1,111 votes (47.2%), and won the November 4, 2008 General election with 2,788 votes (48.9%) against Republican nominee Tom Berg.
- 2010 Cabanilla won the September 18, 2010 Democratic Primary with 1,535 votes (50.3%), and Berg was unopposed for the Republican Primary, setting up a rematch; Cabanilla won the November 2, 2010 General election with 2,790 votes (54.3%) against Berg.
- 2012 Redistricted to District 41, and with Democratic Representative Ty Cullen redistricted to District 39, Cabanilla won the August 11, 2012 Democratic Primary with 1,895 votes, and won the November 6, 2012 General election with 4,330 votes (57.7%) against Republican nominee Adam Reeder.
- 2014 Cabanilla lost the August 9, 2014 Democratic Primary to Matthew LoPresti with 1,208 votes (35.1%). Earlier that year, LoPresti had questioned Cabanilla's application for state grant-in-aid funds for a non-profit organization which she and her son are involved with.
- 2018 After LoPresti left for an unsuccessful run for State Senate District 19, Cabanilla regained the House District 41 seat, winning the August 11, 2018 Democratic Primary with 1,844 votes (48.1%) and the November 6, 2018 general election with 4,007 votes (50.3%) against Republican nominee Chris Fidelibus.
