= Andrew Takuya Garrett =

American politician

Member of the Hawaii House of Representatives from the 22nd district
- Incumbent
- Assumed office November 8, 2022
- Preceded by: Redistricted

Personal details
- Born: 1978 (age 47–48) Camp Zama, Japan
- Party: Democratic
- Education: University of Hawaiʻi at Mānoa
- Website: andrewtakuyagarrett.com

Andrew Takuya Garrett is an American politician serving in the Hawaii House of Representatives for the 22nd district (Manoa). He won the seat in the 2022 election against Republican opponent Jeffrey Imamura.

== Early life and education ==
Garrett moved to Mililani, Hawaii when he was 11 and graduated from Mililani High School. He earned a Bachelor of Arts in political science and a Master's in Public Administration from the University of Hawaiʻi at Mānoa.

== Career ==
Prior to being elected in 2022, Garrett served as the deputy director of the Hawaii State Department of Human Resources Development. Prior to that, he spent several years with the Healthcare Association of Hawaii as vice president of post-acute care.
