= Tina Wildberger =

American politician

Member of the Hawaii House of Representatives from the 11th District
- In office November 6, 2018 – November 8, 2022
- Preceded by: Kaniela Ing
- Succeeded by: Terez Amato

Personal details
- Party: Democratic
- Education: Georgia State University

Tina Wildberger is an American politician who is currently the Hawaii state representative in Hawaii's 11th district. She won the seat after incumbent Democrat Kaniela Ing decided to run for Hawaii's 1st congressional district in the United States House of Representatives. She won re-election in 2020 against Aloha ʻĀina Party candidate Howard Greenburg, 74.2% to 25.8%.

Wildberger had announced in April 2022 that she would not run for re-election in the 2022 Hawaii House of Representatives election, leaving office at the end of that term.
