= Dale Kobayashi =

American politician

Member of the Hawaii House of Representatives from the 23rd District
- In office November 6, 2018 – November 8, 2022
- Preceded by: Isaac Choy
- Succeeded by: Andrew Takuya Garrett

Personal details
- Party: Democratic
- Relatives: Ann Kobayashi (mother)
- Education: University of Southern California; Yale University

Dale Toshiaki Kobayashi is an American politician who served as the Hawaii state representative in Hawaii's 23rd district from 2018 to 2022.. He won the seat after incumbent Democrat Isaac Choy decided not to run for re–election in 2018. He defeated several Democratic candidates in the District 23 primaries and won unopposed in the general election. He ran for District 23 in 2016 as well, losing in a primary election to incumbent Isaac Choy.
