= Jill Tokuda =

American politician (born 1976)

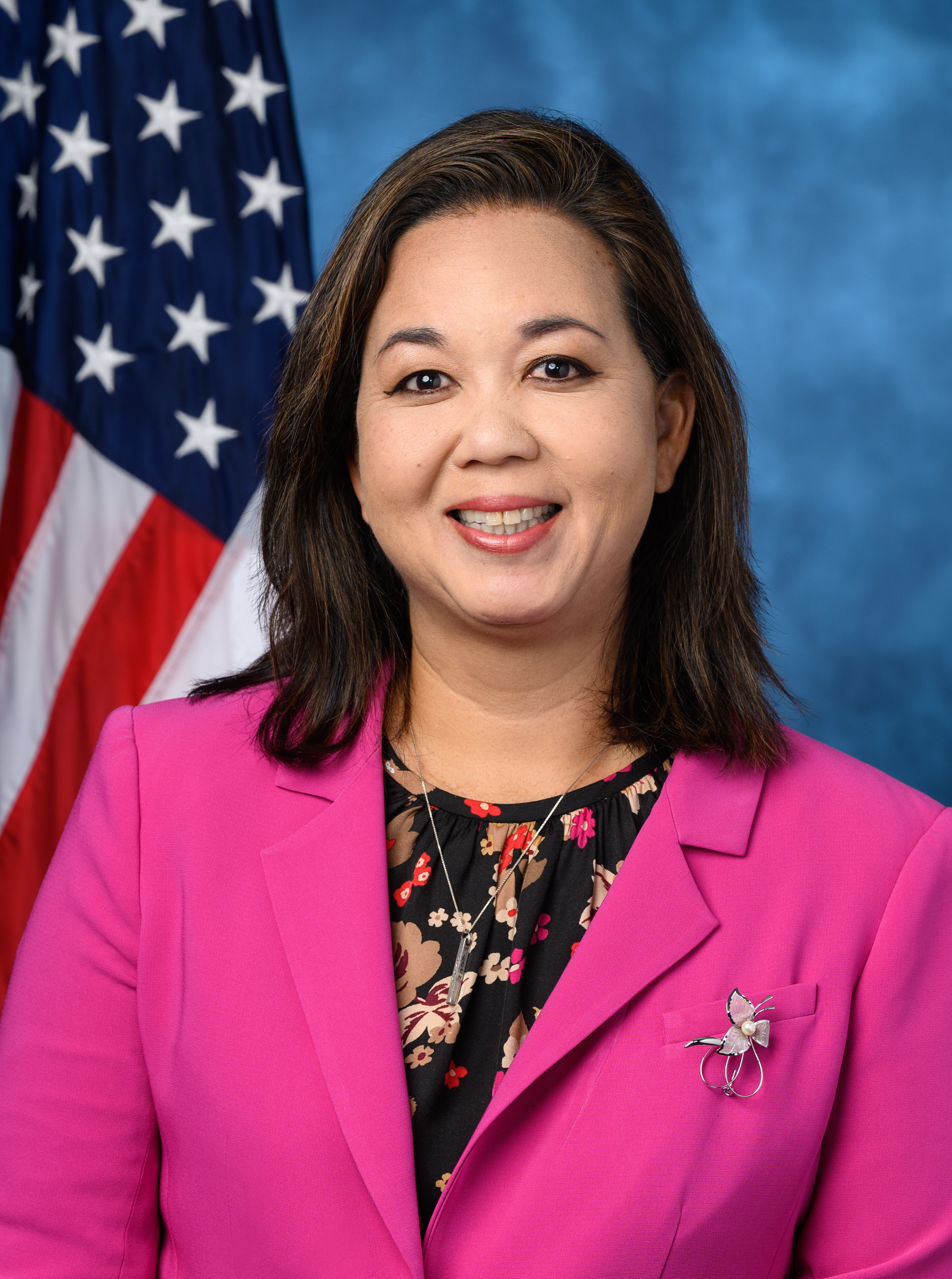
- Official portrait, 2023

Member of the U.S. House of Representatives from Hawaii's 2nd district
- Incumbent
- Assumed office January 3, 2023
- Preceded by: Kai Kahele

Member of the Hawaii Senate from the 24th district
- In office November 7, 2006 – November 6, 2018
- Preceded by: Bob Hogue
- Succeeded by: Jarrett Keohokalole

Personal details
- Born: March 3, 1976 (age 50) Kaneohe, Hawaii, U.S.
- Party: Democratic
- Spouse: Kyle Michibata
- Children: 2
- Education: George Washington University (BA)
- Website: House website Campaign website
- Tokuda's voice Tokuda on adequate health care access in rural communities. Recorded July 26, 2023

Jill Naomi Tokuda (born March 3, 1976) is an American politician and business owner serving since 2023 as the U.S. representative for Hawaii's 2nd congressional district.

As of 2026, Tokuda is one of four Japanese Americans who serve in the House of Representatives. A member of the Democratic Party, she represented the 24th district in the Hawaii Senate from 2006 to 2018.

== Background and education ==
Tokuda was born and raised in Kāneʻohe, Hawaiʻi. She went to local public schools, attending Kāneʻohe Elementary School and Governor Samuel Wilder King Intermediate School before graduating from James B. Castle High School. She is a fourth-generation Japanese American with Okinawan heritage.

Tokuda earned her BA in international relations with a minor in Japanese studies from George Washington University. While at GW, she was active in the College Democrats. She was a first-generation college student.

During the 2000 presidential election, Tokuda was listed as the Hawaii state co-chair of GoreNet. GoreNet was a young-Americans-focused group that supported the Al Gore 2000 presidential campaign with a focus on grassroots and online organizing as well as hosting small dollar donor events.

== Political career in Hawaiʻi ==
Tokuda was elected to the Hawaii Senate in 2006, running unopposed in the September 23 Democratic primary. She won the November 7 general election with 55.6% of the vote. In 2010, she was not challenged for renomination and was reelected in the November 2 general election with 56.4% of the vote. In 2014, Tokuda was again unopposed in the August 9 Democratic primary. She won the November 4 general election with 70.8% of the vote.

In the State Senate, Tokuda was Majority Whip and chaired the Ways and Means Committee overseeing the state budget. She also chaired of the Labor, Education, Higher Education, and Agriculture Committee and the Committee on Hawaiian Affairs. In the legislature, she successfully fought for expanded funding of preschool in the state.

In 2018, Tokuda ran for lieutenant governor of Hawaii rather than reelection to the State Senate. She lost the Democratic primary to Josh Green, who won the general election.

In 2019, Tokuda became executive director of the Nisei Veterans Memorial Center on Maui, a position she held until her election to Congress in 2022. She also served on the board of the Hawaii Budget and Policy Center and as co-director of CyberHawaii, an affiliate of CyberUSA, supporting workforce development in IT/cyber security/data science. During the COVID-19 pandemic, Tokuda advised the Hawaiʻi Data Collaborative and helped track the progress of federal relief spending.

== U.S. House of Representatives ==
=== Elections ===
==== 2022 ====
Tokuda won the Democratic primary for Hawaii's 2nd congressional district on August 14 after her opponent, Hawaiʻi State Representative Patrick Branco, received millions in outside spending funded by FTX's Sam Bankman-Fried, among others. She was endorsed in the primary by the Congressional Progressive Caucus.

In the November 8 general election, she defeated the Republican nominee with 62.2% of the vote.

==== 2024 ====
Tokuda was reelected on November 6, 2024. She faced no opposition in the Democratic primary.

=== Tenure ===
Upon her election to the House of Representatives, Tokuda became the third Japanese American serving in the chamber, along with Representatives Doris Matsui and Mark Takano, and the fourth in the United States Congress, alongside Senator Mazie Hirono.

During the 2023 Speaker election, Tokuda voted for Hakeem Jeffries for Speaker of the United States House of Representatives on all 15 ballots. She was appointed to three key House Committees for her district: Armed Services, Agriculture, and the Select Subcommittee on the Coronavirus Pandemic.

On April 26 Tokuda delivered a speech on the house floor congratulating RuPaul's Drag Race season 15 winner Sasha Colby. Colby is the first winner of the race originally from Hawaiʻi.

In 2023, Tokuda was among 56 Democrats to vote in favor of H.Con.Res. 21, which directed President Joe Biden to remove U.S. troops from Syria within 180 days.

In October 2023, after the 2023 Hawaii wildfires devastated the town of Lahaina in her district, Tokuda introduced the MAUI STRONG Act to help small businesses and nonprofits in the area survive. She also introduced the Natural Disaster Tax Relief Act to reduce tax burdens on those impacted by natural disasters.

Immediately after President Joe Biden withdrew from the 2024 presidential election, Tokuda endorsed Kamala Harris. She went on to serve as a member of the Japanese American leadership council supporting Harris's campaign.

=== Committee assignments ===
For the 119th Congress:

- Committee on Agriculture
  - Subcommittee on Conservation, Research, and Biotechnology (Ranking Member)
  - Subcommittee on Nutrition and Foreign Agriculture
- Committee on Armed Services
  - Subcommittee on Military Personnel
  - Subcommittee on Readiness

=== Caucus memberships ===
- Congressional Progressive Caucus
- Congressional Asian Pacific American Caucus, Co-chair
- Congressional Bipartisan Rural Health Caucus, Co-chair
- Congressional Ukraine Caucus
- Future Forum
- Congressional Taiwan Caucus
- Congressional Caucus for the Equal Rights Amendment
- Black Maternal Health Caucus
- Congressional Equality Caucus

== Political positions ==
=== Abortion rights ===
Tokuda is pro-choice. In 2023, she testified in favor of legislation in Hawaiʻi that would protect doctors who perform abortions in the state from legal repercussions for providing abortions to out-of-state patients. She is a co-founder of the Patsy T. Mink PAC, named after former Rep. Patsy Mink, which works to elect pro-choice Hawaiʻi Democratic women to office.

=== Locally grown food and food insecurity ===
Tokuda advocates for the increase the quantity and quality of locally grown food in food-insecure communities, a significant step for areas like Hawaiʻi, which face unique challenges in food production and access and has introduced the Grow Your Own Food Act.

=== Red Hill oversight ===
As a member of the House Armed Services Committee, Tokuda has taken a key role as a "powerful watchdog" providing oversight to the Navy's plan to clean up Red Hill Underground Fuel Storage Facility and its impact on Oahu's freshwater supply.

== Personal life ==
Tokuda is married to Kyle Michibata, also a graduate of James B. Castle High School in Kāneʻohe, Hawaiʻi. They have two sons, who attend public schools. Their household is multi-generational. She is yonsei Japanese American and a Protestant.

== See also ==
- List of Asian Americans and Pacific Islands Americans in the United States Congress
- Asian Americans in politics

U.S. House of Representatives
Preceded by Kai Kahele	Member of the U.S. House of Representatives from Hawaii's 2nd congressional district 2023–present	Incumbent
U.S. order of precedence (ceremonial)
Preceded by Shri Thanedar	United States representatives by seniority 352nd	Succeeded by Derrick Van Orden
