= Mahina Poepoe =

American politician

Member of the Hawaii House of Representatives from the 13th district
- Incumbent
- Assumed office November 8, 2022
- Preceded by: Redistricted

Personal details
- Born: 1987 or 1988 (age 38–39) Molokai, Hawaii
- Party: Democratic
- Education: University of Hawaiʻi at West Oʻahu

Mahinamalamalama M. (Mahina) Poepoe is an American politician serving in the Hawaii House of Representatives for the 13th district (Molokai, Lanai, Hana, Paia, Haiku). She won the seat in the 2022 election against Republican opponent Scott Adam and Green Party opponent Nick Nikhilananda.

Poepoe was born and raised on Molokai. She has worked as a legislative analyst for the Maui County Council and as vice president of the Molokai Community Health Center.
