= Richard Onishi =

American politician

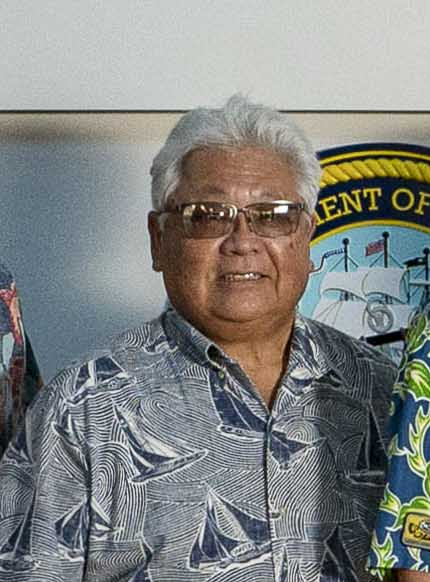
- Onishi in 2023

Member of the Hawaii House of Representatives
- Incumbent
- Assumed office November 6, 2012
- Preceded by: Constituency established
- Succeeded by: Sue Keohokapu-Lee Loy
- Constituency: 3rd District (2012–2022); 2nd District (2022–2024)

Personal details
- Born: May 3, 1954 (age 72) Hilo, Hawaii
- Party: Democratic
- Education: Honolulu Community College; University of Hawaii
- Website: friendsforrichardonishi.com

Richard Hiroyuki Keela Onishi (born May 3, 1954) is an American politician and a former Democratic member of the Hawaii House of Representatives from 2012 to 2024.

== Education ==
Onishi attended Honolulu Community College and earned his bachelor's degree in business administration from the University of Hawaii.

== Elections ==
- 2012 With Democratic Representative Clift Tsuji redistricted to District 2, Onishi won the District 3 August 11, 2012 Democratic Primary with 3,298 votes (56.2%), and won the three-way November 6, 2012 General election with 4,937 votes (54.8%) against Republican nominee Marlene Hapai and Libertarian candidate Frederick Fogel. who had both run for House seats in 2010.
