= Gregg Takayama =

American politician

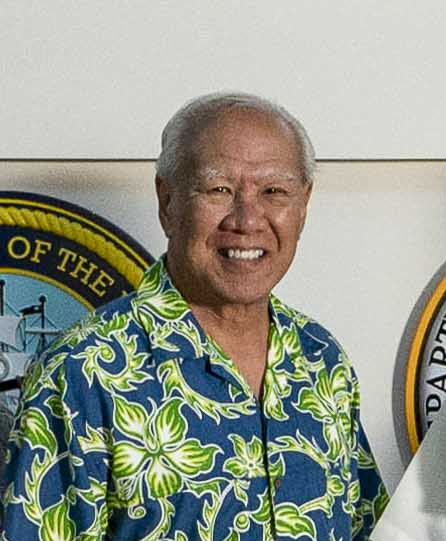
- Takayama in 2023

Member of the Hawaii House of Representatives from the 34th district
- Incumbent
- Assumed office November 6, 2012
- Preceded by: Mark Takai

Personal details
- Born: September 3, 1952 (age 74) Honolulu, Hawaii, U.S.
- Party: Democratic
- Spouse: Linda Chu Takayama
- Children: Teal Takayama, Sage Takayama, Kelly Jean Kikukawa Walker
- Education: University of Hawaiʻi
- Website: greggtakayama.com

Gregg T. Takayama (born September 3, 1952, in Honolulu, Hawaii) is an American politician and a Democratic member of the Hawaii House of Representatives since November 6, 2012, representing District 34.

== Education ==
Takayama earned his Bachelor of Arts in journalism from the University of Hawaiʻi at Mānoa.

== Elections ==
- 2012 with Democratic Representative Mark Takai redistricted to District 33, Takayama won the District 34 August 11, 2012, Democratic Primary with 3,359 votes (49.1%), and was unopposed for the November 6, 2012, General election.
- 2014, Takayama was unopposed in the Democratic Primary. Won the General election with 5,471 votes (60.5%).
