= Lynn DeCoite =

American politician

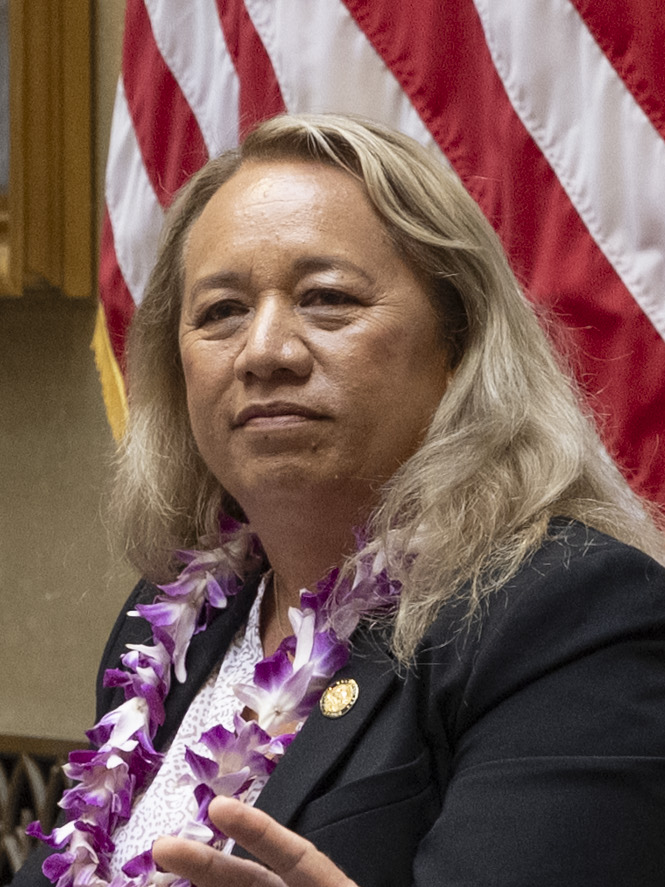

Member of the Hawaii Senate from the 7th district
- Incumbent
- Assumed office June 17, 2021
- Appointed by: David Ige
- Preceded by: J. Kalani English

Member of the Hawaii House of Representatives from the 13th district
- In office February 20, 2015 – June 17, 2021
- Appointed by: David Ige
- Preceded by: Mele Carroll
- Succeeded by: Linda Ann Ha’i Clark

Personal details
- Born: July 24, 1970 (age 56) Honolulu, Hawaii
- Party: Democratic
- Spouse: Russell DeCoite
- Education: University of Hawaiʻi Maui College

Lynn Pualani DeCoite (born July 24, 1970) is an American politician serving as a member of the Hawaii State Senate for District 7 since 2021. The district includes parts of western Maui and the islands of Molokai, Lanai and Kahoolawe. She previously served as a member of the Hawaii House of Representatives for District 13.

== Early life and career ==
DeCoite was born in Honolulu, Oahu and grew up on Molokai. She graduated from Molokai High School and the University of Hawaiʻi Maui College's Molokai campus. DeCoite is a third-generation homesteader.

A resident of Hoolehua on Molokai, DeCoite and her husband, Russell, own sweet potato businesses L&R Farm Enterprises and R.J.’s Snacks as well as cattle farm V-8 Ranch.

== Political career ==
She previously served on the Molokai Irrigation System Water Users Advisory Board. In April 2012, the Hawaii State Senate confirmed DeCoite to a four-year term on the Hawaii Board of Agriculture. She resigned from the state agriculture board after being appointed to the Hawaii House of Representatives in 2015.

=== Hawaii House of Representatives ===
DeCoite was appointed by Governor David Ige to represent the 13th district of the Hawaii House of Representatives in February 2015 following incumbent Mele Carroll’s resignation due to ill health.

==== Committees ====
DeCoitte was appointed to five House committees:

- Agriculture
- Economic Development & Business
- Finance
- Tourism
- Veterans, Military, & International Affairs, & Culture and the Arts

=== Hawaii State Senate ===
In June 2021, Ige appointed DeCoite to the Hawaii State Senate to succeed J. Kalani English, who resigned and was later convicted of felony honest services fraud.
