= Lisa Marten =

American politician

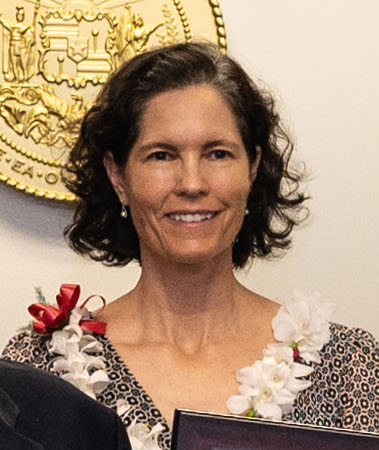
- Marten in 2024

Member of the Hawaii House of Representatives from the 51st District
- Incumbent
- Assumed office November 3, 2020
- Preceded by: Chris Lee

Personal details
- Born: February 5, 1967 (age 59)
- Party: Democratic
- Spouse: Jim
- Children: 2
- Education: Pitzer College and Waseda University (BA); Harvard University (MPP); Columbia University (DrPH)
- Website: www.capitol.hawaii.gov/memberpage.aspx?member=Marten&year=2022

Lisa Renee Marten Moonier (born February 5, 1967) is an American politician. Since 2020 she is the Democratic member of the Hawaii House of Representatives representing District 51.

== Career ==
She is the Chair of the Human Services committee and a member of the Health committee, Education committee, and the Higher Education and Technology committee. Marten is the Chair of the Keiki (children's) caucus and a member of the Hawaiian Caucus, the Women's Caucus, and the Kupuna (senior citizen) Caucus.

She founded and is Executive Director of the non-profit Healthy Climate Communities which educates youth on climate change and environmental issues and engages schools and community groups in native reforestation.
