= Stacelynn Kehaulani Eli =

American politician

Member of the Hawaii House of Representatives from the 43rd district
- In office November 6, 2018 – November 8, 2022
- Preceded by: Andria Tupola
- Succeeded by: Redistricted

Personal details
- Party: Democratic
- Education: University of Hawaiʻi at West Oʻahu
- Website: www.capitol.hawaii.gov/memberpage.aspx?member=Eli&year=2022

Stacelynn Kehaulani Eli is an American politician who was the Hawaii state representative in Hawaii's 43rd district from 2018 to 2022. She won the seat after incumbent Republican Andria Tupola decided to run for Governor of Hawaii. Her Republican opponent in the 2018 election, Sailau Timoteo, was disqualified from the general election ballot after it was discovered that she was not a United States citizen.

Eli's family has lived on the Nanakuli Homestead since the 1930s. A fifth-generation Nanakuli resident, she graduated from Nanakuli High and Intermediate School and has served on the Neighborhood Board and the board for the Nanakuli High and Intermediate Performing Arts Center.

Eli has also worked as a legislative aide for then-state Representative Lynn DeCoite (D, Lanai-Molokai-Paia-Hana), former state Senator Brickwood Galuteria (D, Kakaako-McCully-Waikiki), and former state Representative Karen Awana.
