= Scot Matayoshi =

American politician

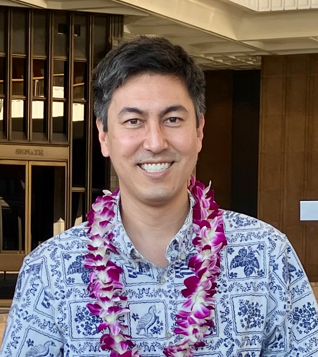
- Matayoshi in 2023

Member of the Hawaii House of Representatives from the 49th district
- Incumbent
- Assumed office November 6, 2018
- Preceded by: Ken Ito

Personal details
- Born: 1984 or 1985 (age 41–42)
- Party: Democratic
- Education: Claremont McKenna College (BA); University of Hawaiʻi at Mānoa (JD, MEd)

Scot Peter Zenko Matayoshi is an American attorney and politician serving as a member of the Hawaii House of Representatives from the 49th district. He assumed office on November 6, 2018.

== Education ==
Matayoshi earned a Bachelor of Arts degree in government from Claremont McKenna College, a Juris Doctor from the William S. Richardson School of Law, and a Master of Education from the University of Hawaiʻi at Mānoa.

== Career ==
Prior to entering politics, Matayoshi was an associate at McCorriston Miller Mukai Mackinnon and Schlack Ito in Honolulu. He was elected to the Hawaii House of Representatives in 2018, succeeding Ken Ito.
