= 2026 Hawaii House of Representatives election =

- November 3, 2026

All 51 seats in the Hawaii House of Representatives 26 seats needed for a majority
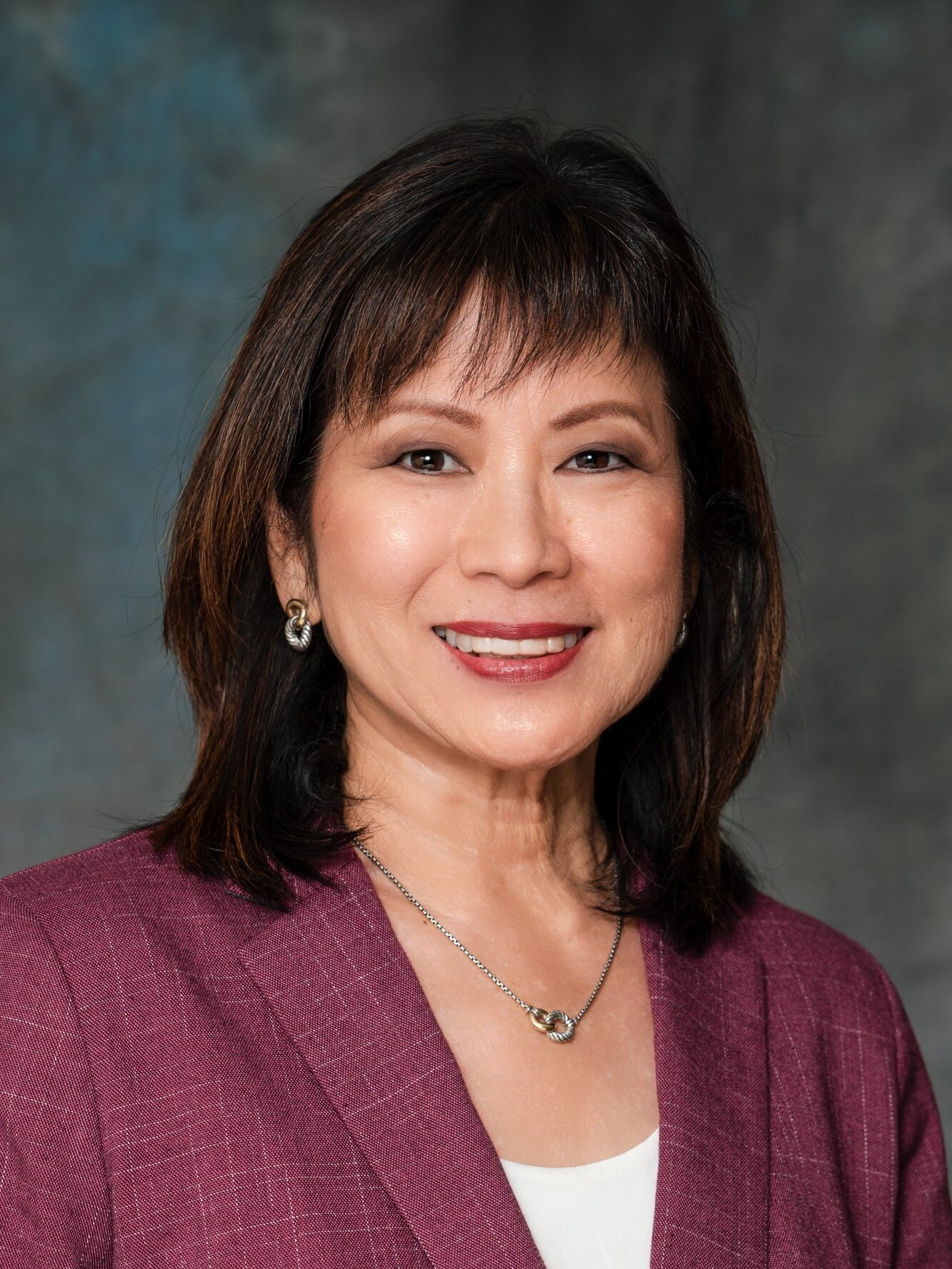

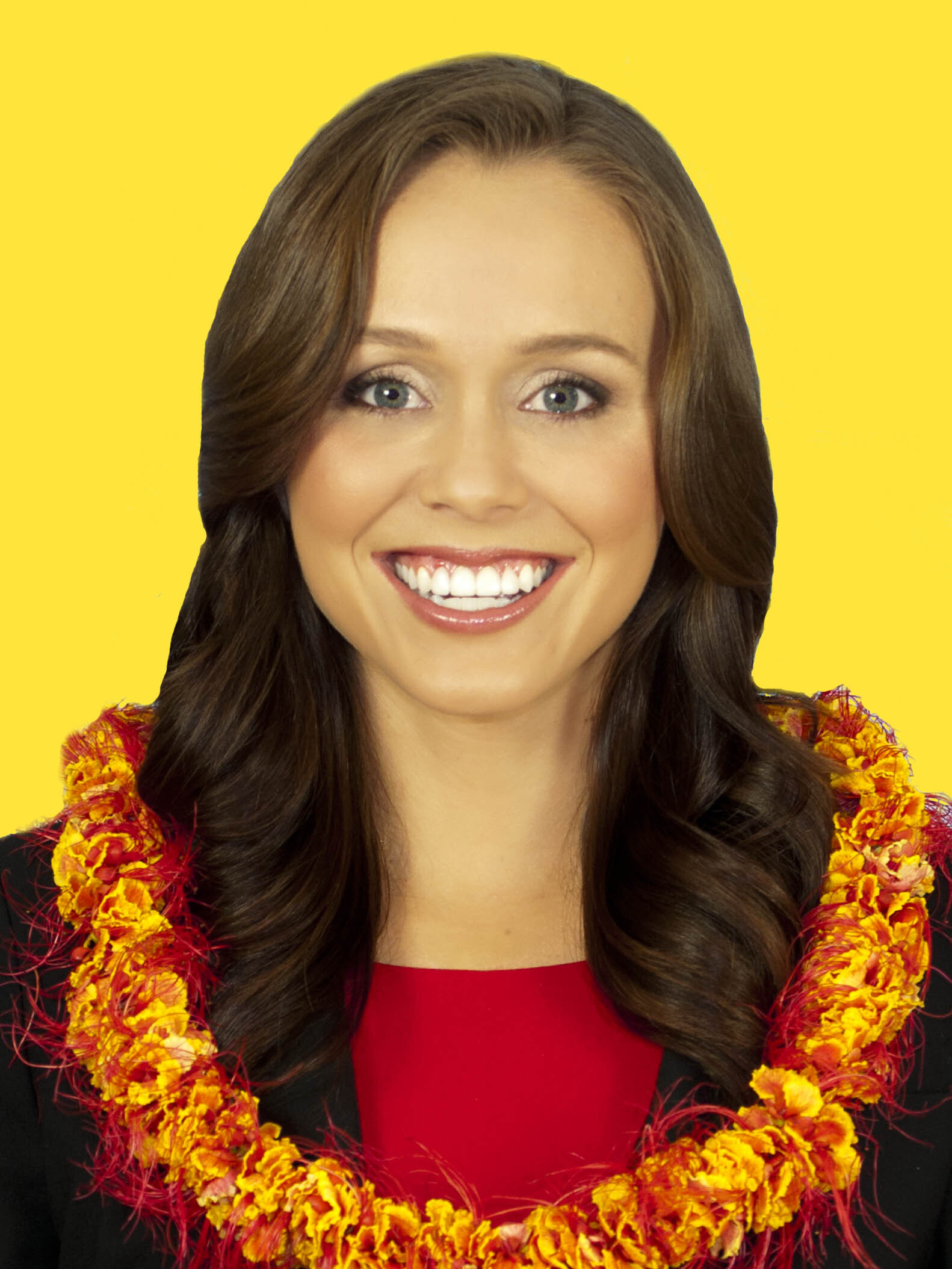

	Majority party	Minority party	Third party
Leader	Nadine Nakamura	Lauren Matsumoto	Pāʻele Kiakona
Party	Democratic	Republican	Green
Leader's seat	15th—Kapaʻa	38th—Mililani	14th—Western Maui
Last election	42 seats, 63.14%	9 seats, 35.81%	0 seats, 0.78%
Seats before	41	10	0
Seats won	44	6	1
Seat change	▲3	▼4	▲1
- Results by party Democratic hold Democratic gain Republican hold Green gain
Speaker before election
Nadine Nakamura
Democratic
Elected Speaker
Nadine Nakamura
Democratic

The 2026 Hawaii House of Representatives election was held on November 3, 2026, as part of the 2026 United States elections. All 51 seats in the Hawaii House of Representatives were elected.

Pāʻele Kiakona election as a Green candiate marked the first time a third party politician has been elected to the Hawaii State Legislature and the fifth time that a member of the Green Party had been elected to any state legislature.

== Background ==
State representatives in Hawaii represent an average of 28,630 residents as of the 2020 United States census. Democrats hold a supermajority in the chamber. However, Republicans gained three seats in the 2024 election, growing their caucus from 6 to 9 members.

On March 16, 2026, Representative Elle Cochran switched parties from Democratic to Republican, bringing the Republican caucus to 10 members, the first time their number reached double digits in more than twenty years.

The deadline to file for candidacy was June 2, 2026. Primary elections took place on August 8, 2026.

== Retirements ==
Three incumbents did not seek re-election.

=== Democrats ===
1. District 21: Jackson Sayama successfully ran for the Hawaii State Senate, Senate District 10.
2. District 26: Della Au Belatti ran for lieutenant governor.

=== Republicans ===
1. District 39: Elijah Pierick ran for the Hawaii State Senate, Senate District 19.

== Predictions ==
Source	Ranking	As of
Sabato's Crystal Ball	Safe D	January 22, 2026
State Navigate	Safe D	October 14, 2026

== Incumbents defeated ==
=== In Primary Election ===
==== Republican ====
1. District 43: Kanani Souza initially lost renomination to Sheila Medeiros. The primary election result was invalidated by the Supreme Court of Hawaii and a special general election was held between Medeiros and Souza concurrent with the regularly scheduled general election. As of November 5, 2026, Souza appears to have won reelection.

=== In General Election ===
==== Republicans ====
1. District 14: Elle Cochran was defeated by Green Pāʻele Kiakona.
2. District 18: Joe Gedeon was defeated by Democrat James Wataru.
3. District 32: Garner Shimizu was defeated by Democrat Micah Aiu.

==== Open seats parties flipped ====
1. District 39: Open seat currently held by Republican Elijah Pierick flipped to Democrat Corey Rosenlee.

== Results ==
=== By district ===
- †: Incumbent not running for reelection.
- ‡: Special election.

District	Incumbent	Party	Elected representative	Party
1	Matthias Kusch (Note: Appointed by Gov. Josh Green on August 30, 2024 after the death of Mark Nakashima and re-appointed on November 27 after Nakashima was posthumously re-elected in 2024.)	Dem	Matthias Kusch	Dem
2	Sue Lee Loy	Dem	Sue Lee Loy	Dem
3	Chris Toshiro Todd	Dem	Chris Toshiro Todd	Dem
4	Greggor Ilagan	Dem	Greggor Ilagan	Dem
5	Jeanné Kapela	Dem	Jeanné Kapela	Dem
6	Kirstin Kahaloa	Dem	Kirstin Kahaloa	Dem
7	Nicole Lowen	Dem	Nicole Lowen	Dem
8	David Tarnas	Dem	David Tarnas	Dem
9	Justin Woodson	Dem	Justin Woodson	Dem
10	Tyson Miyake	Dem	Tyson Miyake	Dem
11	Terez Amato	Dem	Terez Amato	Dem
12	Kyle Yamashita	Dem	Kyle Yamashita	Dem
13	Mahina Poepoe	Dem	Mahina Poepoe	Dem
14	Elle Cochran	Rep (Note: Initially elected as a Democrat, Elle Cochran switched party affiliation to Republican on March 16, 2026.)	Pāʻele Kiakona	Green
15	Nadine Nakamura	Dem	Nadine Nakamura	Dem
16	Luke Evslin	Dem	Luke Evslin	Dem
17	Dee Morikawa	Dem	Dee Morikawa	Dem
18	Joe Gedeon (Note: Appointed by Gov. Josh Green on May 28, 2025 to fill vacancy created by the resignation of Gene Ward.)	Rep	James Wataru	Dem
19	Mark Hashem	Dem	Mark Hashem	Dem
20	Tina Nakada Grandinetti	Dem	Tina Nakada Grandinetti	Dem
21	Jackson Sayama†	Dem	Derek Turbin	Dem
22	Andrew Takuya Garrett	Dem	Andrew Takuya Garrett	Dem
23	Ikaika Olds	Dem	Ikaika Olds	Dem
24	Adrian Tam	Dem	Adrian Tam	Dem
25	Kim Coco Iwamoto	Dem	Kim Coco Iwamoto	Dem
26	Della Au Belatti†	Dem	Ian Ross	Dem
27	Jenna Takenouchi	Dem	Jenna Takenouchi	Dem
28	Cov Ratcliffe (Note: Appointed by Gov. Josh Green on April 13, 2026, after Daniel Holt was appointed to the Hawaii Department of Land and Natural Resources.)	Dem	Cov Ratcliffe	Dem
29	Ikaika Hussey	Dem	Ikaika Hussey	Dem
30	Shirley Ann Templo	Dem	Shirley Ann Templo	Dem
31	Linda Ichiyama	Dem	Linda Ichiyama	Dem
32	Garner Shimizu	Rep	Micah Aiu	Dem
33	Sam Satoru Kong	Dem	Sam Satoru Kong	Dem
34	Gregg Takayama	Dem	Gregg Takayama	Dem
35	Cory Chun	Dem	Cory Chun	Dem
36	Daisy Hartsfield (Note: Appointed by Gov. Josh Green on January 12, 2026 to fill vacancy created by the appointment of Rachele Lamosao to the State Senate.)	Dem	Daisy Hartsfield	Dem
37	Trish La Chica	Dem	Trish La Chica	Dem
38	Lauren Matsumoto	Rep	Lauren Matsumoto	Rep
39	Elijah Pierick†	Rep	Corey Rosenlee	Dem
40	Julie Reyes Oda	Rep	Julie Reyes Oda	Rep
41	David Alcos	Rep	David Alcos	Rep
42	Diamond Garcia	Rep	Diamond Garcia	Rep
43	Kanani Souza‡	Rep	Kanani Souza	Rep
44	Darius Kila	Dem	Darius Kila	Dem
45	Chris Muraoka	Rep	Chris Muraoka	Rep
46	Amy Perruso	Dem	Amy Perruso	Dem
47	Sean Quinlan	Dem	Sean Quinlan	Dem
48	Lisa Kitagawa	Dem	Lisa Kitagawa	Dem
49	Scot Matayoshi	Dem	Scot Matayoshi	Dem
50	Mike Lee	Dem	Mike Lee	Dem
51	Lisa Marten	Dem	Lisa Marten	Dem

== Detailed results ==
Primary election results: (uncontested primary elections are not included below)

=== District 2 ===
District 2 Democratic primary election
Party	Candidate	Votes	%
Democratic	Sue Keohokapu Lee Loy (incumbent)	4,055	65.0
Democratic	Cristina (Tina) Holt	1,443	23.1
	Blank votes	693	11.1
	Over votes	2	0.00
Total votes		6,193	100%

=== District 3 ===
District 3 Democratic primary election
Party	Candidate	Votes	%
Democratic	Chris L.T. Todd (incumbent)	2,446	60.7
Democratic	Kuulei (Kiana) Keawekane	1,284	31.9
	Blank votes	225	5.6
	Over votes	2	0.00
Total votes		3,957	100%

=== District 4 ===
District 4 Democratic primary election
Party	Candidate	Votes	%
Democratic	Greggor Ilagan (incumbent)	2,468	62.5
Democratic	Tamlyn (Tam) Hunt	1,272	32.2
	Blank votes	128	3.2
	Over votes	3	0.1
Total votes		3,871	100%

=== District 5 ===
District 5 Democratic primary election
Party	Candidate	Votes	%
Democratic	Jeanne Kapela (incumbent)	2,706	63.9
Democratic	Matt Kaneali'i-Kleinfelder	1,183	27.9
	Blank votes	284	6.7
	Over votes	4	0.1
Total votes		4,177	100%

=== District 8 ===
District 8 Republican primary election
Party	Candidate	Votes	%
Republican	Monique Perreira	783	68.3
Republican	Hope Alohalani Cermelj	205	17.9
	Blank votes	111	9.7
	Over votes	2	0.2
Total votes		1,101	100%

=== District 10 ===
District 10 Democratic primary election
Party	Candidate	Votes	%
Democratic	Tyson K. Miyake (incumbent)	3,764	67.7
Democratic	Ki’i Kaho’ohanohano	1,219	21.9
	Blank votes	419	7.5
	Over votes	3	0.1
Total votes		5,405	100%

=== District 12 ===
District 12 Democratic primary election
Party	Candidate	Votes	%
Democratic	Kyle T. Yamashita (incumbent)	3,071	50.8
Democratic	Keoni Kuoha	2,477	41.0
	Blank votes	352	5.8
	Over votes	7	0.1
Total votes		5,907	100%

=== District 14 ===
General election results by precinct: Kiakona: 40–50%; 60–70%; Patel: 40–50%; 50–60%

District 14 Democratic primary election
Party	Candidate	Votes	%
Democratic	Sne Patel	995	31.5
Democratic	Ashley Olson	931	29.5
Democratic	Kanamu Balinbin	726	23.0
	Blank votes	375	11.9
	Over votes	3	0.1
Total votes		3,030	100%

=== District 17 ===
District 17 Democratic primary election
Party	Candidate	Votes	%
Democratic	Daynette (Dee) Morikawa (incumbent)	3,251	62.8
Democratic	Chad K. Schimmelfennig	1,268	24.5
	Blank votes	505	9.8
	Over votes	5	0.1
Total votes		5,029	100%

=== District 19 ===
District 19 Democratic primary election
Party	Candidate	Votes	%
Democratic	Mark Jun Hashem (incumbent)	4,161	52.1
Democratic	Kahi Pacarro	3,156	39.5
	Blank votes	554	6.9
	Over votes	1	0.0
Total votes		7,872	100%

=== District 21 ===
District 21 Democratic primary election
Party	Candidate	Votes	%
Democratic	Derek Turbin	2,638	41.9
Democratic	Jake Takaya Morrow	1,360	21.6
Democratic	Andrew Phomsouvanh	1,340	21.3
Democratic	Angie Knight	347	5.5
Democratic	Ranell Asuega-Fualaau	167	2.6
	Blank votes	329	5.2
	Over votes	8	0.1
Total votes		6,189	100%

=== District 24 ===
District 24 Democratic primary election
Party	Candidate	Votes	%
Democratic	Adrian Tam (incumbent)	3,061	79.3
Democratic	Bulla Eastman	452	11.7
	Blank votes	223	5.8
	Over votes	4	0.1
Total votes		3,740	100%

=== District 26 ===
District 26 Democratic primary election
Party	Candidate	Votes	%
Democratic	Ian M.A. Ross	2,017	39.0
Democratic	Nathan Kenichi Char	1,509	29.2
Democratic	Janel S. Fujinaka	742	14.4
Democratic	Arjuna Heim	421	8.1
	Blank votes	405	7.8
	Over votes	2	0.0
Total votes		5,096	100%

District 26 Republican primary election
Party	Candidate	Votes	%
Republican	Tony Silva	393	46.0
Republican	Robin C. (Robyn) McCreary	343	40.2
	Blank votes	68	8.0
	Over votes	0	0.0
Total votes		804	100%

=== District 28 ===
District 28 Democratic primary election
Party	Candidate	Votes	%
Democratic	Michael (Cov) Ratcliffe (incumbent)	732	27.1
Democratic	Nadia Alves	644	23.9
Democratic	Anthony A. (Tony) Nagatani	571	21.2
Democratic	Reno Abihai	252	9.3
Democratic	Ernest Caravalho	203	7.5
	Blank votes	199	7.4
	Over votes	5	0.2
Total votes		2,606	100%

=== District 29 ===
District 29 Democratic primary election
Party	Candidate	Votes	%
Democratic	Ikaika Hussey (incumbent)	1,398	47.6
Democratic	John M. Mizuno	1,361	46.3
	Blank votes	58	2.0
	Over votes	3	0.1
Total votes		2,820	100%

=== District 30 ===
District 30 Democratic primary election
Party	Candidate	Votes	%
Democratic	Shirley Ann Templo (incumbent)	1,192	62.4
Democratic	Kekoa O Pololu Kealoha	439	23.0
Democratic	Faatea S. Faatea	118	6.2
	Blank votes	65	3.4
	Over votes	0	0.0
Total votes		1,814	100%

District 30 Republican primary election
Party	Candidate	Votes	%
Republican	Amanda Ybanez	220	41.3
Republican	Angela Melody Young	180	33.8
	Blank votes	40	7.5
	Over votes	0	0.0
Total votes		440	100%

=== District 36 ===
District 36 Democratic primary election
Party	Candidate	Votes	%
Democratic	Daisy Balais Hartsfield (incumbent)	988	43.5
Democratic	Eric C. Barsatan	736	32.4
Democratic	Maurice Morita	350	15.4
	Blank votes	107	4.7
	Over votes	4	0.2
Total votes		2,185	100%

=== District 37 ===
District 37 Democratic primary election
Party	Candidate	Votes	%
Democratic	Trish La Chica (incumbent)	5,043	43.5
Democratic	Trevor T. Nagamine	1,180	17.2
	Blank votes	557	8.1
	Over votes	2	0.0
Total votes		6,782	100%

=== District 39 ===
District 39 Democratic primary election
Party	Candidate	Votes	%
Democratic	Corey Rosenlee	2,186	57.8
Democratic	Loren Keola Doctolero	1,303	34.4
	Blank votes	210	5.5
	Over votes	2	0.1
Total votes		3,701	100%

District 39 Republican primary election
Party	Candidate	Votes	%
Republican	Daniel (Danny) DeGracia	776	55.2
Republican	Wayne Kaiwi	474	33.7
	Blank votes	87	6.2
	Over votes	0	0.0
Total votes		1,337	100%

=== District 43 ===
Incumbent Kanani Souza and challenger Sheila Medeiros tied in the Republican primary election, leading the Hawaii Office of Elections to draw lots from a basket and ultimately declare Medeiros the winner. As no Democratic candidate had filed for the general election, Medeiros was seen as likely to be elected to the seat. However, Souza sued to challenge the result after two voters who did not live in the district were mistakenly given ballots for the race. On September 4, the Supreme Court of Hawaii invalidated the Office of Elections' lots procedure and ruled that a special general election between Medeiros and Souza will be held concurrent with the regularly scheduled general election to determine the district's representative. On September 9, Medeiros filed a request for the court to reconsider its ruling. The special election was held on November 3, in which Souza won by about 100 votes.

District 43 Republican primary election
Party	Candidate	Votes	%
Republican	Sheila Medeiros	842	45.6
Republican	Kanani Souza (incumbent)	842	45.6
	Blank votes	35	1.9
	Over votes	3	0.2
Total votes		1,722	100%

District 43 Republican primary election recount
Party	Candidate	Votes	%
Republican	Kanani Souza (incumbent)	841	50.03
Republican	Sheila Medeiros	840	49.97
	Blank votes	35	1.9
	Over votes	3	0.2
Total votes		1,719	100%

=== District 44 ===
District 44 Democratic primary election
Party	Candidate	Votes	%
Democratic	Darius K. Kila (incumbent)	1,760	82.0
Democratic	Michael P. Kahikina	228	10.6
	Blank votes	75	3.5
	Over votes	1	0.0
Total votes		2,064	100%

=== District 46 ===
District 46 Republican primary election
Party	Candidate	Votes	%
Republican	Daniel Michael Gabriel	800	64.7
Republican	Rocklin Youngstrom	247	20.0
	Blank votes	122	9.9
	Over votes	1	0.1
Total votes		1,170	100%

=== District 51 ===
District 51 Democratic primary election
Party	Candidate	Votes	%
Democratic	Lisa Marten (incumbent)	3,387	64.5
Democratic	Micah C.K. Kalama	1,342	25.6
Democratic	Steve Haumschild	253	4.8
	Blank votes	141	2.7
	Over votes	6	0.1
Total votes		5,129	100%

== See also ==
- Elections in Hawaii
- List of Hawaii state legislatures
