= Elle Cochran =

American politician

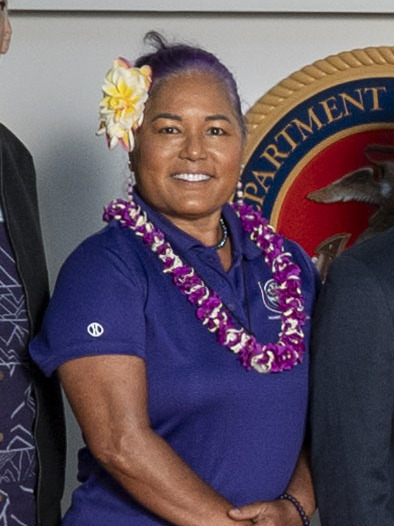
- Cochran in 2024

Member of the Hawaii House of Representatives from the 14th district
- In office November 8, 2022 – November 3, 2026
- Preceded by: Redistricted
- Succeeded by: Pāʻele Kiakona

Member of the Maui County Council for West Maui
- In office 2011–2018

Personal details
- Born: 1964 or 1965 (age 61–62) Wailuku, Hawaii, US
- Party: Republican (2026–present); Democratic (2022–2026)
- Spouse: Wayne A. Cochran

Eleanora Kellett "Elle" Cochran is an American politician who served in the Hawaii House of Representatives representing the 14th district, which includes the areas of Wai'ehu, Waihe'e, Kahakuloa, Honokahua, Kahana, Mahinahina Camp, Ka'anapali, Lahaina, Lahainaluna, Olowalu and portions of Ma'alaea. She won the seat in the 2022 election as the Democratic nominee, but defected to the Republican Party in 2026. She lost her seat to Green Party candidate Pāʻele Kiakona in the 2026 general election.

== Career ==
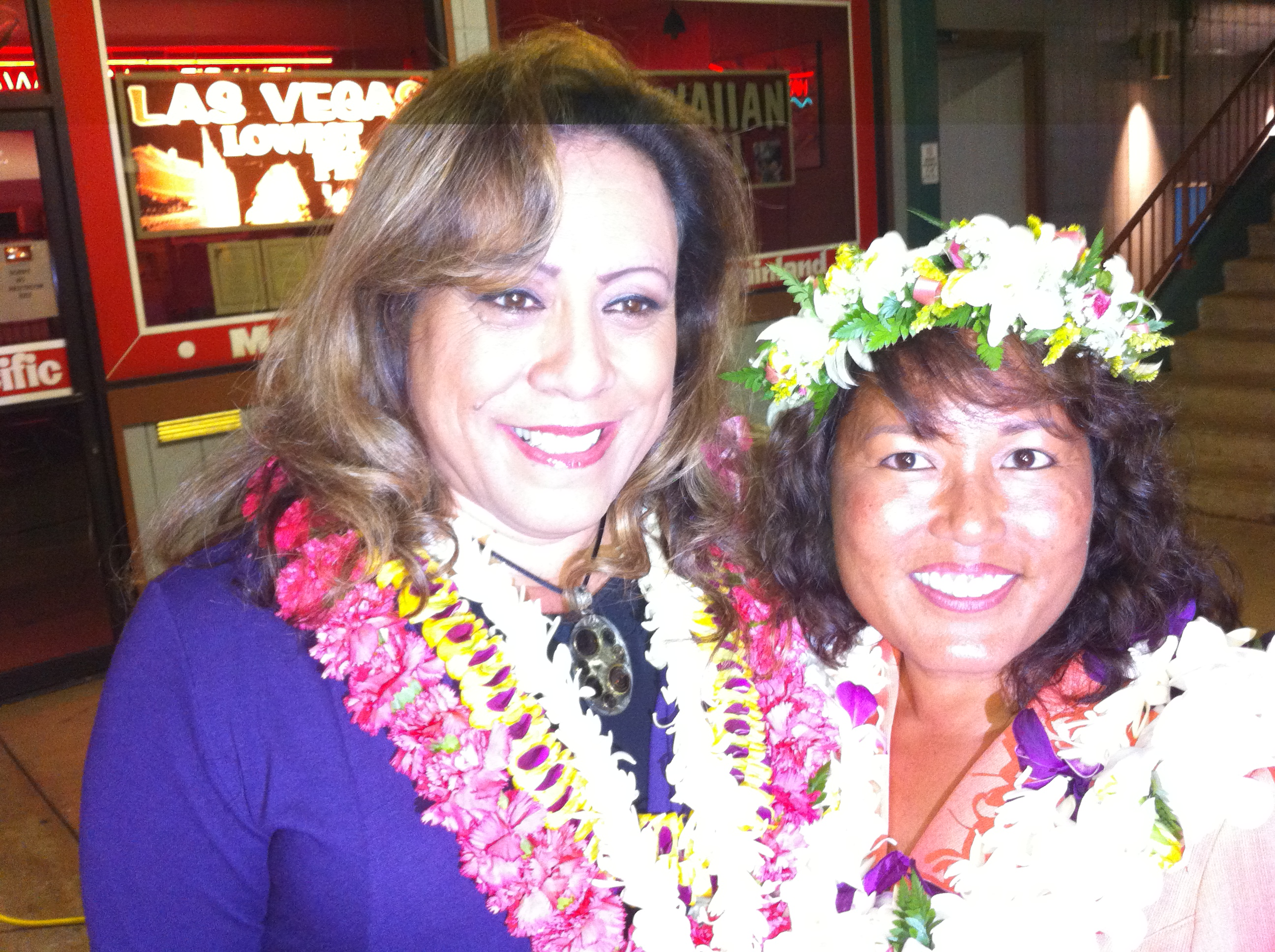
Cochran (right) and Mele Carroll (left) in November 2011.

Cochran was a Maui County councilmember for 8 years, from 2011 to 2018. In 2018, she ran for Mayor of Maui County and lost to Mike Victorino.

During the 2025 legislative session, Cochran notably missed 51 of 60 Hawaii House of Representatives floor sessions, an 85% absence rate, and 1,202 votes.

On March 16, 2026, she changed her party identification from Democrat to Republican, citing a need for "stronger advocacy and a louder voice" following the Maui wildfires.

Cochran lost her seat in the Hawaiʻi House of Representatives to Green Party candidate Pāʻele Kiakona in the 2026 general election.

She is the founder of the Save Honolua Coalition. She serves as Dame Commander, Royal Order of the Crown, for Owana Salazar. She has also earned certification as a court mediator.

== Personal life ==
Her husband, Wayne, owns the Maui Surfboards store in Honokowai. In 1993, she attempted to rob a group of tourists in Lahaina Cannery Mall at gunpoint, resulting in a felony conviction. She has a black belt in Taekwondo.

== See also ==
- List of American politicians who switched parties in office
