= Ian Ross (politician) =

American politician

Member of the Hawaii House of Representatives from the 26th district
- Incumbent
- Assumed office November 3, 2026
- Preceded by: Della Au Belatti

Personal details
- Born: 1990 or 1991 (age 35–36) Honolulu, Hawaii, U.S.
- Party: Democratic
- Education: University of Hawaii, Manoa (BA)

Ian M. A. Ross is an American politician who is a member-elect of the Hawaii House of Representatives from District 26.

== Early life and education ==
Ross was born in Makiki in Honolulu and raised on Kauaʻi. At 14 years old, Ross and his mother flew to Mississippi to aid Hurricane Katrina victims and families with special needs at Camp Yocona. He graduated from University of Hawaii, Manoa.

== Political career ==
Ross ran for the Hawaii State Senate in 2022. He was defeated by Carol Fukunaga in the Democratic primary election.

Ross first ran for the Hawaii House of Representatives in 2024 in the 23rd district. He placed second in the Democratic primary behind Ikaika Olds.

In 2026, Ross ran for the 26th district of the Hawaii House of Representatives where incumbent Della Au Belatti was retiring to run for lieutenant governor. A political action committee associated with the Pacific Resource Partnership spent more than $34,000 supporting Ross.
