= Gene Ward =

American politician (1943–2025)

- Ward in 2017

Minority Leader of the Hawaii House of Representatives
- In office November 9, 2018 – November 3, 2020
- Preceded by: Andria Tupola
- Succeeded by: Val Okimoto

Member of the Hawaii House of Representatives
- In office November 7, 2006 – March 31, 2025
- Preceded by: William Stonebreaker
- Succeeded by: Joe Gedeon
- Constituency: 17th district (2006–2022); 18th district (2022–2025)
- In office November 1990 – November 1998
- Preceded by: Fred Hirayama
- Succeeded by: Bertha Leong
- Constituency: 22nd district (1990–1992); 16th district (1992–1998)

Personal details
- Born: March 9, 1943 Conneaut, Ohio, U.S.
- Died: April 4, 2025 (aged 82)
- Party: Republican
- Education: University of Hawaii, Manoa (BA, MA, PhD)
- Website: Official website

Gene Rinna Ward (March 9, 1943 – April 4, 2025) was an American politician and Republican member of the Hawaii House of Representatives, serving in that body from 1990 to 1998 and 2006 to 2025. He previously served as the Minority Leader from 2018 to 2020. He was a Vietnam veteran and former Peace Corps Country Director in East Timor. He also served with the United Nations in Malawi, Africa and was a presidential appointee to the USAID during the George W. Bush administration.

On March 21, 2025, after nearly 27 years of public service, Ward announced his retirement on March 31 due to health issues. Until his retirement, he was the longest-serving member of the Hawaii House of Representatives.

== Background ==
Ward was born on March 9, 1943. He earned his BA, his MA in urban sociology, and his PhD in business sociology from the University of Hawaii at Manoa. His dissertation was a comparative study of Hawaiians in business compared to Europeans in business in Hawaii.

Ward died on April 4, 2025, at the age of 82.

== Electoral history ==
- 1990: Ward initially won the November 6, 1990, general election.
- 1992: Ward was unopposed for the District 16 September 21, 1992, Republican primary, winning with 1,508 votes, and won the November 3, 1992, general election with 6,562 votes (69.5%) against Democratic nominee Steve Boggs.
- 1994: Ward won the September 17, 1994, Republican primary, and won the November 8, 1994, general election with 7,213 votes (78.7%) against Democratic nominee Mark Auerbach.
- 1996: Ward was unopposed for the September 21, 1996, Republican primary, winning with 3,088 votes, and won the November 5, 1996, general election with 6,323 votes (68.3%) against Democratic nominee William Hoshijo.
- 1998: To challenge incumbent Democratic United States Representative Neil Abercrombie for Hawaii's 1st congressional district seat, Ward won the September 21, 1996, Republican primary, winning with 54,844 votes (65.6%) against Quentin Kawānanakoa, but lost the November 5, 1996, general election to Abercrombie, who held the seat until 2010.
- 2006: When Republican Representative William Stonebreaker retired and left the District 17 seat open, Ward was unopposed for the September 26, 2006, Republican primary, winning with 855 votes, and won the November 7, 2006, general election with 5,450 votes (55.1%) against Democratic nominee A.J. Halagao.
- 2008: Ward was unopposed for the September 20, 2008, Republican primary, winning with 2,142 votes, and the November 4, 2008, general election with 6,979 votes (55.3%) against Democratic nominee Amy Monk.
- 2010: Ward was unopposed for both the September 18, 2010, Republican primary, winning with 1,741 votes, and the November 2, 2010, general election.
- 2012: Ward was unopposed for both the August 11, 2012, Republican primary, winning with 2,039 votes, and the November 6, 2012, general election.
- 2014: Ward and Democrat Chris Stump, neither of whom were opposed in their party's August 9, 2014, primary election, faced each other in the November 4, 2014, general election, with Ward winning 7,535 votes (71.6%) to 2,555 (24.3%).

Hawaii House of Representatives
Preceded by Fred K. Hirayama, Jr.	Member of the Hawaii House of Representatives from the 22nd district 1991–1993	Succeeded by Mazie Hirono
Preceded by Terrance W. H. Tom	Member of the Hawaii House of Representatives from the 16th district 1993–1999	Succeeded by Bertha F. K. Leong
Preceded by William Stonebreaker	Member of the Hawaii House of Representatives from the 17th district 2007–2023	Succeeded by Dee Morikawa
Preceded by Mark Hashem	Member of the Hawaii House of Representatives from the 18th district 2023–2025	Succeeded by Joe Gedeon
Preceded by Lynn Finnegan	Minority Leader of the Hawaii House of Representatives; 2011–2013	Succeeded by Aaron Ling Johanson
Preceded by Andria Tupola	Minority Leader of the Hawaii House of Representatives; 2019–2021	Succeeded by Val Okimoto
