= Derek Kawakami =

American politician

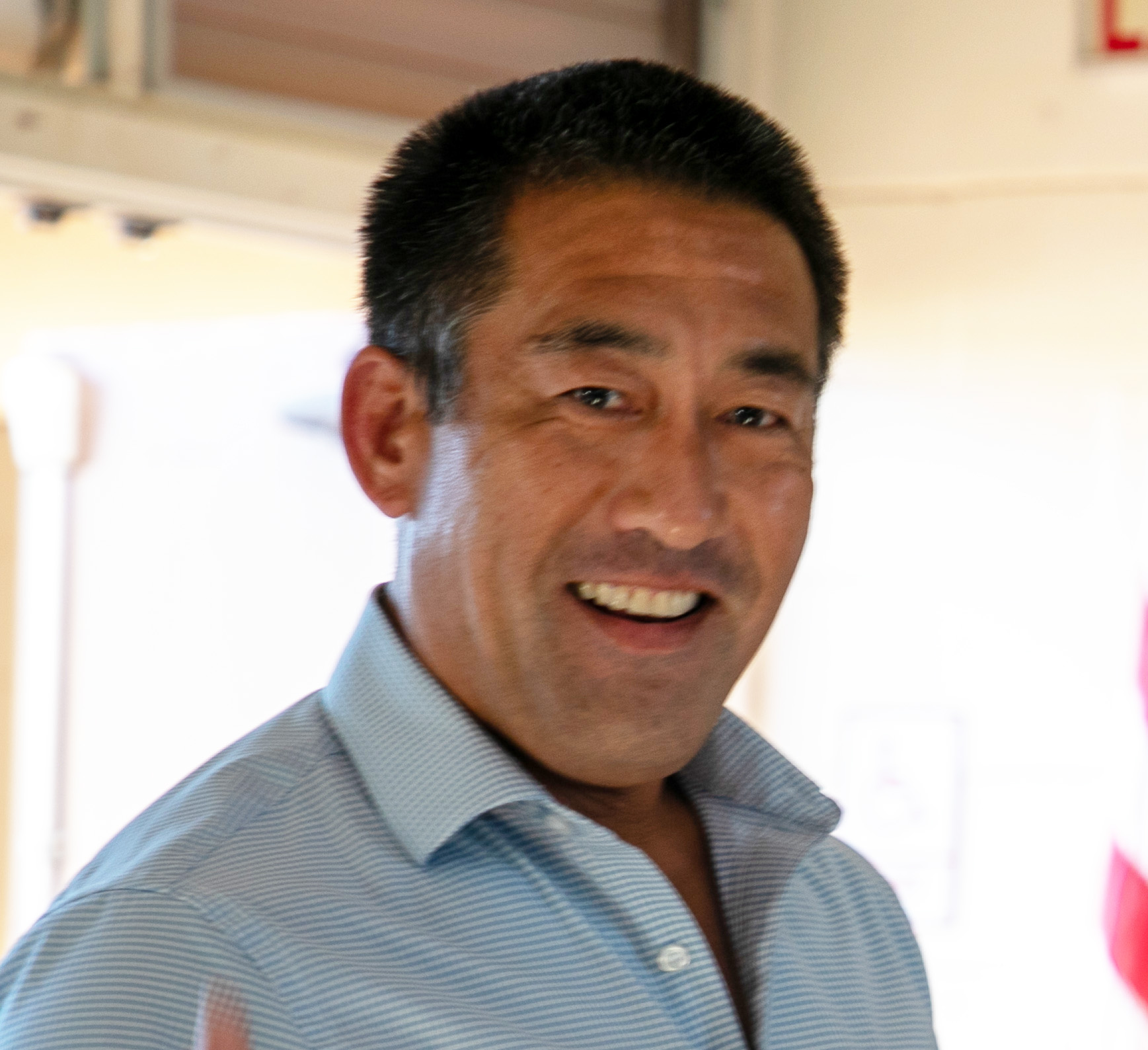
- Kawakami in 2025

Lieutenant Governor-elect of Hawaii
- Assuming office December 7, 2026
- Governor: Josh Green
- Succeeding: Sylvia Luke

11th Mayor of Kauai
- Incumbent
- Assumed office December 3, 2018
- Preceded by: Bernard Carvalho

Member of the Hawaii House of Representatives from the 14th district
- In office April 4, 2011 – November 8, 2016
- Appointed by: Neil Abercrombie
- Preceded by: Hermina Morita
- Succeeded by: Nadine Nakamura

Personal details
- Born: Derek Saburo Kawehi Kawakami; August 19, 1977 (age 49) Hilo, Hawaii, U.S.
- Party: Democratic
- Education: Kauai Community College (attended); Chaminade University (BA)
- Website: Campaign website

Derek Saburo Kawehi Kawakami (born August 19, 1977) is an American politician who is the lieutenant governor-elect of Hawaii. He has served since 2018 as the eleventh Mayor of Kauai. Kawakami previously served as a Kauaʻi County Councilmember from 2016–2018 and 2008–2011 and as a member of the Hawaii House of Representatives from April 4, 2011 through November 8, 2016. Kawakami was appointed to the House by Governor Neil Abercrombie to fill the vacancy caused by the appointment of Hermina Morita to chair the Hawaii Public Utilities Commission. Kawakami is a member of the Democratic Party.

Kawakami was elected lieutenant governor of Hawaii in the 2026 Hawaii gubernatorial election.

== Education ==
Kawakami graduated from Kauai High School in 1996. He attended Kauaʻi Community College and earned his BA from Chaminade University of Honolulu.

== Personal life ==
Kawakami and his wife Monica have two children. He has a wrist tattoo that says "Moniquita" for his wife.

He is the nephew of former Representative Richard Kawakami, a former Speaker of the Hawaii House of Representatives, and former Representative Bertha Kawakami.

Kawakami's father, Charles Kawakami, was a prominent businessman who was president of Big Save before it was sold to Times Supermarkets, and MFM, Inc. before it was sold to Aloha Petroleum.

== Elections ==
- 2012 Kawakami was unopposed for both the August 11, 2012 Democratic Primary, winning with 3,261 votes, and the November 6, 2012 General election.
- Elected Kauai Council Member November 8, 2016, coming in first with 15,990 votes.
- Elected Mayor of Kauai on November 6, 2018, defeating Mel Rapozo by a count of 16,797 to 7,969.

Party political offices
Preceded by Sylvia Luke	Democratic nominee for Lieutenant Governor of Hawaii; 2026	Most recent
