= Blake Oshiro =

American politician

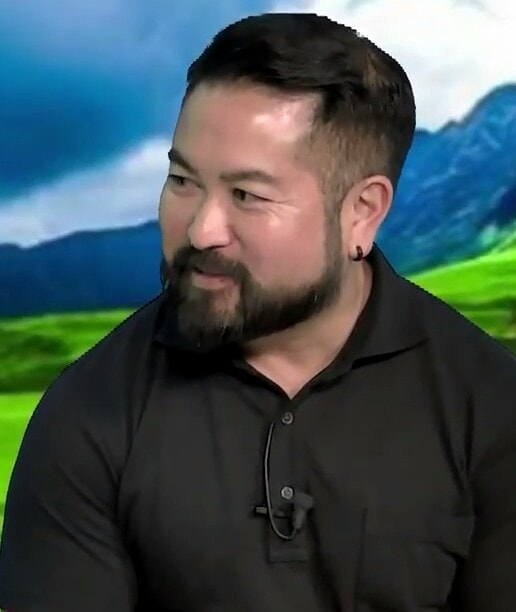

Majority Leader of the Hawaii House of Representatives
- In office November 2008 – December 7, 2011
- Preceded by: Kirk Caldwell
- Succeeded by: Pono Chong

Member of the Hawaii House of Representatives from the 33rd district
- In office January 2001 – December 7, 2011
- Preceded by: Tom Okamura
- Succeeded by: Tom Okamura

Personal details
- Born: January 16, 1970 (age 56) Honolulu, Hawaii, U.S.
- Party: Democratic
- Education: University of Southern California (BA); University of Hawaii, Manoa (JD)

Blake Ken Oshiro (born January 16, 1970) is an American politician and lawyer. He has served as senior advisor to Governor Josh Green. From 2011 to 2014, he served as deputy chief of staff to Governor Neil Abercrombie. Oshiro previously served as Majority Leader of the Hawaii House of Representatives, where he represented District 33, comprising the Honolulu neighborhoods of Aiea and Halawa. He spent eleven years in the legislature.

== Education ==
A Japanese American, Oshiro graduated from Pearl City High School, the University of Southern California, and the William S. Richardson School of Law at the University of Hawaiʻi at Mānoa. In 2011, Oshiro completed Harvard University's John F. Kennedy School of Government program for Senior Executives in State and Local Government as a David Bohnett Foundation LGBTQ Victory Institute Leadership Fellow.

== Career ==
Oshiro was first elected to the House in 2000 and took office the following January. He subsequently won re-election at two-year intervals. Oshiro came out as gay in 2010 during the debate over Hawaii House Bill 444, which granted civil union rights to same-sex couples in Hawaii. He was the main author of the bill. He subsequently faced a socially conservative primary challenger in his 2010 race for reelection, Honolulu City Councilman Gary Okino. Oshiro defeated Okino by 56 percent to 44%. In the general election held on November 2, 2010, Oshiro was reelected over Republican opponent Sam Satoru Kong by a margin of 54.5% to 45.5%.

In November 2011, Oshiro announced that he would resign from the legislature in order to become Neil Abercrombie's deputy chief of staff. His resignation became effective December 7, 2011. Per Hawaii law, Governor Abercrombie had to select Oshiro's successor as state representative from the 33rd district. He chose former state representative and majority leader Tom Okamura, who Oshiro had succeeded in January 2001. Due to poor health, Okamura had to resign just weeks after accepting the appointment. Abercrombie appointed Heather Giugni, a Native Hawaiian filmmaker, to the seat in February 2012. After Abercrombie left office at the end of 2014, Oshiro returned to the private sector as a lawyer with Honolulu law firm Alston Hunt Floyd.

In December 2022, after serving on Governor Josh Green's transition team, Oshiro was appointed as Green's senior advisor. He now works for Capitol Consultants of Hawaii, the state's largest lobbying firm.

Hawaii House of Representatives
Preceded by Kirk Caldwell	Majority Leader of the Hawaii House of Representatives; 2008–2011	Succeeded by Pono Chong
