= Lyla Berg =

American politician

Member of the Hawaii House of Representatives from the 18th district
- In office 2004 – November 2, 2010
- Preceded by: Bertha Leong
- Succeeded by: Mark Hashem

Personal details
- Born: March 15, 1951 (age 75)
- Party: Democratic

Lyla Bonnie Berg (born March 15, 1951) is a Hawaiian Democratic politician. She was first elected to the Hawaii House of Representatives in 2004 representing the Kāhala area of Honolulu on Oahu. Berg was a Democratic candidate for Lieutenant Governor of Hawaii in the 2010 election. She lost in the primary to Brian Schatz.

She was once married to former senator Clayton Hee.
