= Hermina Morita =

American politician (born 1954)

Mina Morita
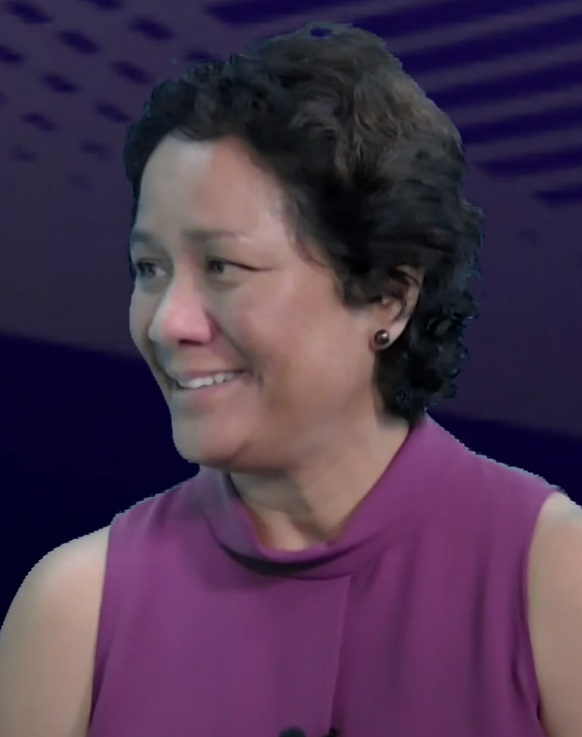
- Morita in 2016

Member of the Hawaii House of Representatives from the 14th district
- In office 1996–2011
- Preceded by: Billy Swain
- Succeeded by: Derek Kawakami

Personal details
- Born: September 2, 1954 (age 71) Honolulu, Territory of Hawaii
- Party: Democratic
- Spouse: Lance Laney
- Children: 2

Hermina "Mina" Morita (born September 2, 1954) is an American politician and former chair of the Public Utilities Commission (PUC) of the State of Hawaii. She previously served as a Democratic member of the Hawaii House of Representatives, representing the state's 14th District between her election in 1996 and 2011, when she was appointed to the PUC. The district includes Hanalei, Princeville, and Kapaa on the island of Kauai. Morita was the chair of the House Committee on Energy and Environmental Protection.

On March 14, 2011, Morita was confirmed as chair of the Hawaii Public Utilities Commission. She was appointed by Governor Neil Abercrombie and is the first ever female chair of the PUC.

In January 2015, she announced her resignation from her position as Chair of the Public Utilities Commission. In February 2015, she said she will advise the Hawaii State House Committee on Finance.

After retiring from state government, Morita has served on the board of directors of Hanalei Initiative, a Hanalei-based community nonprofit organization.
