= James Wataru =

American politician

Member of the Hawaii House of Representatives from the 18th district
- Incumbent
- Assumed office November 3, 2026
- Preceded by: Joe Gedeon

Personal details
- Party: Democratic
- Website: Campaign website

James (Jamie) Wataru is an American politician. A member of the Democratic Party, he has served in the Hawaii House of Representatives since 2026, representing the 18th district. He was elected at the 2026 election. The district contains Portlock, Hawaiʻi Kai and Kalama Valley. He is a plumber by profession.
