= Daniel Holt =

American politician

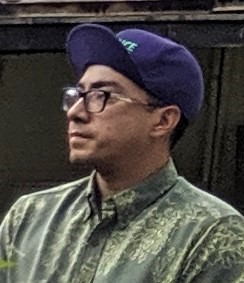
- Holt in 2019

Member of the Hawaii House of Representatives
- In office November 8, 2016 – February 14, 2026
- Preceded by: Karl Rhoads
- Succeeded by: Cov Ratcliffe
- Constituency: 29th district (2016–2022); 28th district (2022–2026)

Personal details
- Born: Honolulu, Hawaii
- Party: Democratic
- Education: University of the Pacific (BS)

Daniel Holt is an American politician who represented the 28th district in the Hawaii House of Representatives. He won the seat after incumbent Democrat Karl Rhoads decided not to run for re–election in 2017. He defeated several Democratic candidates in the District 29 primaries and won against Republican Kaiwiola Coakley in the general election. He ran for District 29 in 2012 as well, losing in a primary election to incumbent Karl Rhoads. He resigned in February 2026 in order to take a position as special assistant to the chair of the Hawaii Department of Land and Natural Resources.

== Early life and education ==
Holt was born in Honolulu, Hawaii. His father, Milton Holt, served in the both chambers of the Hawaii State Legislature between 1978 and 1996. He graduated from Kamehameha Schools then earned a Bachelor of Science in business administration from the University of the Pacific.

== Hawaii House of Representatives ==
In 2012, Holt ran and lost to incumbent Democrat Karl Rhoads in the Democratic primary election for the 29th district of the Hawaii House of Representatives.

In 2016, Holt defeated Republican candidate Kaiwiola Coakley to succeeded Rhoads, who ran for the Hawaii State Senate.
