= Della Au Belatti =

American politician (born 1974)

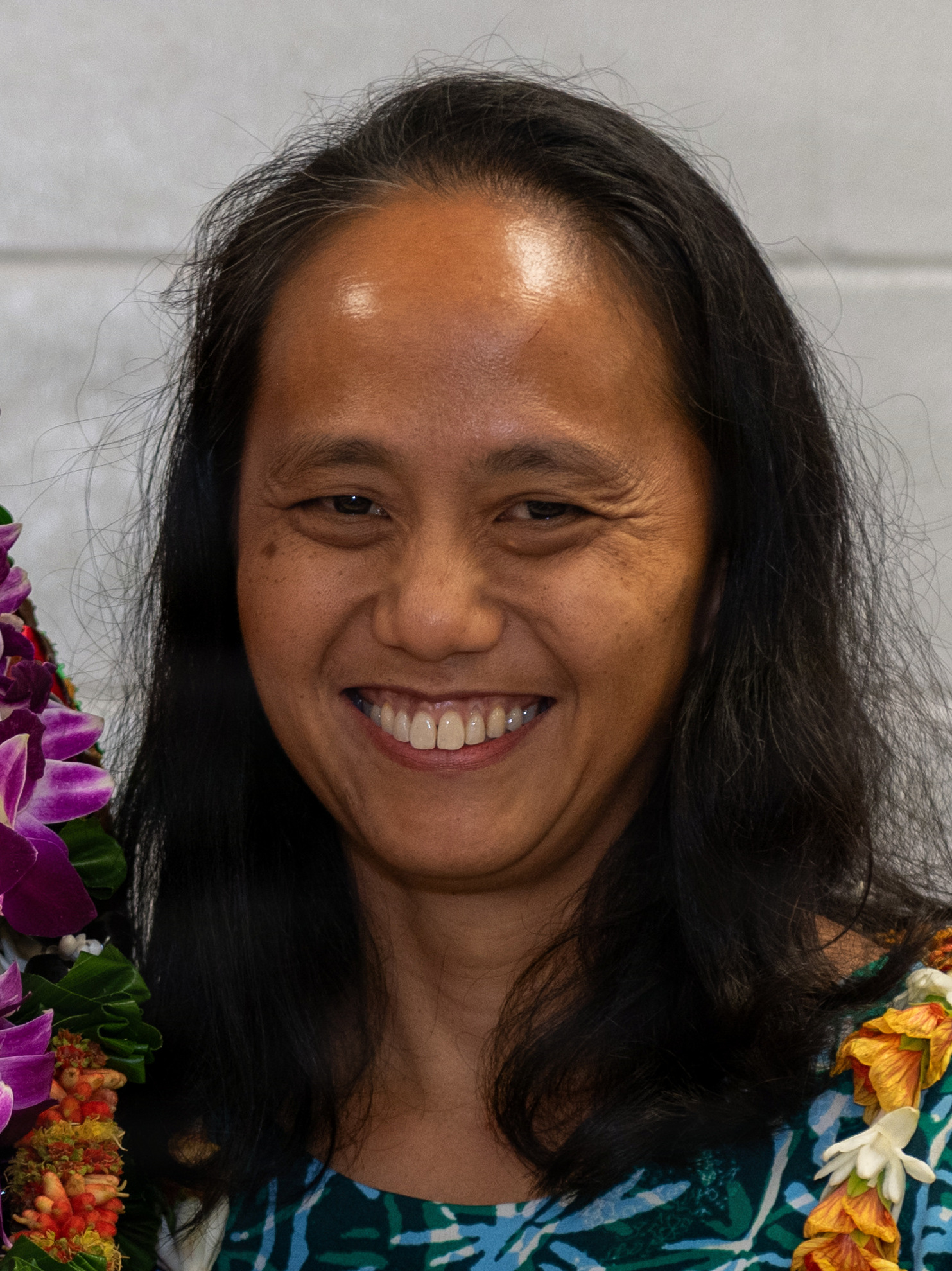
- Belatti in 2026

Majority Leader of the Hawaii House of Representatives
- In office October 4, 2017 – November 8, 2022
- Preceded by: Scott Saiki
- Succeeded by: Nadine Nakamura

Member of the Hawaii House of Representatives
- In office November 7, 2006 – November 3, 2026
- Preceded by: Brian Schatz
- Succeeded by: Ian Ross
- Constituency: 25th district (2006–2012); 24th district (2012-2022); 26th district (2022–present)

Personal details
- Born: March 14, 1974 (age 52) Honolulu, Hawaii, U.S.
- Party: Democratic
- Education: Princeton University (BA); University of Hawaii, Manoa (JD)

Della Au Belatti (born March 14, 1974) is an American politician and a Democratic member of the Hawaii House of Representatives representing District 26 since 2012. Belatti served consecutively from November 2006 until 2012 in the District 25 seat and from November 2012 to 2022 in the District 24 seat. The district includes Makiki and Tantalus, along with portions of McCully and Papakolea on the island of Oahu.

On September 26, 2025, Belatti announced her candidacy for the U.S. House of Representatives from Hawaii's 1st congressional district. On May 28, 2026, Belatti withdrew her candidacy for Congress and switched to run for Lieutenant Governor when incumbent Lt. Gov. Sylvia Luke's withdrew from the election due to a bribery investigation.

== Education ==
Belatti attended Maryknoll School in Honolulu and graduated in 1992. She graduated with an A.B. in history from Princeton University in 1996 after completing an 82-page long senior thesis, titled "A Study of Education in Hawaii, 1945-1959: Change and Continuity in Three Schools", under the supervision of Stephen Aron. She then received her Juris Doctor from the William S. Richardson School of Law at the University of Hawaiʻi at Mānoa.

== Career ==
Belatti's work experience includes working as an associate attorney with the law office of Eric A. Seitz; a law clerk to former Hawaii Supreme Court Justice Simeon R. Acoba Jr. and former Hawaii First Circuit Court Justice Dexter D. Del Rosario; and a high school social studies teacher with Maryknoll School. Belatti has also previously served as a commissioner on the Hawai'i State Campaign Spending Commission.

=== 2026 lieutenant gubernatorial election ===
Belatti is a candidate for Lieutenant Governor of Hawaii in the 2026 election. Belatti has stated that her campaign prioritizies cost-of-living issues facing Hawaii, including energy, housing, and food costs. She has criticized the leadership of Hawaii's Democratic Party, stating that "Democratic leadership, right now, is like they're so tied to certain corporate interests that they're not willing to move on those things". Her campaign has been endorsed by the Hawaii Government Employees Association. She opposes tax cuts for the wealthy, stating that "Billionaires who benefit from our islands need to pay their equitable share of taxes to support Hawai‘i’s infrastructure and other needs".

== Elections ==
- 2006: When Democratic Representative Brian Schatz left the state legislature and left the District 25 seat open, Belatti won the three-way September 26, 2006 Democratic Primary with 2,145 votes (43.2%), and won the November 7, 2006 general election with 3,996 votes (58.2%) against Republican nominee Tracy Okubo, who had sought the seat in 2004.
- 2008: Belatti was unopposed for both the September 20, 2008 Democratic primary, winning with 2,343 votes, and the November 4, 2008 general election.
- 2010: Belatti was unopposed for the September 18, 2010 Democratic Primary, winning with 3,466 votes, and won the November 2, 2010 general election with 4,302 votes (59.4%) against Republican nominee Isaiah Sabey.
- 2012: Redistricted to District 24, and with Democratic Representative Isaac Choy redistricted to District 23, Belatti won the August 11, 2012 Democratic Primary with 3,024 votes (64.1%); her 2010 Republican challenger, Isaiah Sabey was unopposed in the Republican primary, setting up a rematch. Belatti won the November 6, 2012 general election with 5,367 votes (62.1%) against Sabey.

Hawaii House of Representatives
Preceded by Cindy Evans	Majority Leader of the Hawaii House of Representatives; 2017–2022	Succeeded by Nadine Nakamura
