= Pāʻele Kiakona =

American politician

- Kiakona in 2025

Member of the Hawaii House of Representatives from the 14th district
- Incumbent
- Assumed office November 3, 2026
- Preceded by: Elle Cochran

Personal details
- Born: 1994 or 1995 (age 31–32) Lahaina, Hawaii, US
- Party: Green
- Education: University of Hawaiʻi at Hilo

Pāʻele Kiakona is an American organizer and politician who is a member-elect of the Hawaii House of Representatives for the 14th district, which includes parts of western Maui. A member of the Green Party, he defeated Republican incumbent Elle Cochran and Democratic nominee Sne Patel in the 2026 election. Kiakona is the first third-party candidate to be elected to the Hawaii State Legislature, and will be the only member of the Green Party to hold office in any state legislature.

Following the 2023 Hawaii wildfires, Kiakona began organizing for Lahaina Strong.

== Early life and education ==
Kiakona was born in Lahaina, Maui. He is Native Hawaiian. Kiakona's father, Moses, served in federal prison following a 2006 conviction for leading a methamphetamine ring.

Kiakona graduated from Kamehameha Schools Hawaiʻi Campus. In September 2018, he was one of several University of Hawaiʻi at Hilo students whose short stories about the climate were published in an anthology.

== Career ==
Prior to the 2023 Hawaii wildfires, Kiakona worked in the service industry. He bicycled from his Honokohau Valley home to his grandmother's Lahaina home, which was ultimately destroyed, to warn her of the impending Lahaina wildfire in August 2023. A post by him documenting the journey went viral on social media. He then became involved in community organizing, serving as president of the Save Honolua Coalition and a leader of Lahaina Strong. Kiakona organized for increased regulation of short-term rental properties with the Lahaina Strong group.

In May 2025, Kiakona was appointed to the Maui County Board of Water Supply.

== Hawaii House of Representatives ==
In March 2026, Kiakona announced he would run for the 14th district of the Hawaii House of Representatives as a member of the Green Party, challenging Democratic incumbent Elle Cochran. About a week later, Cochran announced she had switched her party affiliation to the Republican Party. The move set up a three-way showdown between Kiakona, Cochran, and Democratic nominee Sne Patel. In September 2026, his campaign was endorsed by five of Hawaii's largest unions including the Hawaii Government Employees Association, ILWU Local 142, Hawaii State Teachers Association, United Public Workers, and UNITE HERE! Local 5.

In the general election on November 3, 2026, Kiakona narrowly defeated Patel with 41.1% of the vote. His election marked the first time a third party politician has been elected to the Hawaii State Legislature and the fifth time that a member of the Green Party had been elected to any state legislature. Previously, members of the Home Rule Party of Hawaii served in the Hawaii Territorial Legislature until 1904.
