= Majority Leader of the Hawaii House of Representatives =

Position in the Hawaii state legislature

The majority leader is the chief spokesperson for the majority party (in politics) in the Hawaii House of Representatives.

== Pre-statehood ==
Name	Term	Party
Daniel Inouye	1954–1958	Democratic
Spark Matsunaga	1957–1959	Democratic

== House of Representatives of the State of Hawaiʻi ==
Name	Term	Party
Howard Y. Miyake	1959–1970	Democratic
James H. Wakatsuki	1971–1974	Democratic
Charles T. Ushijima	1975–1976	Democratic
Ronald Y. Kondo	1977–1978	Democratic
Henry H. Peters	1979–1980	Democratic
Dennis R. Yamada	1981–1982	Democratic
Russell Blair	1983–1984	Democratic
Richard Kawakami	1985–1986	Democratic
Tom Okamura	1987–1990	Democratic
Brian T. Taniguchi	1991–1992	Democratic
Rosalyn Baker	1993–1994	Democratic
Tom Okamura	1995–1997	Democratic
Dennis Arakaki	1998	Democratic
Ed Case	1999–2000	Democratic
Marcus Oshiro	2001–2002	Democratic
Scott Saiki	2003–2004	Democratic
Marcus Oshiro	2005–2006	Democratic
Kirk Caldwell	2007–2008	Democratic
Blake Oshiro	2008–2011	Democratic
Pono Chong	2011–2012	Democratic
Scott Saiki	2013–2017	Democratic
Cindy Evans	2017	Democratic
Della Au Belatti	2017–2022	Democratic
Nadine K. Nakamura	2022–2024	Democratic
Sean Quinlan	2024–Present	Democratic
