= 2026 Hawaii gubernatorial election =

- November 3, 2026
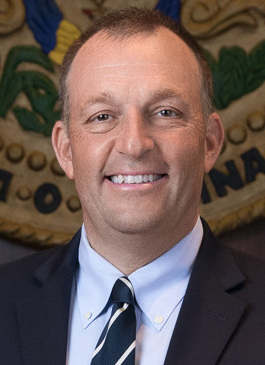

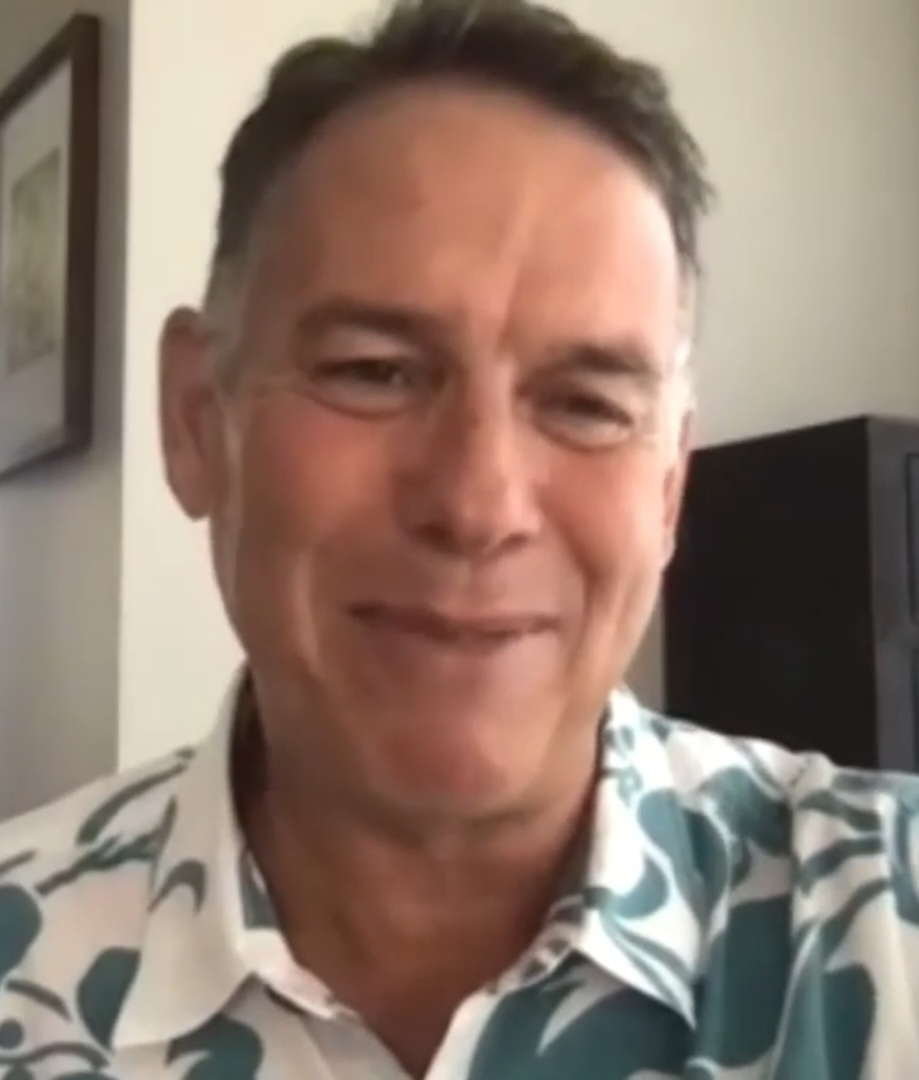
Nominee	Josh Green	Gary Cordery
Party	Democratic	Republican
Running mate	Derek Kawakami	Daniel Anthony
Popular vote	279,445	105,258
Percentage	72.64%	27.36%
- Green: 70–80% No data
Governor before election
Josh Green
Democratic
Elected Governor
Josh Green
Democratic

The 2026 Hawaii gubernatorial election was held on November 3, 2026, to elect the governor of Hawaii. Democratic incumbent Josh Green defeated Republican businessman Gary Cordery to win a second term in office.

Primary elections took place on August 8, 2026. Green secured the Democratic nomination with 88.5% of the vote against three other candidates. Cordery defeated Ken Fujiyama in the Republican primary with 75.9% of the vote.

Green received the highest vote share of any gubernatorial candidate in Hawaii history, winning nearly 73 percent of the vote and defeating his opponent by over 45 points.

Republicans have not won a gubernatorial election in Hawaii since 2006.

== Democratic primary ==
=== Governor ===
==== Candidates ====
===== Nominee =====
- Josh Green, incumbent governor (2022–present)

===== Eliminated in primary =====
- Duke Bourgoin
- George (Teva) Lucas-Tadeo
- Lauren Kapoliahi'iaka Shim

===== Declined =====
- Mike Gabbard, state senator from SD-21 (2006–present)

=== Results ===
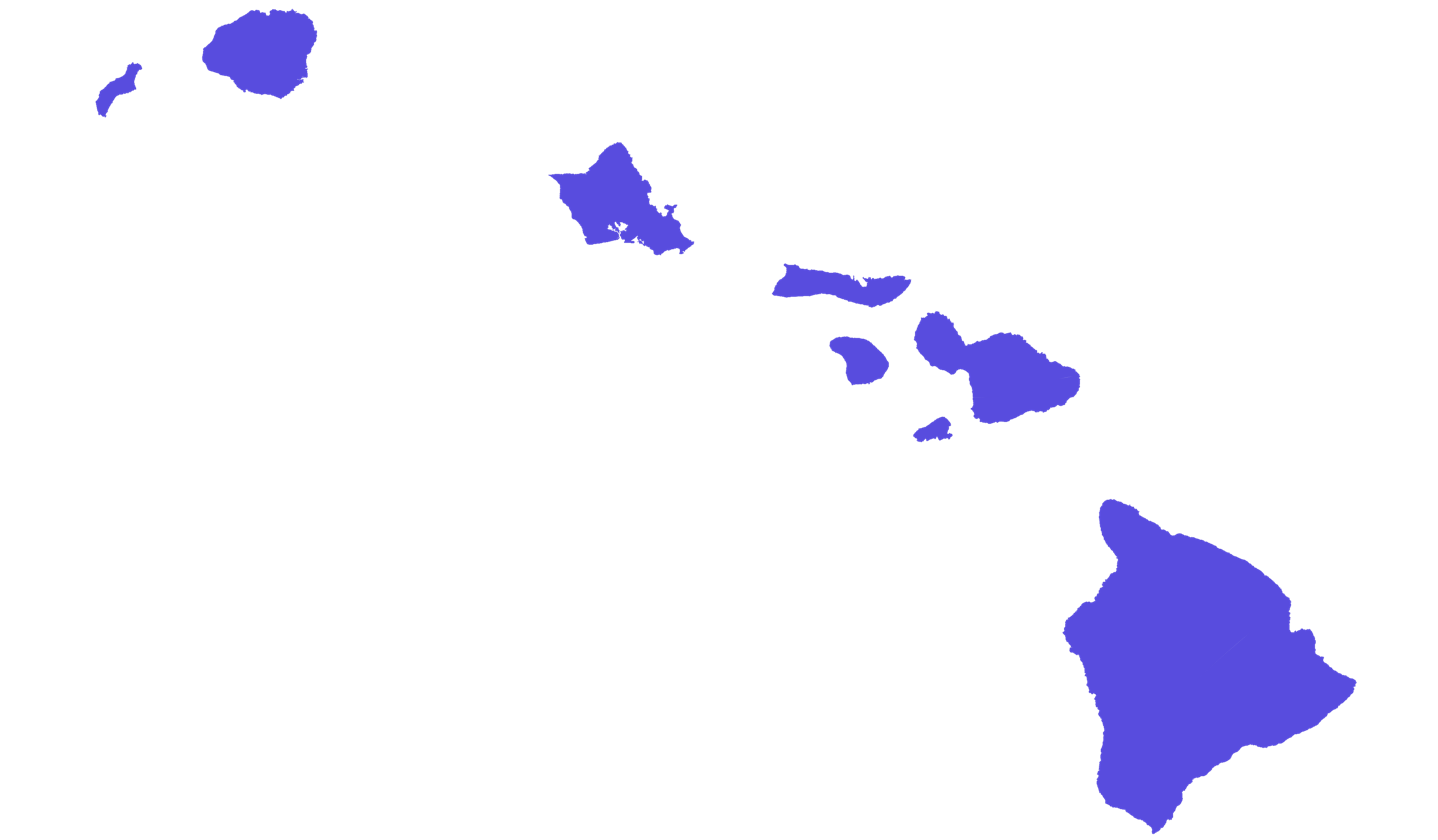
Results by county: Green—70–80%

Democratic primary results
Party	Candidate	Votes	%
Democratic	Josh Green (incumbent)	184,289	88.5
Democratic	Lauren Kapoliahi’iaka Shim	11,199	5.4
Democratic	George Lucas-Tadeo	8,134	3.9
Democratic	Duke Bourgoin	4,595	2.2
Total votes		208,217	100.0

=== Lieutenant governor ===
==== Candidates ====
===== Nominee =====
- Derek Kawakami, mayor of Kauai (2018–present)

===== Eliminated in primary =====
- Della Au Belatti, state representative from HD-26 (2006–present)
- John Choi, civil trial attorney
- Ku L. (Bobby) Cuadra
- Sam Puletasi

===== Withdrawn =====
- Sylvia Luke, incumbent lieutenant governor (2022–present)

===== Declined =====
- Kai Kahele, chair of the Office of Hawaiian Affairs Board of Trustees (2024–present), former U.S. representative for Hawaii's 2nd congressional district (2021–2023), and candidate for governor in 2022

==== Endorsements ====
Della Belatti

Organizations

- Indivisible Hawaiʻi

Labor Unions

- University of Hawaiʻi Professional Assembly
Derek Kawakami

Organizations

- Pacific Resource Partnership PAC
Sylvia Luke (withdrawn)

Labor unions

- University of Hawaiʻi Professional Assembly

=== Results ===
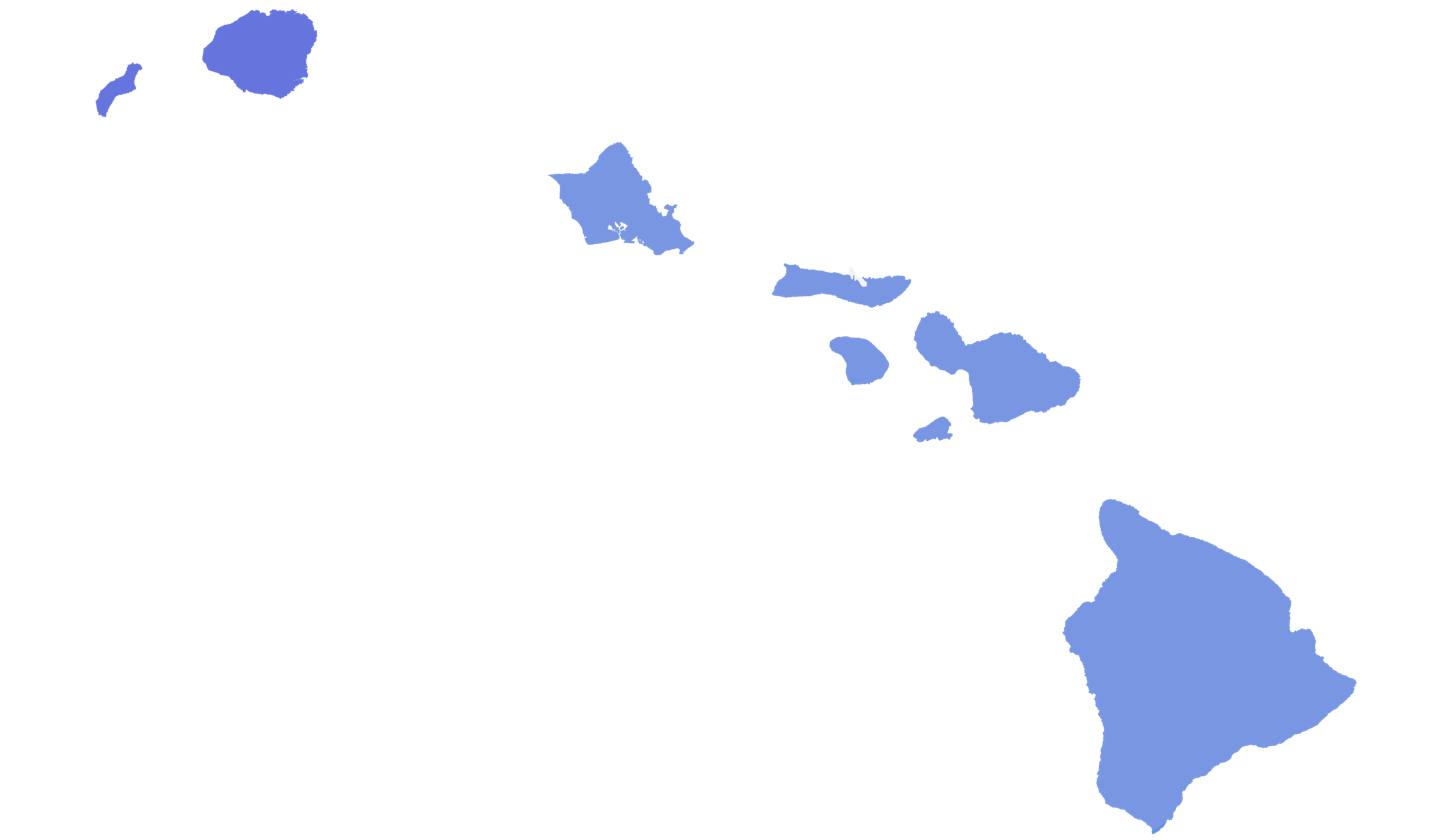
Results by county: Kawakami—70–80% Kawakami—60–70%

Democratic primary results
Party	Candidate	Votes	%
Democratic	Derek Kawakami	140,247	66.1
Democratic	Della Au Belatti	55,245	26.1
Democratic	John Choi	13,009	6.1
Democratic	Sam Puletasi	2,152	1.0
Democratic	Ku L. Cuadra	1,417	0.7
Total votes		212,070	100.0

== Republican primary ==
=== Governor ===
==== Candidates ====
===== Nominee =====
- Gary Cordery, businessman and candidate for governor in 2022

==== Eliminated in primary ====
- Ken Fujiyama

==== Withdrawn ====
- Bu Laia Hill

===== Declined =====
- Mike Gabbard, state senator from SD-21 (2006–present) (Democratic)

=== Results ===
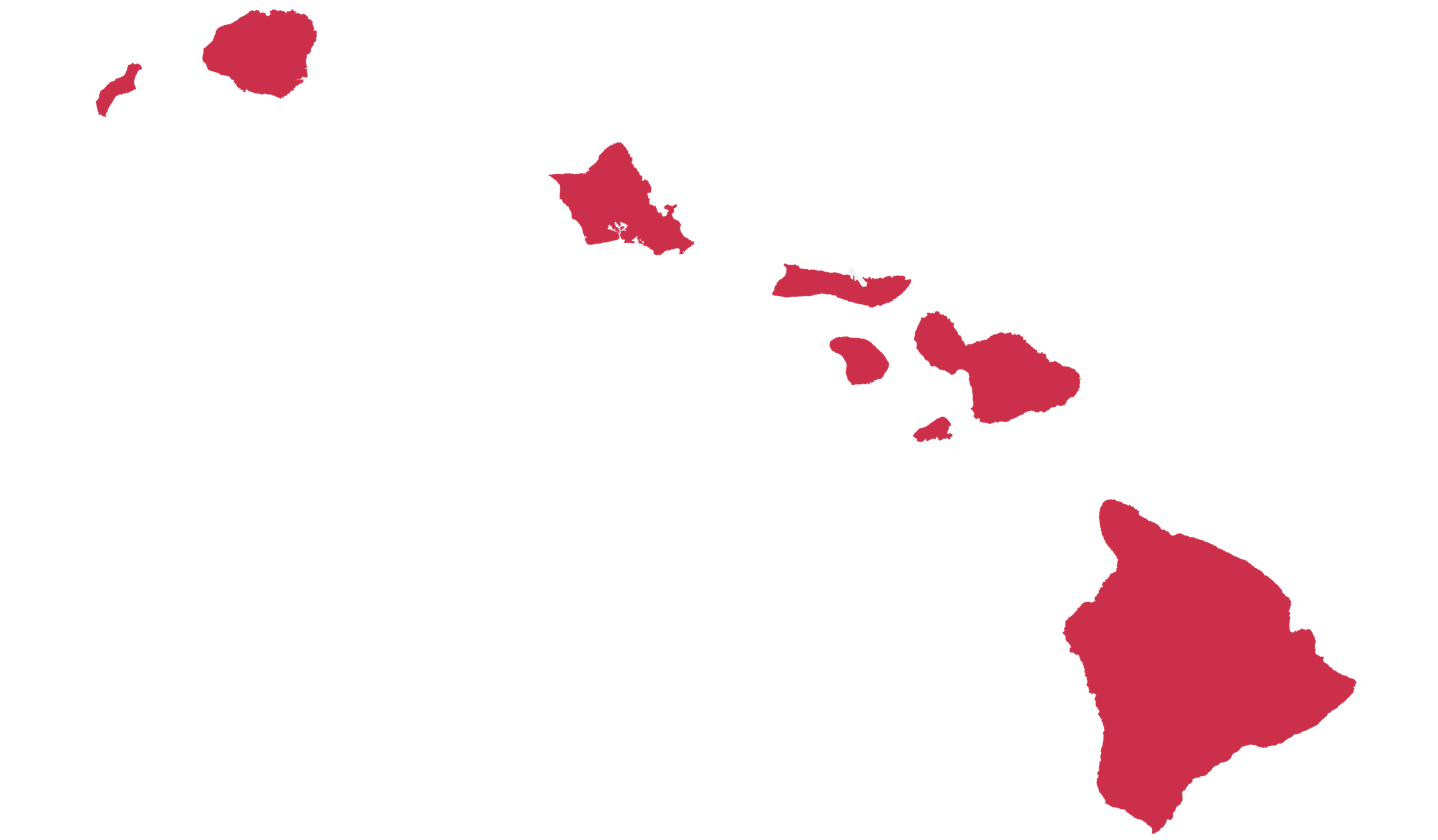
Results by county: Cordery—70–80%

Republican primary results
Party	Candidate	Votes	%
Republican	Gary Cordery	36,428	75.8
Republican	Ken Fujiyama	11,599	24.2
Total votes		48,027	100.0

=== Lieutenant governor ===
==== Candidates ====
===== Nominee =====
- Daniel Anthony

===== Eliminated in primary =====
- Hopelin (Hope) Cresencia
- Margaret Rose Mejia
- Robert E. Peters

===== Withdrawn =====
- Ku-Lono Cuadra

=== Results ===
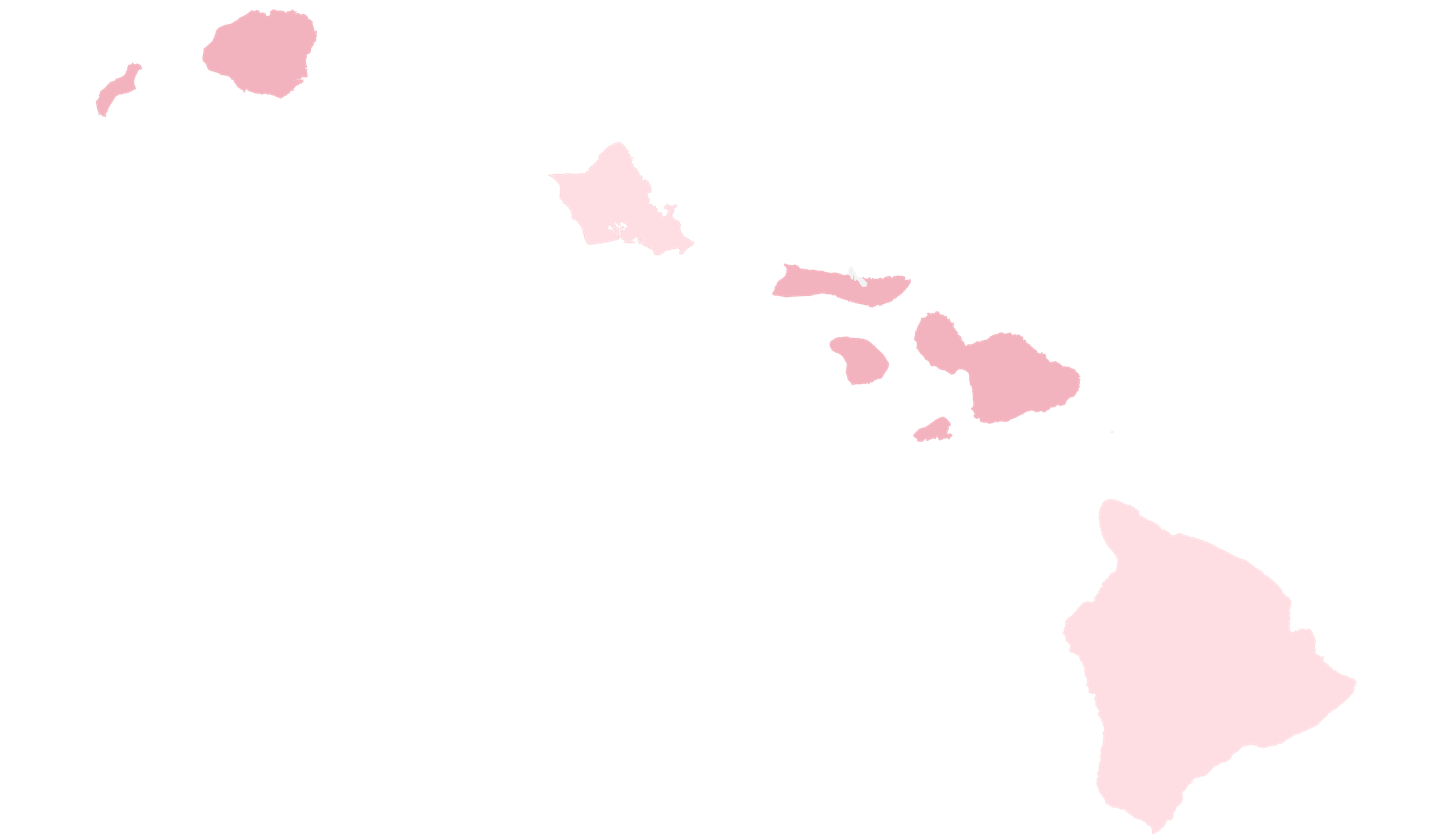
Results by county: Anthony—40–50% Anthony—30–40%

Republican primary results
Party	Candidate	Votes	%
Republican	Daniel Anthony	16,982	37.9
Republican	Margaret Rose Mejia	10,833	24.2
Republican	Robert E. Peters	8,899	19.9
Republican	Hopelin Cresencia	8,070	18.0
Total votes		44,784	100.0

== General election ==
=== Predictions ===
Source	Ranking	As of
The Cook Political Report	Solid D	October 29, 2026
Decision Desk HQ	Safe D	November 3, 2026
Fox News	Solid D	November 1, 2026
Inside Elections	Solid D	October 29, 2026
NBC News	Solid D	November 3, 2026
RealClearPolitics	Solid D	November 1, 2026
Sabato's Crystal Ball	Safe D	November 2, 2026
Silver Bulletin	Solid D	November 3, 2026

=== Results ===
2026 Hawaii gubernatorial election
Party	Candidate	Votes	%	±%
Democratic	Josh Green (incumbent); Derek Kawakami	279,445	72.64	+9.48
Republican	Gary Cordery; Daniel Anthony	105,258	27.36	−9.48
Total votes		384,703	100.0	
Democratic hold				

==== By Congressional District ====
Green won both congressional districts.

District	Green	Cordery	Elected Representative
1st	74.97%	25.03%	Ed Case
2nd	72.04%	27.96%	Jill Tokuda

== See also ==
- 2026 United States elections
- 2026 Hawaii elections
