= Nadine Nakamura =

American politician (born 1961)

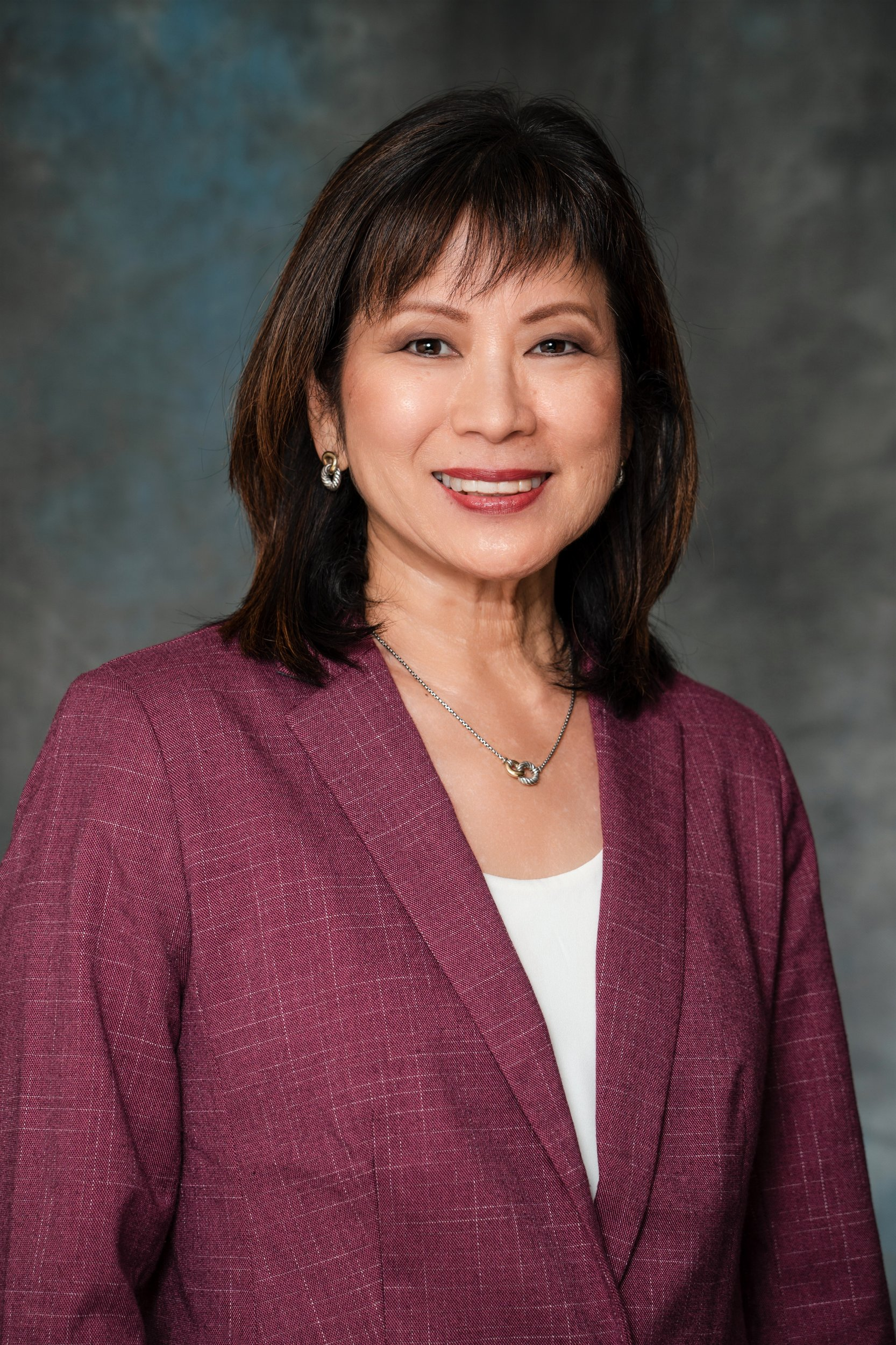

11th Speaker of the Hawaii House of Representatives
- Incumbent
- Assumed office November 6, 2024
- Preceded by: Scott Saiki

Majority Leader of the Hawaii House of Representatives
- In office November 8, 2022 – November 6, 2024
- Preceded by: Della Au Belatti
- Succeeded by: Sean Quinlan

Member of the Hawaii House of Representatives from the 15th district 14th (2016–2022)
- Incumbent
- Assumed office November 8, 2016
- Preceded by: Derek Kawakami

Personal details
- Born: December 1, 1961 (age 64) Honolulu, Hawaii, U.S.
- Party: Democratic
- Education: University of Southern California (BS); University of Hawaiʻi at Mānoa (MURP)

Nadine Kuniko Nakamura (née Maeda, born December 1, 1961) is an American politician serving as a member of the Hawaii House of Representatives from District 15, encompassing east and north Kauaʻi, from Wailua to Haena. She won the seat after incumbent Democrat Derek Kawakami decided to run for a seat in the Kauaʻi County Council. Nakamura won re-election in 2020 against Republican candidate Steve Monas, 76.2% to 23.8%. She won re-election in 2022 against Republican candidate Greg Bentley, 67.9% to 24%. In 2024, she became Speaker of the Hawaii House of Representatives, becoming the first woman to hold the role.

== Early life and education ==
Nakamura was born in Honolulu, the youngest of four children of Hiroyoshi and Mabel Maeda. In 1979, Nakamura graduated from Radford High School in Honolulu. Nakamura then attended the University of Southern California (USC) where she obtained a Bachelor of Science, Public Affairs and Urban Planning in 1983.

While at USC, Nakamura spent a semester in Washington, D.C. where she worked as an intern at Neighborhood Reinvestment Corp. (now NeighborWorks America) which promotes reinvestment in communities by local financial institutions working cooperatively with residents and local government. She earned a Master of Urban and Regional Planning at the University of Hawaiʻi at Mānoa in 1987.

Nakamura successfully ran for the Aliamanu/Salt Lake/Foster Village Neighborhood Board 18 in 1984.

== Career ==
=== State of Hawaiʻi House of Representatives ===
In 2016, Nadine Nakamura was elected to the State of Hawaiʻi House of Representatives for District 14. She has served as Chair of the Committee on Housing and members of the Committees on Judiciary, Transportation, Health and Human Services, Economic Development, Tourism, and Finance. She currently serves as Majority Leader.

=== State of Hawaiʻi, Kauaʻi County ===
From 2013 to 2016, Nadine Nakamura was the Managing Director for the County of Kauaʻi under Mayor Bernard P. Carvalho Jr.

In 2010 Nadine Nakamura was elected to the Kauaʻi County Council, where she served until 2013. Nakamura served as the Vice Chair of the council, Chair of the Planning Committee, and Vice Chair of the Finance and Economic Development Committee.

=== Business experience ===
Nadine Nakamura founded NKN Project Planning, a planning consulting firm in 1992. While at NKN Project Planning, she was responsible for notable community endeavors, some of which include:

- Co-developed the Kauaʻi Planning & Action Alliance, a Kauaʻi-based nonprofit that brings together diverse organizations for collaborative planning and action to achieve targeted community goals.
- Co-founded Hawaiʻi HomeOwnership Center, which provides education, information and support to create successful first-time homeowners in Hawaiʻi. By addressing barriers and increasing rates of home ownership, the HomeOwnership Center aims to build stronger families and communities throughout the state of Hawaiʻi.
- Developed “Lāwaʻi Kai Special Subzone Master Plan and Management Plan” for the National Tropical Botanical Garden. The plan was awarded the Environment/Preservation Award, 2011 by the American Planning Association, Hawai`i Chapter.

=== Non-profit experience ===
From 1991 to 1992, Nakamura was a Project Coordinator with Pacific Housing Assistance Corp. where she helped to develop special needs affordable housing for the elderly and individuals with mental and developmental disabilities.

From 1985 to 1987, Nakamura was a development coordinator with the Neighborhood Reinvestment Corp., which promotes reinvestment in urban, suburban and rural communities by local financial institutions working cooperatively with residents and local government.

=== Other government experience ===
Nakamura was a planner with the City and County of Honolulu Department of Land Utilization (1989–1991) and a transportation planner with the Department of Transportation (1987–1989).

Nakamura was a planner/staff researcher with the Hawaiʻi Community Development Authority (1984–1985), a public entity created by the Hawaiʻi State Legislature to establish community development plans in community development districts; determine community development programs; and cooperate with private enterprise and federal, state, and county governments to bring community development plans to fruition.

== Community involvement ==
- Board Member, Hawaiʻi Community Reinvestment Corporation, July 2005–August 2013
- Member, American Planning Association, 1986–2008
- Chair, Kapaʻa Middle School Community Council, August 2008 – 2010
- Board Member, Kauaʻi Island Utility Cooperative Foundation, August 2007 – 2010
- Member, County of Kauaʻi, Cost Control Commission, 2008–2010
- Vice Chair, Board Member, Hawaiʻi Tourism Authority, July 2002–June 2006
- Chair, Kapaʻa Elementary School Community Council, August 2003 – 2008
- Member, Kauaʻi Planning & Action Alliance, 2003–2010
- Member, Kauaʻi Chamber of Commerce, 2005–2010
- Member, Kapaʻa Elementary School PTSA, 2000–2010
- Member, Kapaʻa Middle School PTSA, 2006–2010
- Parent Member, Kapaʻa Elementary School, School Community Based Management Council, 2001–2005
- Member, Kapaʻa Business Association, 2005–2006
- Vice Chair, State Housing and Community Development Corporation of Hawaiʻi, July 1999–June 2002
- Advisory Council, Kauaʻi Workforce Investment Act Youth Council, 2001–2002
- Director, State Housing Finance and Development Corporation, July 1995–July 1998

Hawaii House of Representatives
Preceded by Della Au Belatti	Majority Leader of the Hawaii House of Representatives; 2022–2024	Succeeded by Sean Quinlan
Political offices
Preceded by Scott Saiki	Speaker of the Hawaii House of Representatives; 2024–present	Incumbent
