= Jeanné Kapela =

American politician

Member of the Hawaii House of Representatives from the 5th district
- Incumbent
- Assumed office November 3, 2020
- Preceded by: Richard Creagan

Personal details
- Born: 1994 or 1995 (age 31–32) Kailua-Kona, Hawaii, U.S.
- Party: Democratic
- Education: Kapiʻolani Community College
- Profession: Politician; beauty pageant titleholder

Jeanné M. Kapela is an American politician and beauty pageant titleholder who has represented Hawaii's fifth district in the Hawaii House of Representatives since 2020. A Democrat, Kapela also was previously crowned Miss Hawaii 2015 and competed in Miss America 2016.

== Early life and education ==
Kapela is a native of Kailua-Kona, Hawaii. Her father is Clifford Gaspar and her mother is Keahi Kapela. She was raised by her maternal grandmother Barbara Kapela on a coffee farm in Captain Cook, Hawaii, where the family lived in poverty.

Kapela is a 2012 graduate of Konawaena High School in Kealakekua, Hawaii, and attended Kapiʻolani Community College in Honolulu.

== Pageantry ==
In November 2013, Kapela won the Miss Kona Coffee title then competed in the 2014 Miss Hawaii pageant. She performed a lyrical dance during the talent competition and her platform was "Support Our Students: Empowering Hawaii's Youth to Achieve Their Dreams". Kapela was named was second runner-up for the state title.

In October 2014, Kapela was crowned Miss Kaka'ako 2015 which made her eligible to compete at the 2015 Miss Hawaii pageant. Entering the state pageant in May 2015 as one of 29 finalists, Kapela's preliminary competition talent was a lyrical dance routine to "My Heart Will Go On" as performed by Tioni Tam Sing. She won both the talent and swimsuit portions of the competition. Her platform, "Sex Trafficking: #ItEndsWithUs" is a campaign to raise awareness of human trafficking. Kapela is the executive director of the non-profit organization UNITE! dedicated to preventing human trafficking.

Kapela won the statewide competition on Saturday, May 30, 2015, when she received her crown from outgoing Miss Hawaii titleholder Stephanie Steuri. Kapela dedicated her victory to the memory of her grandmother. Kapela earned more than $30,000 in scholarship money and a new automobile from Cutter Ford for winning the state pageant. As Miss Hawaii, her activities include public appearances across the state.

Kapela was Hawaii's representative at the Miss America 2016 pageant in Atlantic City, New Jersey, in September 2015. In the televised finale on September 13, 2015, she placed outside the Top 15 semi-finalists and was eliminated from competition. She was awarded a $3,000 scholarship prize as her state's representative. In addition, Kapela was awarded a $2,000 scholarship for her selection as Miss Congeniality by her fellow contestants.

== Political career ==
In 2020, Kapela won the Democratic nomination for district 5 of the Hawaii House of Representatives. She was later elected to the seat in the 2020 Hawaii House of Representatives election, and took office on November 6, 2020.

Awards and achievements
Preceded by Stephanie Steuri	Miss Hawaii; 2015	Succeeded by Allison Chu
