= Tyson Miyake =

American politician

Tyson K. Miyake

Member of the Hawaii House of Representatives from the 10th district
- Incumbent
- Assumed office December 15, 2023
- Appointed by: Josh Green
- Preceded by: Troy Hashimoto

Personal details
- Born: 1981 or 1982 (age 43–44)
- Party: Democratic
- Education: University of Nevada, Las Vegas

Tyson Kawika Miyake is an American politician and a Democratic member of the Hawaii House of Representatives. He was nominated by Governor Josh Green to replace Troy Hashimoto. He was formerly the former chief of staff to Mayor of Maui Mike Victorino.
