= Joe Gedeon (politician) =

American politician (born 1979)

Member of the Hawaii House of Representatives from the 18th district
- Incumbent
- Assumed office May 28, 2025
- Appointed by: Josh Green
- Preceded by: Gene Ward

Personal details
- Born: June 18, 1979 (age 47) Honolulu, Hawai'i
- Party: Republican
- Education: Kapiʻolani Community College; ITT Technical Institute
- Website: Legislature page

Michel Joseph "Joe" Gedeon is an American marketing executive and politician serving as a member of the Hawaii House of Representatives representing the 18th district since 2025. A Republican, he was appointed to succeed Gene Ward, who resigned due to health issues and died shortly after. Gedeon has launched his campaign to retain the District 18 seat.

== Early life and education ==
Gedeon was raised in Hawaiʻi Kai, where he earned the rank of Eagle Scout. He attended Kamiloiki Elementary School, Niu Valley Intermediate, and graduated from Kaiser High School in 1997. He then graduated from Kapiʻolani Community College and ITT Technical Institute in San Diego.

== Career ==
He is the co-founder of marketing and advertising companies JPG Hawaii and JPG Media. He was president of the Waikiki Rotary Club from 2016 to 2017, and is on the board of directors of the American Advertising Federation of Hawaiʻi and the Central YMCA. He has also been involved in the Chamber of Commerce Hawaii, the Hawaii Lodging and Tourism Association, the Hawaii Food Industry Association and the Hawaii Restaurant Association. He is a former communications officer for Saint Louis School and produced and contributed to 808 State Update, a weekly conservative talk radio show.

=== Hawaii House of Representatives ===
Gedeon was appointed on May 28, 2025, by Governor Josh Green to succeed Gene Ward, who resigned due to health issues then died. He was one of three candidates nominated for the seat by the Hawaii Republican Party and will serve Ward's term through 2026.
