= Lahaina Cannery Mall =

Shopping mall in Maui, Hawaii, U.S.

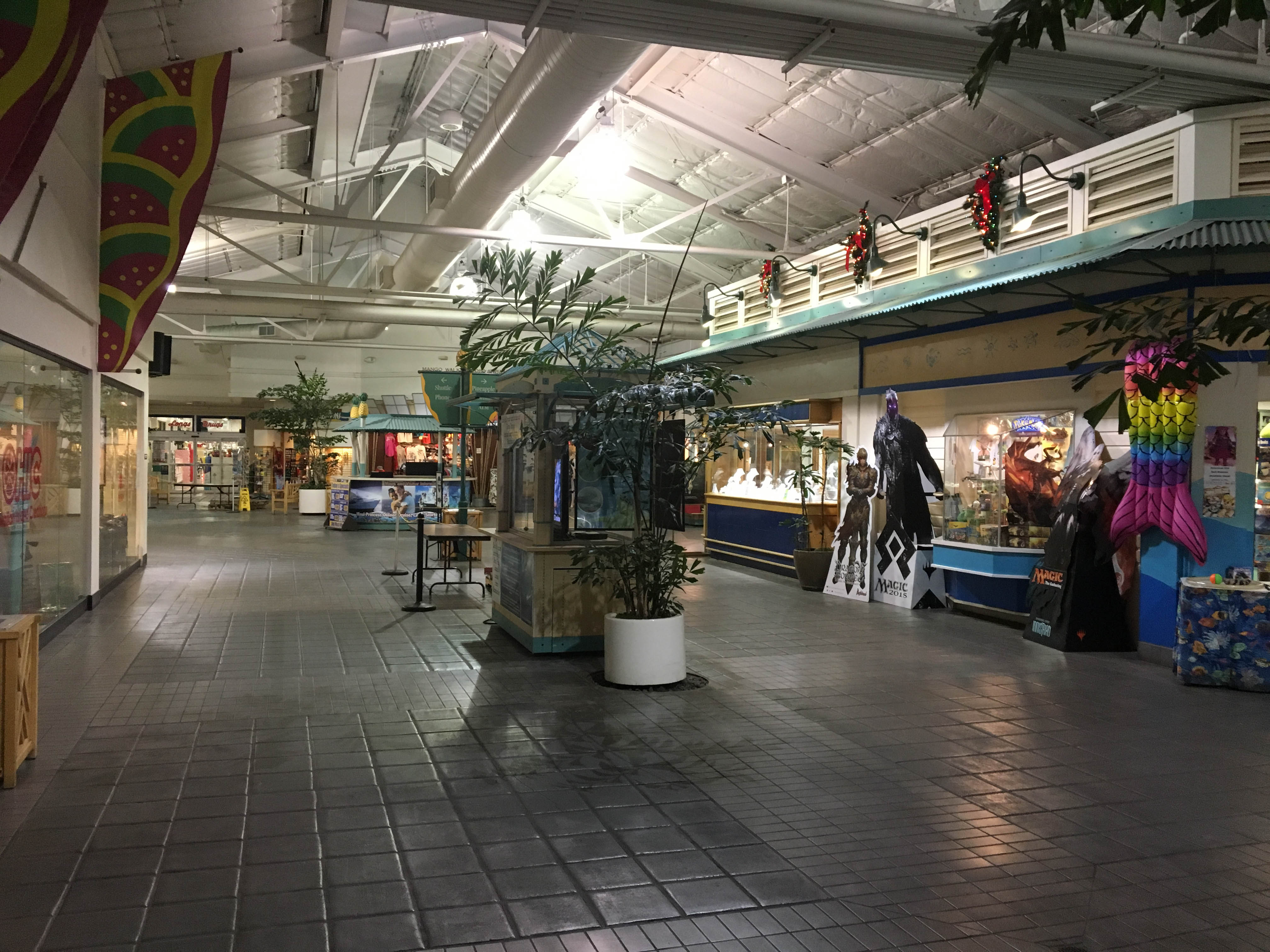
- Interior view (November 2017)
- Location: Lahaina, Hawaii, United States
- Opened: 1987
- Developer: Hawaii Omori Inc.
- Owner: U.S. Reality Partners Inc.
- Num. of stores: 28
- Num. of anchor tenants: 2
- Floor area: 120,000 square feet (11,000 m^{2})
- Floors: 1

Lahaina Cannery Mall is a shopping mall located in Maui, Hawaii. It is the island's only fully enclosed, air-conditioned mall, and encompasses 120,000 square feet (11,000 m^{2}). It has more than 50 boutiques, restaurants and specialty shops. Opened in 1987, the mall boasts a variety of boutique retail stores, combined with casual restaurants and an international food court. The mall is also anchored by a 24-hour Safeway grocery store and a Longs Drugs store.

== History ==
West Maui's roots in the historic pineapple industry began in 1912, when Scottish ranch manager David T. Fleming began growing pineapple at Honolua Ranch, which became Baldwin Packers in 1924. The company grew pineapple at Honolua Ranch, and then canned it less than a mile from Lahaina harbor. Tons of the exotic, succulent fruit were processed and canned at the historic Baldwin Packers pineapple cannery.

The Baldwins' growing and canning operations in Lahaina continued for many decades. However, in 1962 the Baldwins' east and west Maui holdings and pineapple operations were combined when Baldwin Packers merged with Maui Pineapple Company, both being Baldwin family firms. It was around that time that the Baldwin Packers pineapple cannery in west Maui was closed.

Beginning in the mid-1980s, plans were established for a shopping center on the site of the old cannery. When developer Hawaii Omori Inc. began planning on the shopping center, the first idea was to reuse the Baldwin Packers cannery. When that proved impractical, the distinctive corrugated style and factory-like open conduits inside were adopted for the design. When the mall opened in 1987, it was designed to resemble a pineapple cannery.
