= Mark Hashem =

American politician

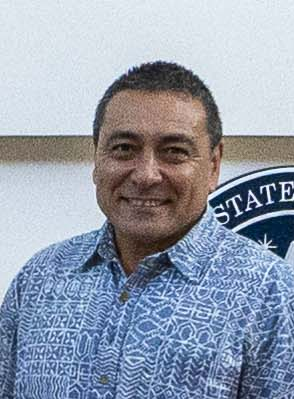
- Hashem in 2023

Member of the Hawaii House of Representatives from the 19th district 18th (2010–2022)
- Incumbent
- Assumed office November 2, 2010
- Preceded by: Lyla Berg

Personal details
- Born: March 3, 1968 (age 58) Hokkaido, Japan
- Party: Democratic
- Education: Pacific University; Hokkaido University (MA)

Mark Jun Hashem (born March 3, 1968) is an American politician and a Democratic member of the Hawaii House of Representatives since November 2, 2010, currently representing District 19.

== Early life and education ==
Hashem was born in Hokkaido, Japan, and moved to Hawaiʻi at the age of 3. He is of Lebanese and Japanese descent on his mother's side. He graduated from McKinley High School in 1986, then earned a bachelor's degree from Pacific University in 1992 and a Master of Arts from Hokkaido University.

== Career ==
While attending Hokkaido University, Hashem operated an elementary English school and founded NineBall Billiards Japan, a billiards supply network in Sapporo. He then worked for state representative Kyle Yamashita as a legislative aide.

== Elections ==
- 2012 Hashem was unopposed for the August 11, 2012 Democratic Primary, winning with 5,010 votes, and won the November 6, 2012 General election with 7,311 votes (56.3%) against Republican nominee Jeremy Low.
- 2010 When Democratic Representative Lyla Berg ran for Lieutenant Governor of Hawaii and left the District 18 seat open, Hashem won the three-way September 18, 2010 Democratic Primary with 2,525 votes (37.9%), and won the November 2, 2010 General election with 4,876 votes (48.4%) against Republican nominee Chris Baron.
