= Sue Lee Loy =

American politician

Sue Keohokapu-Lee Loy

Member of the Hawaii House of Representatives from the 2nd district
- Incumbent
- Assumed office November 5, 2024
- Preceded by: Richard Onishi

Personal details
- Born: Oahu
- Party: Democratic
- Spouse: Ian Lee Loy (div. 2024)
- Education: Hawai‘i Community College; University of Hawai‘i at Hilo

Susan Lokelani Keohokapu-Lee Loy, also known as Sue Lee Loy, is an American politician serving as a member of the Hawaii House of Representatives for the 2nd district since 2024. A Democrat, she previously served on the Hawaii County Council from 2016 to 2024.

== Early life and education ==
Lee Loy was born on Oahu to David Keohokapu, a longshoreman, and Patricia, a nurse, and the family moved to the Big Island in 1974. Raised in Hilo, Lee Loy attended Waiakea High School, Hawai‘i Community College, and the University of Hawai‘i at Hilo.

== Hawaii House of Representatives ==
She moved into a rented home in the district shortly before announcing her campaign, prompting residency concerns. An objection was filed to the Hawaii Office of Elections by six petitioners, including three former sisters-in-law, claiming Lee Loy still lived in the home she shared with ex-husband Ian Lee Loy. State Elections Officer Scott Nago ruled that Lee Loy was in compliance with residency laws.

== Personal life ==
Lee Loy's husband, Ian, filed for divorce in February 2024. The two co-parent a child with special needs.
