= Cov Ratcliffe =

American politician

M. Cov Ratcliffe

Member of the Hawaii House of Representatives from the 28th district
- Incumbent
- Assumed office April 13, 2026
- Appointed by: Josh Green
- Preceded by: Daniel Holt

Personal details
- Party: Democratic
- Education: California State University, East Bay (BA)
- Website: capitol.hawaii.gov/legislature/memberpage.aspx?member=311&year=2026

Michael Covenant (Cov) Ratcliffe is an American politician and labor law attorney serving as a member of the Hawaii House of Representatives representing the 28th district since 2026. A Democrat, he was appointed to succeed Daniel Holt, who resigned on February 14, 2026 to take a position with the Hawaii Department of Land and Natural Resources.

== Early life and education ==
Ratcliffe was born and raised on Kaua'i and is the son of a Mexican immigrant. He graduated from Kauai High School. He attended California State University, East Bay, earning a Bachelor of Arts in Philosophy and History, before returning to Honolulu to attend the University of Hawaiʻi William S. Richardson School of Law. During his legal studies, he worked for the Hawaiʻi Attorney General's Appellate Division and served as an extern for Associate Justice Sabrina S. McKenna of the Hawaiʻi Supreme Court.

Ratcliffe's father, J. Michael Ratcliffe, is also an attorney and was recognized by AARP Hawaii in 2019 for his leadership in founding the Seniors Law Program, the Kauai Elder Abuse Council, and the J&B Ratcliffe Foundation.

== Career ==
Following law school, Ratcliffe served as a law clerk for the Honorable Associate Judge Kimberly Tsumoto Guidry of the Hawaiʻi Intermediate Court of Appeals. As a labor attorney, he has represented various public sector unions, emphasizing economic fairness and workers' rights in his practice.

Prior to his legislative appointment, Ratcliffe served on the Kalihi-Pālama Neighborhood Board.

=== Hawaii House of Representatives ===
On April 13, 2026, Governor Josh Green announced Ratcliffe's appointment to the state legislature. He was selected from a list of three candidates submitted by the Democratic Party of Hawaiʻi. He is scheduled to serve the remainder of the term through November 2026, with his official oath of office set for April 14, 2026.
