= Sean Quinlan =

American politician

Majority Leader of the Hawaii House of Representatives
- Incumbent
- Assumed office November 6, 2024
- Preceded by: Nadine Nakamura

Member of the Hawaii House of Representatives from the 47th district
- Incumbent
- Assumed office November 8, 2016
- Preceded by: Feki Pouha

Personal details
- Born: 孔翔 (Chinese); August 7, 1982 (age 43) British Hong Kong
- Party: Democratic
- Education: George Mason University (attended)

Sean Anthony Quinlan (born August 7, 1982) is an American politician currently serving as a Democratic member of the Hawaii House of Representatives for the 47th district. He is a member of the Economic Development committee, the Education committee, the Higher Education and Technology committee, and the Labor and Tourism committee.

== Early life and education ==
Quinlan was born in Hong Kong where his father was working as a toy industry executive. He grew up on Long Island, New York where he received his GED. While attending George Mason University, where he studied history and political science, he took time off to work teaching English in Beijing, China then moved to the North Shore area of Oʻahu after his parents moved there.

Hawaii House of Representatives
Preceded by Nadine Nakamura	Majority Leader of the Hawaii House of Representatives; 2024–present	Incumbent
