= Kyle Yamashita =

American politician (born 1959)

- Yamashita in 2023

Member of the Hawaii House of Representatives from the 12th district
- Incumbent
- Assumed office November 2, 2004
- Preceded by: Kika Bukoski

Personal details
- Born: September 2, 1959 (age 67)
- Party: Democratic
- Spouse: Karen Masayo Yamashita
- Children: 2
- Education: Leeward Community College

Kyle Taka Yamashita (born September 2, 1959) is an American politician and a Democratic member of the Hawaii House of Representatives since November 2, 2004 representing District 12.

== Elections ==
- 2012 Yamashita was unopposed for the August 11, 2012 Democratic Primary, winning with 3,686 votes, and won the November 6, 2012 General election with 7,457 votes (73.3%) against Republican nominee Ekolu Kalama.
- 2002 With Democratic Representative Hermina Morita redistricted to District 14, Yamashita was unopposed for the District 12 September 21, 2002 Democratic Primary, winning with 2,391 votes, but lost the November 5, 2002 General election to Incumbent Republican Kika Bukoski.
- 2004 Yamashita won the September 18, 2004 Democratic Primary with 2,059 votes (59.3%), and incumbent Representative Bukoski was unopposed for the Republican Primary, setting up a rematch; Yamashita won the November 2, 2004 General election with 5,157 votes (51.1%) against Bukoski.
- 2006 Yamashita was unopposed for the September 26, 2006 Democratic Primary, winning with 4,023 votes, and won the November 7, 2006 General election with 6,681 votes (79.4%) against Republican nominee Wesley Goodin.
- 2008 Yamashita won the September 20, 2008 Democratic Primary with 2,605 votes (58.9%), and won the November 4, 2008 General election with 7,151 votes (66.1%) against Republican nominee Mickey Vierra.
- 2010 Yamashita was unopposed for the September 18, 2010 Democratic Primary, winning with 3,950 votes, and won the November 2, 2010 General election with 6,242 votes (69.9%) against Republican nominee Laurie Rinaldi.
