= Chris Toshiro Todd =

American politician

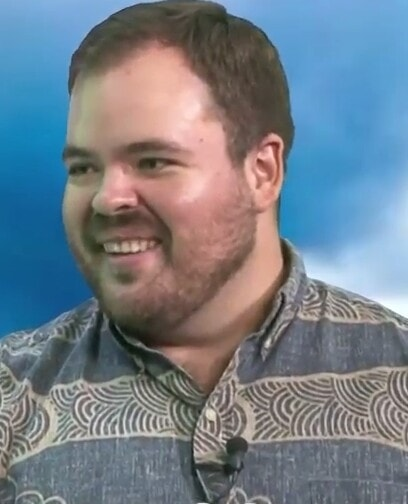

Member of the Hawaii House of Representatives
- Incumbent
- Assumed office January 5, 2017
- Appointed by: David Ige
- Preceded by: Clift Tsuji
- Constituency: 2nd District (2017–2022); 3rd District (2022–Present)

Personal details
- Born: 1987 or 1988 (age 38–39) Hilo, Hawaii
- Party: Democratic
- Spouse: Britney R. Carey
- Education: University of Hawaii at Hilo
- Website: capitol.hawaii.gov

Christopher L. Toshiro (Chris) Todd is an American politician and a Democratic member of the Hawaii House of Representatives since January 2017, currently representing District 3 (Hilo). Todd was appointed by Governor David Ige on January 5, 2017, to replace the late Clift Tsuji.

== Education ==
Todd earned his BA in economics and political science from the University of Hawaii at Hilo and is a 2006 graduate of Hilo High School.

== Electoral history ==
=== 2018 ===
Hawaii 2nd State Representative District Democratic Primary, 2018
Party	Candidate	Votes	%
Democratic	Chris Toshiro Todd	4,305	73.0
Democratic	Terri L. Napeahi	1,592	27.0
Total votes		5,897	100.0

Hawaii 2nd State Representative District General Election, 2018
Party	Candidate	Votes	%
Democratic	Chris Toshiro Todd	6,692	83.28
Republican	Grace Manipol-Larson	1,344	16.72
Total votes		8,036	100.0

=== 2020 ===
Hawaii 2nd State Representative District Democratic Primary, 2020
Party	Candidate	Votes	%
Democratic	Chris Toshiro Todd (incumbent)	3,977	100.0
Total votes		3,977	100.0

Hawaii 2nd State Representative District General Election, 2020
Party	Candidate	Votes	%
Democratic	Chris Toshiro Todd (incumbent)	9,552	85.74
Aloha ʻĀina	Devin Shaw McMackin	1,589	14.26
Total votes		11,141	100.0

=== 2022 ===
Hawaii 3rd State Representative District Democratic Primary, 2022
Party	Candidate	Votes	%
Democratic	Chris Toshiro Todd (incumbent)	2,620	62.57
Democratic	Shannon Lopeka Matson	1,567	37.43
Total votes		4,187	100.0

Hawaii 3rd State Representative District General Election, 2022
Party	Candidate	Votes	%
Democratic	Chris Toshiro Todd (incumbent)	5,191	80.86
Aloha ʻĀina	Devin Shaw McMackin	1,229	19.14
Total votes		6,420	100.0
