= Green Party of Hawaii =

Hawaii affiliate of the Green Party

Green Party of Hawaiʻi ʻAoʻao ʻōmaʻomaʻo o Hawaiʻi
- Chairperson: Sylvia Litchfield; Budd Dickinson
- Founded: May 30, 1992
- Headquarters: Honolulu, Hawaii, U.S.
- Ideology: Green politics Hawaiian sovereignty
- Political position: Left-wing
- National affiliation: Green Party of the United States
- Colors: Green
- State House: 1 / 51
- State Senate: 0 / 25
- Statewide Executive Offices: 0 / 2
- U.S. House of Representatives (Hawaii seats): 0 / 2
- U.S. Senate (Hawaii seats): 0 / 2
- Other elected officials: 0 (February 2024)

Website
- Official website

The Green Party of Hawaiʻi (GPH; Hawaiian: ʻAoʻao ʻōmaʻomaʻo o Hawaiʻi) is the green party organization in the state of Hawaii, and an affiliate organization of the Green Party of the United States.

The party's focus includes environmental issues, community-based economics, personal responsibility, diversity, social justice, and non-violence.

== History ==
The Hawaii Green Party first qualified for the ballot in May 1992, one of the earliest state Green Parties to do so; the first was Alaska, followed by California and New Mexico.

On April 22, 1992, the party submitted more than 8,000 petition signatures to state election officials in an effort to qualify for that year's ballot; approximately 4,500 signatures were required. By early May, the party had qualified for the ballot. Contemporary coverage identified Linda Martin and Ira Rohter as co-chairs and reported that the party was seeking candidates from community organizations.

The party fielded 18 candidates in the 1992 elections, including candidates for the United States Senate, both houses of the state legislature, mayoral offices, and county council seats.

In November 1992, Keiko Bonk was elected to a seat on the Hawaii County (Big Island) County Council, the first Green to be elected in a partisan race in the United States. She was re-elected in 1994, but stepped down to run unsuccessfully for Island Mayor in 1996.In the November 1992 election, Green Party candidate Linda Martin received approximately 13 percent of the vote in the United States Senate race, a result that qualified the party for automatic ballot access in 1994. The Honolulu Star-Bulletin also reported Keiko Bonk-Abramson's victory over incumbent Robert Makuakane in the South Kona–Kaʻū–Upper Puna district of the Hawaiʻi County Council.

In 1994, educator Michael Kioni Dudley campaigned for governor as a Green, emphasizing the cost of living, environmental protection, Hawaiian sovereignty, and public education. Dudley received approximately 4 percent of the general-election vote, below the 10 percent threshold then required for automatic ballot status in the following election. The party therefore faced another petition drive to appear on the 1996 ballot. Bonk-Abramson, meanwhile, was re-elected to the Hawaiʻi County Council in 1994.

In September 1997, state elections officials confirmed that the party had qualified for ballot status for the next ten years under a law applicable to parties qualifying in three consecutive general elections. The decision entitled it to appear automatically on ballots for the next five general elections.

In November 1998, Julie Jacobson was elected to Bonk's old seat on the Big Island, which she held upon re-election in 2000. Her campaign for election was managed by Bonk. When she decided not to run in 2002, her husband Bob Jacobson ran and was elected, then re-elected again in 2004 and 2006. Jacobson lost in 2008. No Green Party members have since held elected office in Hawaii.

In March 2007, the Honolulu Star-Bulletin reported that the party no longer qualified for automatic inclusion on the 2008 ballot because it had not received enough votes in the 2006 elections. Party representatives said they intended to collect petition signatures to regain ballot access.

In 2012, the Green Party of Hawaii was certified to be included on Hawaii partisan election ballots in all races through 2020. The party sued the Chief Election Officer Scott Nago as the state ran out of ballots on election day. A decision in the lawsuit was rendered by the Supreme Court of Hawaii on 19 July 2016.

During the 2026 state elections, the Green Party of Hawaii won its first ever seat in the Hawaii House of Representatives, with Pāʻele Kiakona winning House District 14 by a 107-vote margin.

== Political positions ==
=== Economics ===
The Green Party of Hawai'i called for a sustainable economy with self reliance through a diversified economy from the tourism industry.

During its 1992 campaign, the party set a $250-per-person contribution limit for its candidates and said its candidates would not accept donations from corporations or political action committees.

=== Environment ===
The Green Party of Hawai'i promoted conservation of Hawaiian wildlife and the human impact on the environment. The Greens support the increase of renewable energy sources and decarbonization of transportation and energy. Land and water use are concerns of the party which calls for resources to be balanced. The party has voiced opposition to the introduction of liquefied natural gas as an energy source in the state.

In May 1992, the party announced opposition to a proposed geothermal development on Hawaiʻi Island. At the same time, it initially supported the H-3 freeway on the condition that the route avoid culturally and historically significant sites. A week later, a new party platform statement called for an end to construction of the H-3 route through Hālawa Valley.

=== Hawaiian Sovereignty ===
The Green Party of Hawai'i supported paths towards Hawaiian Sovereignty according to the context of the Apology Resolution and to address the issue of Hawaiian Homelands and military leasing in the state. The party calls for the return of or compensation of the Hawaiian Ceded Lands and the revitalization of Hawaiian culture and its practices.

== See also ==
- Aloha ʻĀina Party of Hawai'i
- Democratic Party of Hawaii
- Hawaii Republican Party
