= Ikaika Olds =

American politician

Member of the Hawaii House of Representatives from the 23rd district
- Incumbent
- Assumed office November 5, 2024
- Preceded by: Scott Nishimoto

Personal details
- Born: 1984 or 1985 (age 41)
- Party: Democratic
- Spouse: Tracy Konn Olds
- Children: 2

Ikaika Mark Olds is an American politician serving as a member of the Hawaii House of Representatives for the 23rd district since 2024. Olds serves as the Vice Chair of the House Human Services and Homelessness Committee and is a member of the Health, Education and Higher Education Committees. He also serves as the Vice Chair of the Keiki Caucus and is a member of the Kupuna and Native Hawaiian Caucuses.

Olds was born and raised in Kailua, Oahu, and attended Kailua High School. Influenced by the September 11 attacks, he enlisted into the US Army immediately after graduating, where he served eight years as an US Army Infantryman with two combat deployments to Iraq during the Iraq War. Upon completing his service, he returned to Hawaii for university and earned a Bachelor's and Master's degrees in Psychology.

Prior to entering politics, Olds worked with Waikiki Health and the Department of Education's Office of Education of Homeless Children and Youth to help the homeless in Honolulu.

Olds has two children.
