= Dee Morikawa =

American politician

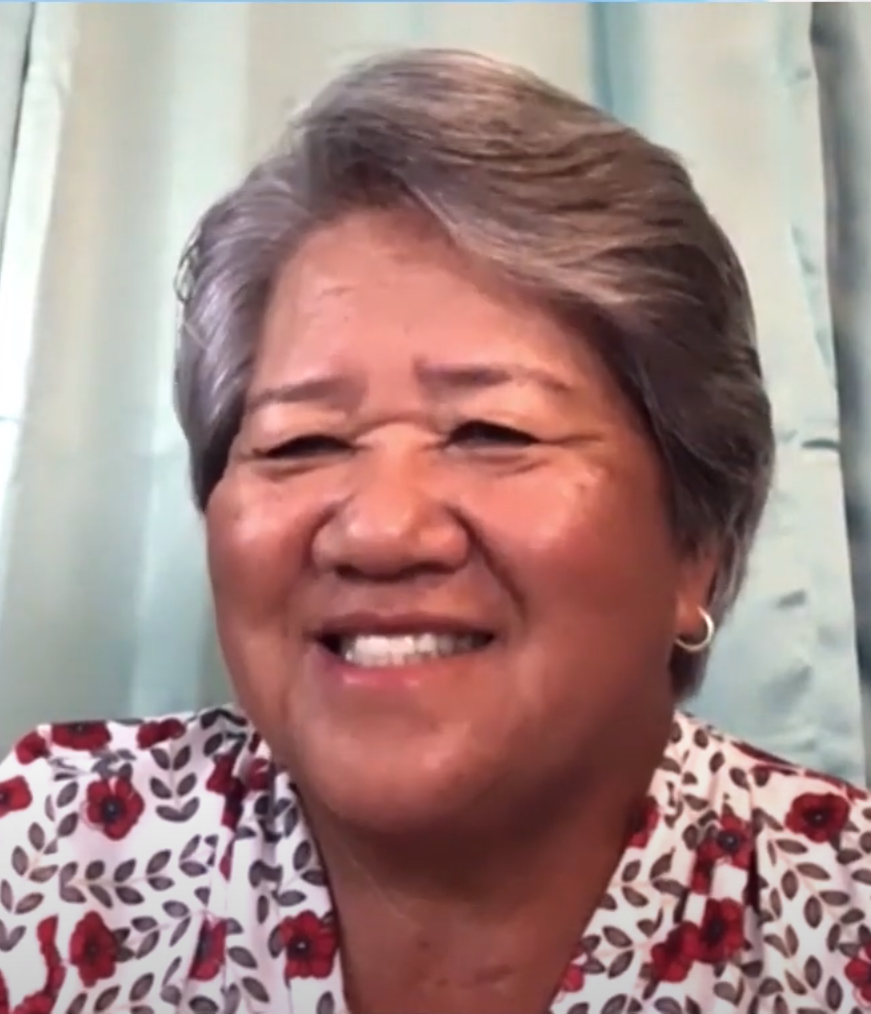

Member of the Hawaii House of Representatives from the 17th district 16th (2010–2012)
- Incumbent
- Assumed office November 2, 2010
- Preceded by: Roland Sagum

Personal details
- Born: September 22, 1956 (age 70) Honokaa
- Party: Democratic
- Spouse: Ken Morikawa
- Children: 4
- Education: Kauaʻi Community College

Daynette Sumie Puanani (Dee) Morikawa (born September 22, 1956) is an American politician and a Democratic member of the Hawaii House of Representatives since November 2, 2010 representing District 17.

== Education ==
Morikawa earned her Associate degree in accounting from Kauaʻi Community College.

== Elections ==
- 2012 Morikawa was unopposed for the August 11, 2012 Democratic Primary, winning with 3,403 votes, and won the November 6, 2012 General election with 6,049 votes (71.4%) against Republican nominee Troy Trujillo.
- 2010 Morikawa challenged incumbent Democratic Representative Roland Sagum in the District 16 (reapportioned to District 17 after the 2020 Census) September 18, 2010 Democratic Primary, winning with 2,657 votes (55.2%), and won the November 2, 2010 General election with 5,450 votes (73.3%) against Republican nominee Phil Sterker.
