= Hawaii Public Utilities Commission =

Regulator of public service companies

The Hawaii Public Utilities Commission (HPUC) is a three-member state public utilities commission, a quasi-judicial tribunal, which regulates over 1,800 public service companies operating in the U.S. state of Hawaii. Established by the Territorial Legislature in 1913, the commission’s primary mission is "Ensuring Hawaii’s public utility consumers have access to essential utilities and services that are delivered in safe, reliable and resilient ways." As of 2024, these utilities and services include electricity, gas, telecommunications, private water and sewage, and motor and water carrier transportation services.

== Commissioners ==
Commissioners are appointed by the Governor and confirmed by the Hawaiʻi State Senate to serve staggered six-year terms (https://puc.hawaii.gov/about/commissioners/). As of April 2026, the commission consists of:

- Jon S. Itomura (Chair): Appointed by Governor Josh Green in early 2026, Itomura brings experience as a former supervising attorney for the Division of Consumer Advocacy.
- Naomi U. Kuwaye (Commissioner): Appointed in July 2022, Kuwaye previously practiced as an attorney specializing in environmental and natural resources law.
- Colin A. Yost (Commissioner): Re-appointed in 2024, Yost has a professional background in renewable energy law and consumer protection.

== Regulated Entities ==
The PUC exercises jurisdiction over all chartered, franchised, or registered public utility companies in the state.

- Electricity: The commission regulates Hawaiian Electric (serving Oʻahu, Maui County, and Hawaiʻi Island) and the Kauaʻi Island Utility Cooperative.
- Gas: Hawaiʻi Gas is the primary regulated entity for utility gas services.
- Transportation: The PUC oversees Young Brothers, LLC, the state's primary inter-island water carrier, as well as Hono Heke and over 1,600 motor carriers.
- Telecommunications: The commission monitors Hawaiian Telcom and over 200 other wireless and wireline providers.
- Water and Wastewater: About 36 private water and sewage treatment companies fall under the commission's rate-making authority.

== Policy focus ==
Following the 2023 Maui wildfires, the PUC has prioritized grid resilience and wildfire mitigation strategies. The commission is also tasked with overseeing the state's transition to 100% renewable energy by 2045, balancing decarbonization goals with the need to maintain affordable utility rates for residents.

In 2017 HPUC authorized smart inverters to increase grid stability.

== Authority and funding ==
The PUC's statutory authority is derived from Hawaiʻi Revised Statutes § 269. The agency is administratively attached to the Department of Commerce and Consumer Affairs (DCCA), but it functions as an independent quasi-judicial body. Its operations are funded through a public utility fee paid by the regulated entities rather than through general tax revenue.
