= Sam Satoru Kong =

American politician (born 1959)

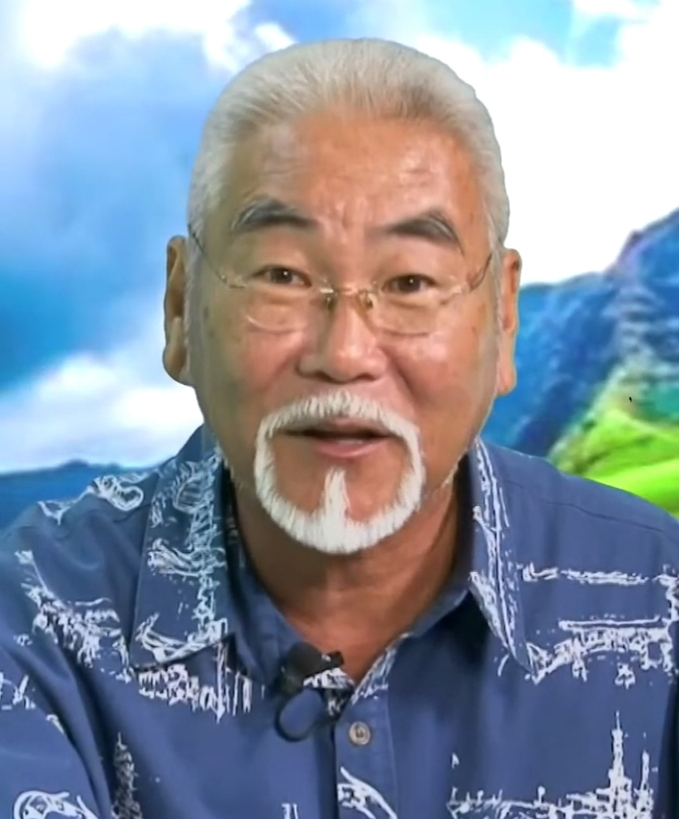

Member of the Hawaii House of Representatives from the 33rd district
- Incumbent
- Assumed office November 2014
- Preceded by: Mark Takai

Personal details
- Born: December 14, 1959 (age 66) Kaimuki, HI
- Party: Democratic (2014–present); Republican (before 2014)
- Spouse: June Kong
- Education: Kalani High School

Samuel Satoru Kong is a Democratic member of the Hawaii House of Representatives, representing the 33rd district. Before entering the legislature he served in the United States Air Force and operated a florist shop and cab company.
