= Hawaii House of Representatives =

Lower house of the Hawaii State Legislature

Coordinates: 21°18′26″N 157°51′26″W

Hawaii House of Representatives Hale o nā Luna Makaʻāinana
- 33rd Hawaii State Legislature

Type
- Type: Lower house
- Term limits: None

Leadership
- Speaker: Nadine Nakamura (D) since November 6, 2024
- Vice Speaker: Linda Ichiyama (D) since November 6, 2024
- Majority Leader: Sean Quinlan (D) since November 6, 2024
- Minority Leader: Lauren Matsumoto (R) since November 8, 2022

Structure
- Seats: 51
- Political groups: Majority: Democratic (44); Minority: Republican (6); Green (1)
- Length of term: 2 years
- Authority: Article III, Constitution of Hawaii
- Salary: $74,160 per year + $225 per diem for non-Oʻahu members (2025)

Elections
- Last election: November 3, 2026 (51 seats)
- Next election: November 7, 2028
- Redistricting: Hawaii Reapportionment Commission

Meeting place
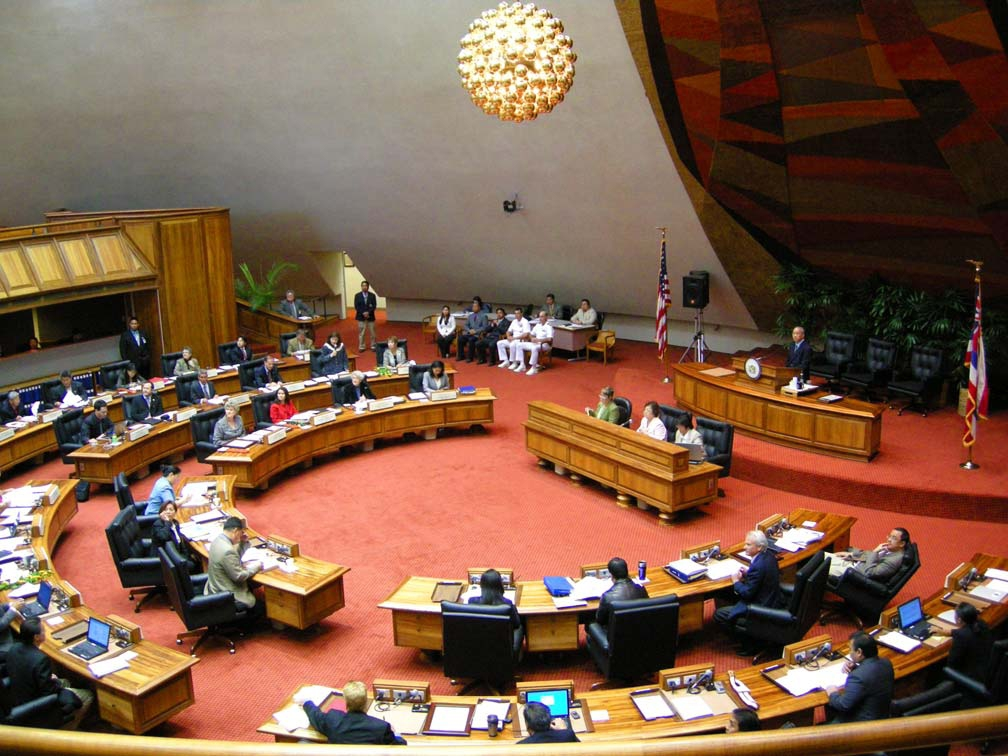
- House of Representatives Chamber; Hawaii State Capitol; Honolulu, Hawaii

Website
- Hawaii House of Representatives

Rules
- Rules of the House of Representatives

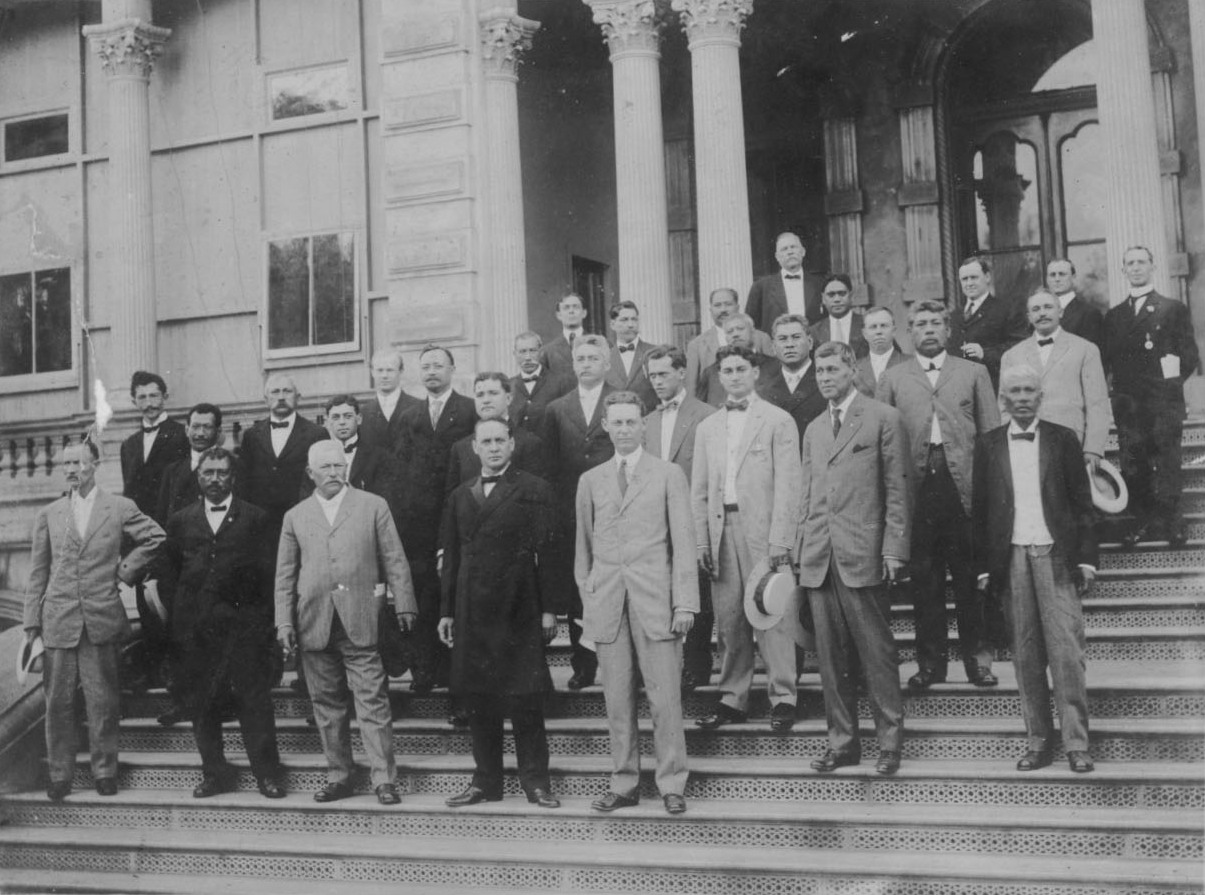
Members and officers of the 1911 Hawaii House of Representatives (Territorial)

The Hawaii House of Representatives (Hawaiian: Hale o nā Luna Makaʻāinana) is the lower house of the Hawaii State Legislature. Pursuant to Article III, Section 3 of the Constitution of Hawaii, amended during the 1978 constitutional convention, the House of Representatives consists of 51 members, each elected in a single member district. It is led by the Speaker of the House elected from the membership of the House, with majority and minority leaders elected from their party's respective caucuses. The current Speaker of the House is Nadine Nakamura.

Legislators are elected to two-year terms and are not subject to term limits. As in many state legislatures in the United States, the Hawaiʻi House of Representatives is a part-time body and legislators often have active careers outside government. The upper house of the legislature is the Hawaii State Senate.

According to Article III, section 4 of the Hawaii State Constitution, a legislator's term begins on the day of the general election and ends the day of the general election if a new member is elected.

The last election took place on November 3, 2026.

== Composition ==
This is a list of individuals serving in the Hawaii House of Representatives following the November 2024 election, as well as the body's leadership.

| Affiliation | Party (Shading indicates majority caucus) | | | Total | |
| Affiliation | Democratic | Republican | Green | Total | Vacant |
|---|---|---|---|---|---|
| End of previous legislature (2026) | 41 | 10 | 0 | 51 | 0 |
| Begin (2027) | 44 | 6 | 1 | 51 | 0 |
| Latest voting share | 86.3% | 11.8% | 2% | | |

=== Leadership ===
| Office | Name | Party | District |
|---|---|---|---|
| Speaker | Nadine Nakamura | Democratic | 15 |
| Vice Speaker | Linda Ichiyama | Democratic | 32 |
| Majority Leader | Sean Quinlan | Democratic | 47 |
| Majority Floor Leader | Dee Morikawa | Democratic | 17 |
| Majority Whip | Amy Perruso | Democratic | 46 |
| Minority Leader | Lauren Matsumoto | Republican | 38 |
| Minority Floor Leader | Diamond Garcia | Republican | 42 |
| Assistant Minority Leader | David Alcos | Republican | 41 |
| Minority Whip | Kanani Souza | Republican | 43 |

=== Officers ===
| Position | Name |
|---|---|
| Chief Clerk | Brian L. Takeshita |
| Assistant Chief Clerk | Rupert Juarez |
| Sergeant-at-Arms | Rod Tanonaka |
| Assistant Sergeant-at-Arms | Jade Villanueva |

=== List of current members ===
| District | Name | Party | County(ies) | Areas represented | Start |
|---|---|---|---|---|---|
| 1 | Matthias Kusch | Dem | Hawaiʻi | Hāmākua, portion of Hilo, Ka‘ūmana | 2024 (Note: Originally appointed.) |
| 2 | Sue Lee Loy | Dem | Hawaiʻi | Hilo | 2024 |
| 3 | Chris Toshiro Todd | Dem | Hawaiʻi | Portion of Hilo, Keaukaha, Orchidlands Estate, Ainaloa, Hawaiian Acres, Fern Acres, portions of Kurtistown and Keaʻau | 2017 |
| 4 | Greggor Ilagan | Dem | Hawaiʻi | Hawaiian Paradise Park, Hawaiian Beaches, Nānāwale Estates, Leilani Estates | 2020 |
| 5 | Jeanné Kapela | Dem | Hawaiʻi | Portions of Keaʻau and Kurtistown, Mountain View, Glenwood, Fern Forest, Volcano, Pāhala, Punalu‘u, Nā‘ālehu, Wai‘ōhinu, Hawaiian Ocean View, Ho‘okena | 2020 |
| 6 | Kirstin Kahaloa | Dem | Hawaiʻi | Hōnaunau, Nāpo‘opo‘o, Captain Cook, Kealakekua, Keauhou, Hōlualoa, Kailua-Kona | 2022 |
| 7 | Nicole Lowen | Dem | Hawaiʻi | Kailua-Kona, Honokōhau, Kalaoa, Pu‘uanahulu, Puakō, portion of Waikōloa | 2012 |
| 8 | David Tarnas | Dem | Hawaiʻi | Hawi, Hala‘ula, Waimea, Makahalau, Waiki‘i, Waikōloa, Kawaihae, and Māhukona | 2018 (Note: Tarnas previously served in the state house from 1994–1998.) |
| 9 | Justin Woodson | Dem | Maui | Kahului, Puʻunēnē, portion of Wailuku | 2013 |
| 10 | Tyson Miyake | Dem | Maui | Portion of Waiehu, Paukukalo, Wailuku, Wailuku Heights, Waikapu | 2023 |
| 11 | Terez Amato | Dem | Maui | Portion of Māʻalaea, Kīhei, Keawakapu, Wailea, Mākena, Kanahena, Keone‘ō‘io | 2022 |
| 12 | Kyle Yamashita | Dem | Maui | Portion of Keāhua, Hāli‘imaile, Pukalani, Makawao, Pūlehu, Waiakoa, Kēōkea, and ‘Ulupalakua | 2004 |
| 13 | Mahina Poepoe | Dem | Maui, Kalawao | Molokaʻi, Lānaʻi, Kahoʻolawe, portion of Kahului, Ha‘ikū, Pe‘ahi, Huelo, Nāhiku, Hāna, Kīpahulu | 2022 |
| 14 | Pāʻele Kiakona | Green | Maui | Kahakuloa, Waiheʻe, portions of Wai‘ehu and Māʻalaea, Olowalu, Lahaina, Lahainaluna, Kā‘anapali, Māhinahina Camp, Kahana, Honokahua | 2026 |
| 15 | Nadine Nakamura | Dem | Kauaʻi | Hā‘ena, Wainiha, Hanalei, Princeville, Kīlauea, Anahola, Keālia, Kāpa‘a, portion of Wailuā, Kawaihau | 2016 |
| 16 | Luke Evslin | Dem | Kauaʻi | Wailuā, Hanamāʻulu, Kapaia, Līhuʻe, Puhi, portion of ʻŌmaʻo | 2023 |
| 17 | Dee Morikawa | Dem | Kauaʻi | Niʻihau, portion of ʻŌmaʻo, Kōloa, Po‘ipū, Lāwa‘i, Kalāheo, ‘Ele‘ele, Hanapēpē, Kaawanui Village, Pākalā Village, Waimea, Kekaha | 2010 |
| 18 | Jamie Wataru | Dem | Honolulu | Portlock, Hawaiʻi Kai, Kalama Valley | 2026 |
| 19 | Mark Hashem | Dem | Honolulu | Waiʻalae-Kāhala, ʻĀina Haina, Niu Valley, Kuli‘ou‘ou | 2010 |
| 20 | Tina Nakada Grandinetti | Dem | Honolulu | Leahi, Kāhala, Waiʻalae, Kaimukī, Kapahulu | 2024 |
| 21 | Derek Turbin | Dem | Honolulu | St. Louis Heights, Pālolo Valley, Maunalani Heights, Wilhelmina Rise, Kaimukī | 2026 |
| 22 | Andrew Takuya Garrett | Dem | Honolulu | Mānoa | 2022 |
| 23 | Ikaika Olds | Dem | Honolulu | Mōʻiliʻili, McCully | 2024 |
| 24 | Adrian Tam | Dem | Honolulu | Waikīkī | 2020 |
| 25 | Kim Coco Iwamoto | Dem | Honolulu | Ala Moana, Kakaʻako, Downtown Honolulu | 2024 |
| 26 | Ian Ross | Dem | Honolulu | Makiki, Punchbowl | 2026 |
| 27 | Jenna Takenouchi | Dem | Honolulu | Pacific Heights, Nuʻuanu, Liliha | 2022 |
| 28 | Cov Ratcliffe | Dem | Honolulu | Sand Island, Iwilei, Chinatown | 2026 |
| 29 | Ikaika Hussey | Dem | Honolulu | Kamehameha Heights, Kalihi Valley, portion of Kalihi | 2024 |
| 30 | Shirley Ann Templo | Dem | Honolulu | Kalihi, Kalihi Kai, Ke‘ehi Lagoon, Hickam Village | 2024 |
| 31 | Linda Ichiyama | Dem | Honolulu | Fort Shafter Flats, Salt Lake, Pearl Harbor | 2010 |
| 32 | Micah Aiu | Dem | Honolulu | Fort Shafter, Moanalua, Āliamanu, Foster Village, portions of ʻAiea and Hālawa | 2026 (Note: Aiu previously served in the state house from 2022–2024.) |
| 33 | Sam Satoru Kong | Dem | Honolulu | Portion of Hālawa, ʻAiea, Waimalu | 2014 |
| 34 | Gregg Takayama | Dem | Honolulu | Pearl City, Waiau, Pacific Palisades | 2012 |
| 35 | Cory Chun | Dem | Honolulu | Portions of Pearl City and Waipahū, Crestview | 2022 |
| 36 | Daisy Hartsfield | Dem | Honolulu | Waipahū | 2026 |
| 37 | Trish La Chica | Dem | Honolulu | Portions of Mililani Town, Mililani Mauka, Koa Ridge, and Waipiʻo Gentry | 2023 |
| 38 | Lauren Matsumoto | Rep | Honolulu | Portions of Mililani and Waipio Acres, Mililani Mauka | 2012 |
| 39 | Corey Rosenlee | Dem | Honolulu | Royal Kunia, Village Park, Honoʻuliʻuli, Hoʻopili, portion of Waipahū | 2026 |
| 40 | Julie Reyes Oda | Rep | Honolulu | Portions of Lower Village and ʻEwa Beach, Iroquois Point | 2024 |
| 41 | David Alcos | Rep | Honolulu | Portion of ʻEwa Beach, Ocean Pointe, Barbers Point | 2022 |
| 42 | Diamond Garcia | Rep | Honolulu | Portions of Varona Village, Ewa, Kapolei, Fernandez Village | 2022 |
| 43 | Kanani Souza | Rep | Honolulu | Kapolei, Makakilo | 2022 |
| 44 | Darius Kila | Dem | Honolulu | Honokai Hale, Nānākuli, Māʻili | 2022 |
| 45 | Chris Muraoka | Rep | Honolulu | Waiʻanae, Mākaha | 2024 |
| 46 | Amy Perruso | Dem | Honolulu | Portion of Waipio Acres, Launani Valley, Wahiawā, Whitmore Village, Waialua, Mokulēʻia | 2018 |
| 47 | Sean Quinlan | Dem | Honolulu | Waialua, Hale‘iwa, Waialua, Hale‘iwa, Kawailoa Beach, Waimea, Sunset Beach, Waiale‘e, Kawela Bay, Kahuku, Lā‘ie, Hauʻula, Punaluʻu, Kahana | 2016 |
| 48 | Lisa Kitagawa | Dem | Honolulu | Kaʻaʻawa, Kahalu‘u, ‘Āhuimanu, Heʻeia, Kāneʻohe | 2018 |
| 49 | Scot Matayoshi | Dem | Honolulu | Kāneʻohe, Maunawili | 2018 |
| 50 | Mike Lee | Dem | Honolulu | Kailua, portion of Kāneʻohe Bay | 2024 |
| 51 | Lisa Marten | Dem | Honolulu | Waimānalo, Keolu Hills, Lanikai, portion of Kailua | 2020 |

== See also ==
- List of speakers of the Hawaii House of Representatives
- List of vice speakers of the Hawaii House of Representatives
- Majority Leader of the Hawaii House of Representatives
- List of Hawaii state legislatures
