= 2012 Hawaii House of Representatives election =

2012 Hawaii House of Representatives Elections
- November 6, 2012

All 51 seats in the Hawaii House of Representatives.

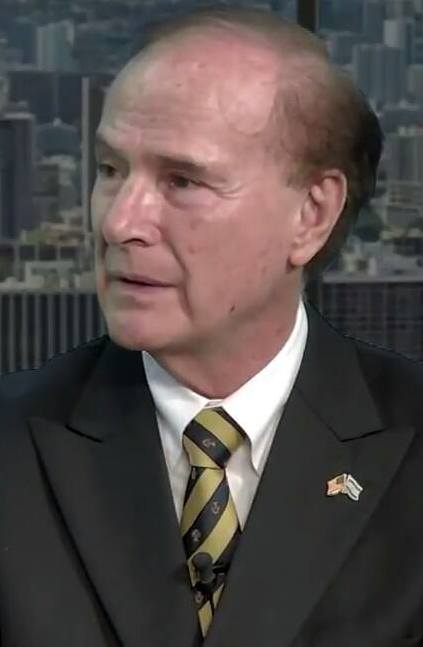
	Majority party	Minority party
Leader	Calvin K.Y. Say	Gene Ward
Party	Democratic	Republican
Leader's seat	District 20	District 17
Last election	43	8
Seats won	44	7
Seat change	▲1	▼1
Popular vote	168,859	81468
Percentage	66.39%	32.03%
- Results: Democratic hold Democratic gain Republican hold Republican gain
Speaker before election
Calvin K.Y. Say
Democratic
Elected Speaker
Joseph M. Souki
Democratic

The 2012 Hawaii State House of Representatives Elections were held on November 6, 2012. All 51 seats were up for election.

A total of 6 (3 Democratic and 3 Republican) seats changed sides as a result of the election. 2 Republican incumbents failed to secure reelection against Democratic opponents. 3 Republicans took advantage of the redistricting and gained seats in districts vacated by incumbents. Democrats also took control of the District 19 seat vacated by retiring Republican Barbara Marumoto-Coons.

== Retiring Incumbents ==
A total of 5 incumbents were retiring.

Incumbent	Party	District	Notes
Jerry Chang	Democratic	District 2	Did not seek reelection.
Robert Herkes	Democratic	District 5	Retired to run for State Senate District 2.
Barbara Marumoto-Coons	Republican	District 19	Did not seek reelection.
Joey Manahan	Democratic	District 29	Did not seek reelection.
Kymberly Pine	Republican	District 43	Retired to run for Honolulu City Council District 1

== Incumbents Defeated in the Primary ==
Due to redistricting, two incumbents were forced to compete with each other for the same district. Democratic Representative Jessica Wooley (District 47) defeated Democratic representative Pono Chong (District 49) for the Democratic nomination in District 48.

Republican Representative Gil Riviere lost his nomination to Richard Fale in the primary. He was the only incumbent to lose a primary.

== Predictions ==
Source	Ranking	As of
Governing	Safe D	October 24, 2012

== Complete List ==
District	Incumbent	Party	First elected	2012 status / Result	Candidates
District 1	Mark Nakashima	Democratic	2009	Re-elected	Mark Nakashima (D)
District 2	Cliff Tsuji; Redistricted from District 3	Democratic	2005	Re-elected	Cliff Tsuji (D)
District 3	Vacant; Incumbent Cliff Tsuji (D) redistricted to District 2			Vacant due to redistricting Democratic Hold	Richard Onishi (D); Marlene Nachbar Hapai (R); Frederick Fogel (L)
District 4	Faye Hanohano	Democratic	2007	Re-elected	Faye Hanohano (D); Hope Louise Carmelj (I); Moke Stephens (I)
District 5	Denny Coffman; Redistricted from District 6	Democratic	2009	Re-elected	Denny Coffman (D); Dave Bateman (R)
District 6	Vacant; Incumbent Denny Coffman (D) redistricted to District 5			Vacant due to redistricting Democratic Hold	Nicole Lowen (D); Roy Ebert (R)
District 7	Cindy Evans	Democratic	2003	Re-elected	Cindy Evans (D)
District 8	Joseph M. Souki	Democratic	1989	Re-elected	Joseph M. Souki (D)
District 9	Gilbert Keith-Agaran	Democratic	2009	Re-elected	Gilbert Keith-Agaran (D)
District 10	Angus McKelvey	Democratic	2007	Re-elected	Angus McKelvey (D); Chayne Marten (R)
District 11	George Fontaine	Republican	2011	Lost re-election Democratic Gain	Kaniela Ing (D); George Fontaine (R)
District 12	Kyle Yamashita	Democratic	2007	Re-elected	Kyle Yamashita (D); Ekolu Kalama (R)
District 13	Diane Mele Carroll	Democratic	2005	Re-elected	Diane Mele Carroll (D); Simon Russell (R)
District 14	Derek Kawakami	Democratic	2011	Re-elected	Derek Kawakami (D)
District 15	James Tokioka	Democratic	2007	Re-elected	James Tokioka (D)
District 16	Daynette Morikawa	Democratic	2011	Re-elected	Daynette Morikawa (D); Troy Trujillo (R)
District 17	Gene Ward	Republican	2007	Re-elected	Gene Ward (R)
District 18	Mark Hashem	Democratic	2011	Re-elected	Mark Hashem (D); Jeremy Low (R)
District 19	Barbara Marumoto-Coons	Republican	1979	Retired; Democratic Gain	Bertrand Kobayashi (D); Darrell Young (R)
District 20	Calvin K.Y. Say	Democratic	1977	Re-elected	Calvin K.Y. Say (D); Julia Allen (R); Keiko Bonk (G); Joseph Heukulani (I)
District 21	Scott Nishimoto	Democratic	2003	Re-elected	Scott Nishimoto (D)
District 22	Tom Brower; Redistricted from District 23	Democratic	2007	Re-elected	Tom Brower (D); Marcus Hester (R)
District 23	Isaac Choy; Redistricted from District 24	Democratic	2009	Re-elected	Isaac Choy (D); Zach Thomson (R)
District 24	Della Au Belatti; Redistricted from District 25	Democratic	2007	Re-elected	Della Au Belatti (D); Isaiaha Kauka Sabey (R)
District 25	Sylvia Luke; Redistricted from District 26	Democratic	1999	Re-elected	Sylvia Luke (D)
District 26	Scott Saiki; Redistricted from District 22	Democratic	1995	Re-elected	Scott Saiki (D); Tiffany Au (R)
District 27	Corinne Ching	Republican	2003	Lost re-election Democratic Gain	Takashi Ohno (D); Corinne Ching (R)
District 28	John Mizuno; Redistricted from District 30	Democratic	2007	Re-elected	John Mizuno (D); Carole Kauhiwai Kaapo (R)
District 29	Karl Rhoads; Redistricted from District 28	Democratic	2007	Re-elected	Karl Rhoads (D)
District 30	Vacant; Incumbent John Mizuno (D) redistricted to District 28			Vacant due to redistricting Democratic Hold	Romeo Munoz Cachola (D)
District 31	Aaron Johnson; Redistricted from District 28	Republican	2011	Re-elected; Republican Gain	Aaron Johnson (R); Lei Sharsh (D)
District 32	Linda Ichiyama; Redistricted from District 31	Democratic	2011	Re-elected	Linda Ichiyama (D); Garner Musashi Shimizu (R)
District 33	Mark Takai; Redistricted from District 34	Democratic	1995	Re-elected	Mark Takai (D); Sam Kong (R)
District 34	Vacant; Incumbent Mark Takai (D) redistricted to District 33			Vacant due to redistricting Democratic Hold	Gregg Takayama (D)
District 35	Roy Takumi; Redistricted from District 36	Democratic	1993	Re-elected	Roy Takumi (D)
District 36	Marilyn Lee; Redistricted from District 38	Democratic	1997	Re-elected	Marilyn Lee (D); Beth Fukumoto (R)
District 37	Ryan Yamane	Democratic	2005	Re-elected	Ryan Yamane (D); Emil Svrcina (R)
District 38	Henry Aquino; Redistricted from District 35	Democratic	2009	Re-elected	Henry Aquino (D)
District 39	Ty Cullen; Redistricted from District 41	Democratic	2011	Re-elected	Ty Cullen (D); Carl Wong (R)
District 40	Vacant; Incumbent Sharon Har (D) redistricted to District 42			Vacant due to redistricting Republican Gain	Bob McDermott (R); Chris Kalani Manabat (D)
District 41	Rida Cabanilla Arakawa; Redistricted from District 42	Democratic	2005	Re-elected	Rida Cabanilla Arakawa (D); Adam Reeder (R)
District 42	Sharon Har; Redistricted from District 40	Democratic	2007	Re-elected	Sharon Har (D); Marissa Capelouto (R)
District 43	Karen Leilani Awana; Redistricted from District 44	Democratic	2007	Re-elected	Karen Leilani Awana (D); Glenn Butler (R)
District 44	Jo Jordan; Redistricted from District 45	Democratic	2011	Re-elected	Jo Jordan (D); Creighton Pono Higa (R)
District 45	Vacant; Incumbent Jo Jordan (D) redistricted to District 44			Vacant due to redistricting Republican Gain	Lauren Kealohilani Cheape (R); Jake Bradshaw (D)
District 46	Marcus Oshiro; Redistricted from District 39	Democratic	1995	Re-elected	Marcus Oshiro (D); Christopher Murphy (R)
District 47	Gil Riviere; Redistricted from District 46	Republican	2011	Lost Renomination; Republican Hold	Richard Fale (R); D. Ululani Beirne (D)
District 48	Pono Chong; Redistricted from District 49	Democratic	2005	Lost Renomination; Democratic Hold	Jessica Wooley (D)
District 48	Jessica Wooley; Redistricted from District 47	Democratic	2009	Re-elected	Jessica Wooley (D)
District 49	Ken Ito; Redistricted from District 48	Democratic	2005	Re-elected	Ken Ito (D)
District 50	Cynthia Thielen	Republican	1991	Re-elected	Cynthia Theilen (R)
District 51	Chris Lee	Democratic	2009	Re-elected	Chris Lee (D); Henry Vincent (R)

== See also ==
- Hawaii Senate elections, 2012
- United States Senate election in Hawaii, 2012
- United States House of Representatives elections in Hawaii, 2012
