= 2012 Hawaii Senate election =

- November 6, 2012

All 25 seats in the Hawaii Senate
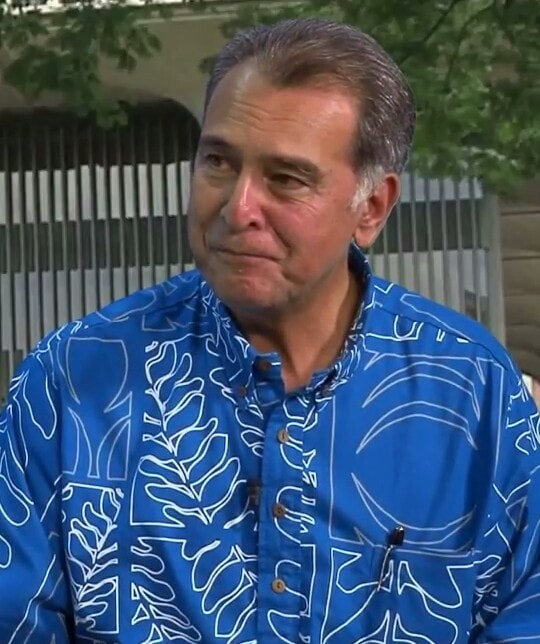

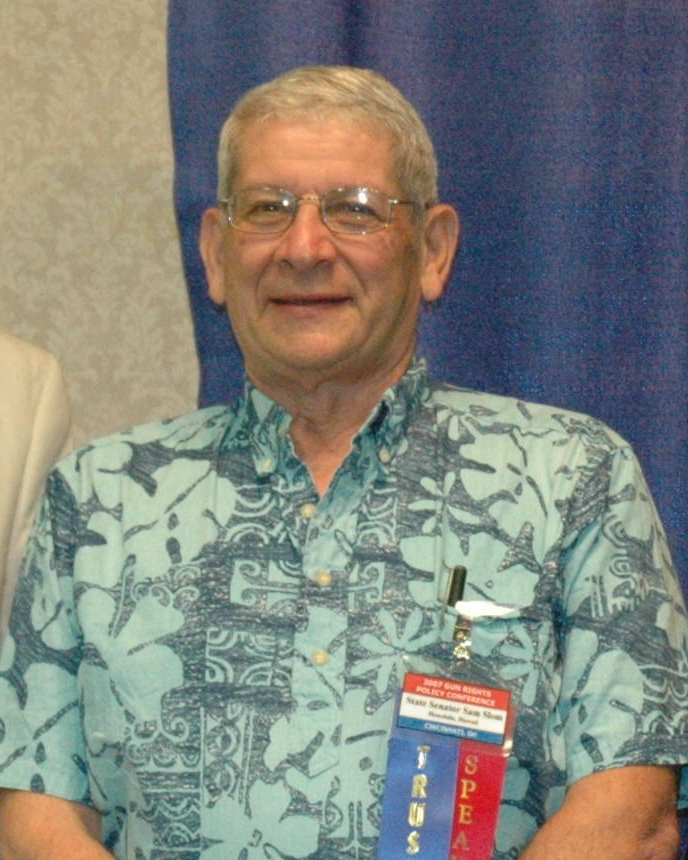
	Majority party	Minority party
Leader	Brickwood Galuteria	Sam Slom
Party	Democratic	Republican
Leader's seat	District 12	District 9
Seats before	24	1
Seats after	24	1
Seat change	Steady	Steady
Popular vote	165,035	72,264
Percentage	68.13%	29.83%
- Results: Democratic hold Republican hold
Senate President before election
Shan Tsutsui
Democratic
President-elect
Donna Mercado Kim
Democratic

The 2012 Hawaii Senate Elections were held on November 6, 2012. State senators in all 25 districts of the Hawaii Senate were up for election. 9 seats were won in the primary uncontested. No seats changed parties in this election.

== Overview ==
No seats were lost as a result of the decennial reappropriation of districts. Only 2 incumbent senators were not reelected. District 11 Senator Carol Fukunaga was defeated by fellow Democratic Senator Brian Taniguchi (formerly District 10) in the primary. Pohai Ryan, incumbent District 25 senator, was defeated by Laura Thielen in the primary.

Hawaii Senate elections, 2012 General election — November 6, 2012
Party	Votes	Percentage	Contested	Before	After	+/–
Democratic	165,035	68.13%	16	24	24	Steady
Republican	72,264	29.83%	1	1	1	Steady
Green	4,929	2.03%	0	0	0	Steady
Totals		100.00%	17	25	25	

== Predictions ==
Source	Ranking	As of
Governing	Safe D	October 24, 2012

== Results ==
=== District 1 ===
Hawaii's 1st State Senate District Election, 2012
Primary election
Party	Candidate	Votes	%
Democratic	Gilbert Kahele (incumbent)	7,027	55.7
Democratic	Donald Ikeda	5,011	39.8
Total votes		12,038	95.5
General election
Democratic	Gilbert Kahele (incumbent) (won unopposed)		0

=== District 2 ===
Hawaii's 2nd State Senate District Election, 2012
Primary election
Party	Candidate	Votes	%
Democratic	Russell Ruderman	3,106	35.4
Democratic	Bob Herkes	2,402	27.4
Democratic	Wendell Kaehuaea	1,227	14
Democratic	Gary Safarik	1,192	13.6
Republican	Daryl Lee Smith	843	9.6
Total votes		8,770	100.0
General election
Democratic	Russell Ruderman	10,487	76.9
Republican	Daryl Lee Smith	3,152	23.1
Total votes		13,639	100.0

=== District 3 ===
Hawaii's 3rd State Senate District Election, 2012
Primary election
Party	Candidate	Votes	%
Democratic	Josh Green (Incumbent)	5,941	79.3
Republican	Jeff LaFrance	825	11
Republican	John Totten	690	9.2
No party preference	Michael Last	34	0.05
Total votes		7,490	100.0
General election
Democratic	Josh Green (Incumbent)	11,347	78
Republican	Jeff LaFrance	3,192	22
Total votes		14,539	100.0

=== District 4 ===
Hawaii's 4th State Senate District Election, 2012
Primary election
Party	Candidate	Votes	%
Democratic	Malama Solomon (incumbent)	4,068	50.3
Democratic	Lorraine Rodero Inouye	3,999	49.4
Green	Kelly Greenwell	21	0.3
Total votes		8,088	100.0
General election
Democratic	Malama Solomon (incumbent)	9,825	66.6
Green	Kelly Greenwell	4,929	33.4
Total votes		14,754	100.0

=== District 5 ===
Hawaii's 5th State Senate District Election, 2012
Primary election
Party	Candidate	Votes	%
Democratic	Shan Tsutsui (incumbent)	7,337	100.0
Total votes		7,337	100.0
General election
Democratic	Shan Tsutsui (incumbent) (won unopposed)		0

=== District 6 ===
Hawaii's 6th State Senate District Election, 2012
Primary election
Party	Candidate	Votes	%
Democratic	Roz Baker (incumbent)	3,457	78.7
Republican	Bart Mulvihill	938	21.3
Total votes		4,395	100.0
General election
Democratic	Baker Roz (incumbent)	9,807	72.5
Republican	Bart Mulvihill	3,717	27.5
Total votes		13,524	100.0

=== District 7 ===
Hawaii's 7th State Senate District Election, 2012
Primary election
Party	Candidate	Votes	%
Democratic	J. Kalani English (incumbent)	5,456	70.3
Democratic	Barbara Haliniak	1,994	25.7
no party preference	Kanohowailuku Helm	316	4
Total votes		7,766	100.0
General election
Democratic	J. Kalani English (incumbent) (won unopposed)		0

=== District 8 ===
Hawaii's 8th State Senate District Election, 2012
Primary election
Party	Candidate	Votes	%
Democratic	Ronald Kouchi (incumbent)	9,539	89
Republican	William Goergi	1,173	11
Total votes		10,712	100.0
General election
Democratic	Ronald Kouchi (incumbent)	17,886	77.7
Republican	William Georgi	5,138	22.3
Total votes		23,024	100.0

=== District 9 ===
Hawaii's 9th State Senate District Election, 2012
Primary election
Party	Candidate	Votes	%
Democratic	Kurt Lajala	6,725	63.4
Republican	Sam Slom (incumbent)	3,888	36.6
Total votes		10,613	100.0
General election
Republican	Sam Slom (incumbent)	14,934	60.2
Democratic	Kurt Lajala	9,882	39.8
Total votes		24,816	100.0

=== District 10 ===
Hawaii's 10th State Senate District Election, 2012
Primary election
Party	Candidate	Votes	%
Democratic	Les Ihara, Jr. (incumbent)	8,595	89.6
Republican	Eric Marshall	1,002	10.4
Total votes		9,597	100.0
General election
Democratic	Les Ihara, Jr.	13,700	77.7
Republican	Eric Marshall	3,934	22.3
Total votes		17,634	100.0

=== District 11 ===
Hawaii's 11th State Senate District Election, 2012
Primary election
Party	Candidate	Votes	%
Democratic	Brian Taniguchi (incumbent)	6,527	49.7
Democratic	Carol Fukunaga (incumbent)	5,254	40.0
Republican	Larry Fenton	1,351	10.3
Total votes		13,132	100.0
General election
Democratic	Brian Taniguchi (incumbent)	15,634	80.4
Republican	Larry Fenton	3,804	19.6
Total votes		19,438	100.0

=== District 12 ===
Hawaii's 12th State Senate District Election, 2012
Primary election
Party	Candidate	Votes	%
Democratic	Brickwood Galuteria (incumbent)	5,052	76.6
Republican	Liz Larson	1,539	23.4
Total votes		6,591	100.0
General election
Democratic	Brickwood Galuteria (incumbent)	9,130	64.8
Republican	Liz Larson	4,958	35.2
Total votes		14,088	100.0

=== District 13 ===
Hawaii's 13th State Senate District Election, 2012
Primary election
Party	Candidate	Votes	%
Democratic	Suzanne Chun Oakland (incumbent)	7,416	100
Total votes		7,416	100.0
General election
Democratic	Suzanne Chun Oakland (incumbent) (won unopposed)		0

=== District 14 ===
Hawaii's 14th State Senate District Election, 2012
Primary election
Party	Candidate	Votes	%
Democratic	Donna Mercado Kim (incumbent)	7,194	100
Total votes		7,194	100.0
General election
Democratic	Donna Mercado Kim (incumbent) (won unopposed)		0

=== District 15 ===
Hawaii's 15th State Senate District Election, 2012
Primary election
Party	Candidate	Votes	%
Democratic	Glenn Wakai (incumbent)	5,478	100
Total votes		5,478	100.0
General election
Democratic	Glenn Wakai (incumbent) (won unopposed)		0

=== District 16 ===
Hawaii's 16th State Senate District Election, 2012
Primary election
Party	Candidate	Votes	%
Democratic	David Ige (incumbent)	9,629	87.6
Republican	Mike Greco	1,363	12.4
Total votes		10,992	100.0
General election
Democratic	David Ige (incumbent)	14,156	79.3
Republican	Mike Greco	3,705	20.7
Total votes		17,861	100.0

=== District 17 ===
Hawaii's 17th State Senate District Election, 2012
Primary election
Party	Candidate	Votes	%
Democratic	Clarence Nishihara (incumbent)	5,295	61.1
Democratic	Alex Sonson	3,365	38.9
Total votes		8,660	100.0
General election
Democratic	Clarence Nishihara (incumbent) (won unopposed)		0

=== District 18 ===
Hawaii's 18th State Senate District Election, 2012
Primary election
Party	Candidate	Votes	%
Democratic	Michelle Kidani (incumbent)	7,434	55.5
Democratic	Michael Magaoay	4,077	30.4
Republican	Rojo Herrerra	1,888	14.1
Total votes		13,399	100.0
General election
Democratic	Michelle Kidani (incumbent)	14,156	71.8
Republican	Mike Greco	5,572	28.2
Total votes		19,728	100.0

=== District 19 ===
Hawaii's 19th State Senate District Election, 2012
Primary election
Party	Candidate	Votes	%
Democratic	Will Espero (incumbent)	4,449	81.4
Democratic	Roger Lacuesta	1,018	18.6
Total votes		5,467	100.0
General election
Democratic	Will Espero (incumbent) (won unopposed)		0

=== District 20 ===
Hawaii's 20th State Senate District Election, 2012
Primary election
Party	Candidate	Votes	%
Democratic	Mike Gabbard (incumbent)	4,750	78
Republican	Dean Kalani Capelouto	1,339	22
Total votes		6,089	100.0
General election
Democratic	Mike Gabbard (incumbent)	9,382	71.9
Republican	Dean Kalani Capelouto	3,665	28.1
Total votes		13,047	100.0

=== District 21 ===
Hawaii's 21st State Senate District Election, 2012
Primary election
Party	Candidate	Votes	%
Democratic	Maile Shimabukuro (incumbent)	4,370	84.8
Republican	Dickyj Johnson	784	15.2
Total votes		5,154	100.0
General election
Democratic	Maile Shimabukuro (incumbent)	7,932	76.7
Republican	Dickyj Johnson	2,405	23.3
Total votes		10,337	100.0

=== District 22 ===
Hawaii's 22nd State Senate District Election, 2012
Primary election
Party	Candidate	Votes	%
Democratic	Donovan Dela Cruz (incumbent)	6,055	79.4
Republican	Charles Aki	1,572	20.6
Total votes		7,627	100.0
General election
Democratic	Donovan Dela Cruz (incumbent)	10,393	73.5
Republican	Charles Aki	3,740	26.5
Total votes		14,133	100.0

=== District 23 ===
Hawaii's 23rd State Senate District Election, 2012
Primary election
Party	Candidate	Votes	%
Democratic	Clayton Hee (incumbent)	4,252	73.2
Republican	Colleen Meyer	1,555	26.8
Total votes		5,807	100.0
General election
Democratic	Clayton Hee (incumbent)	6,964	53.4
Republican	Colleen Meyer	6,069	46.6
Total votes		13,033	100.0

=== District 24 ===
Hawaii's 24th State Senate District Election, 2012
Primary election
Party	Candidate	Votes	%
Democratic	Jill Tokuda (incumbent)	10,970	100.0
Total votes		10,970	100.0
General election
Democratic	Jill Tokuda (incumbent) (won unopposed)		0

=== District 25 ===
Hawaii's 25th State Senate District Election, 2012
Primary election
Party	Candidate	Votes	%
Democratic	Laura Thielen	6,236	41.4
Democratic	Pohai Ryan (incumbent)	4,769	31.6
Democratic	Levani Lipton	1,474	9.8
Republican	Fred Hemmings	2,595	17.2
Total votes		15,074	100.0
General election
Democratic	Laura Thielen	13,700	59.5
Republican	Fred Hemmings	9,331	40.5
Total votes		23,031	100.0

== See also ==
- Hawaii State House of Representatives Elections, 2012
- United States Senate election in Hawaii, 2012
- United States House of Representatives elections in Hawaii, 2012
