= Elijah Pierick =

American politician (born 1994)

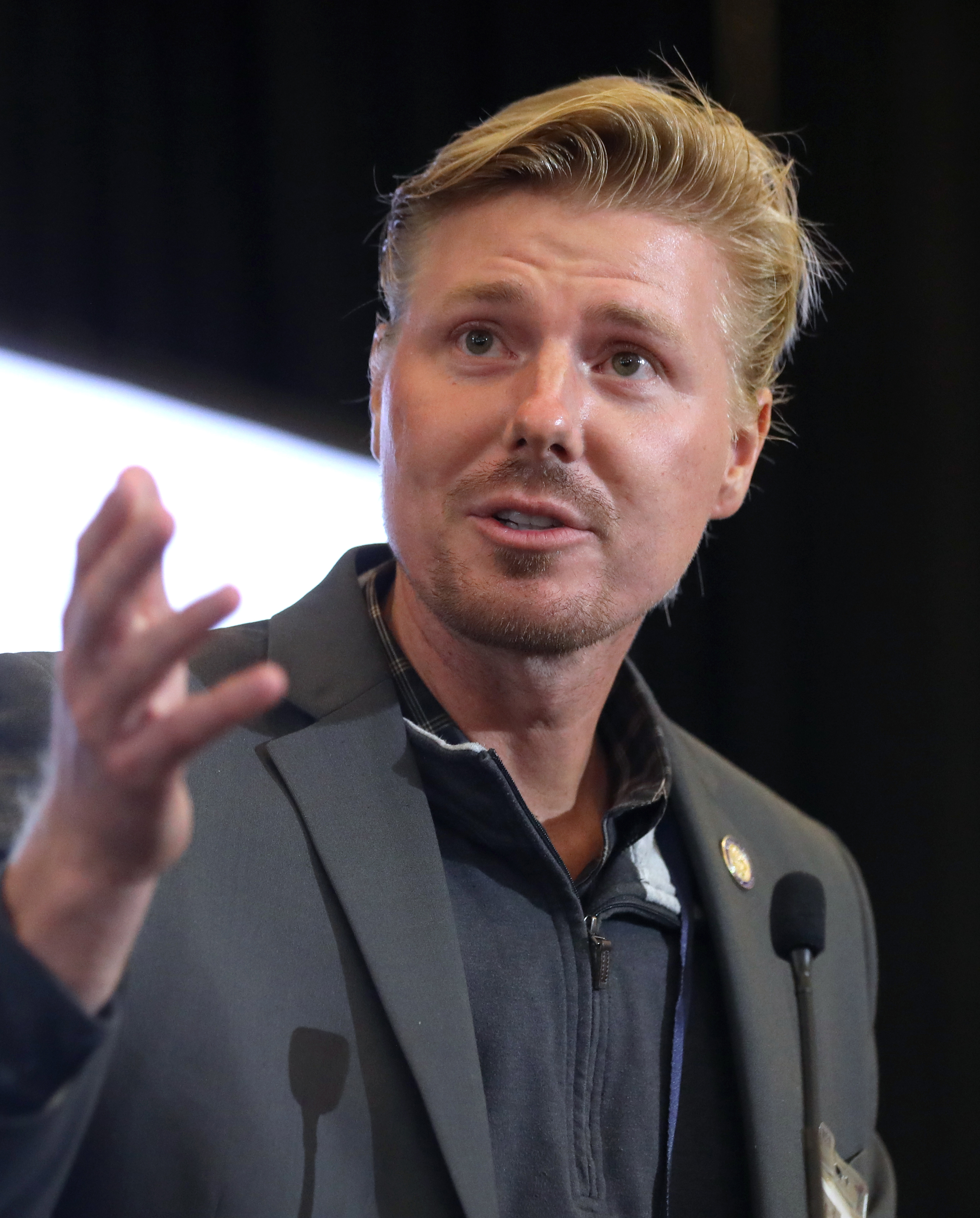
- Pierick speaking in 2023

Member of the Hawaii House of Representatives from the 39th district
- In office November 8, 2022 – November 3, 2026
- Preceded by: Luella Costales
- Succeeded by: Corey Rosenlee

Personal details
- Born: Elijah Isiah Pierick; November 28, 1994 (age 31) Florida, U.S.
- Party: Republican
- Education: Pacific Rim Christian University; Liberty University (DMin)
- Website: Campaign website

Military service
- Branch/service: United States Air Force Reserve

Elijah Isiah Pierick (born November 28, 1994) is an American politician who was a member of the Hawaii House of Representatives for the 39th district encompassing Royal Kunia, Village Park, Honouliuli, and Hoopili from 2022 to 2026. A member of the Republican Party, he won the seat in the 2022 election against Democratic nominee Corey Rosenlee, flipping the seat. He was appointed as House Minority Whip in January 2026.

In 2026, Pierick left his seat to run for the Hawaii Senate against Democratic incumbent Rachele Lamosao. He was defeated by Lamosao in the general election.

== Early life and career ==
Pierick was born in Florida and raised in Ewa, Hawaii. He was homeschooled and earned bachelor’s and master’s degrees from Pacific Rim Christian University. In 2022, Pierick earned an online Doctor of Ministry with a focus in pastoral counseling from Liberty University.

In 2019, Pierick joined the United States Air Force Reserve as a chaplain candidate. He considered running for city councilmember or mayor before deciding to run for the Hawaii House of Representatives in 2022 after, according to himself, having "an encounter with God during a worship service at his local church."

== Political career ==
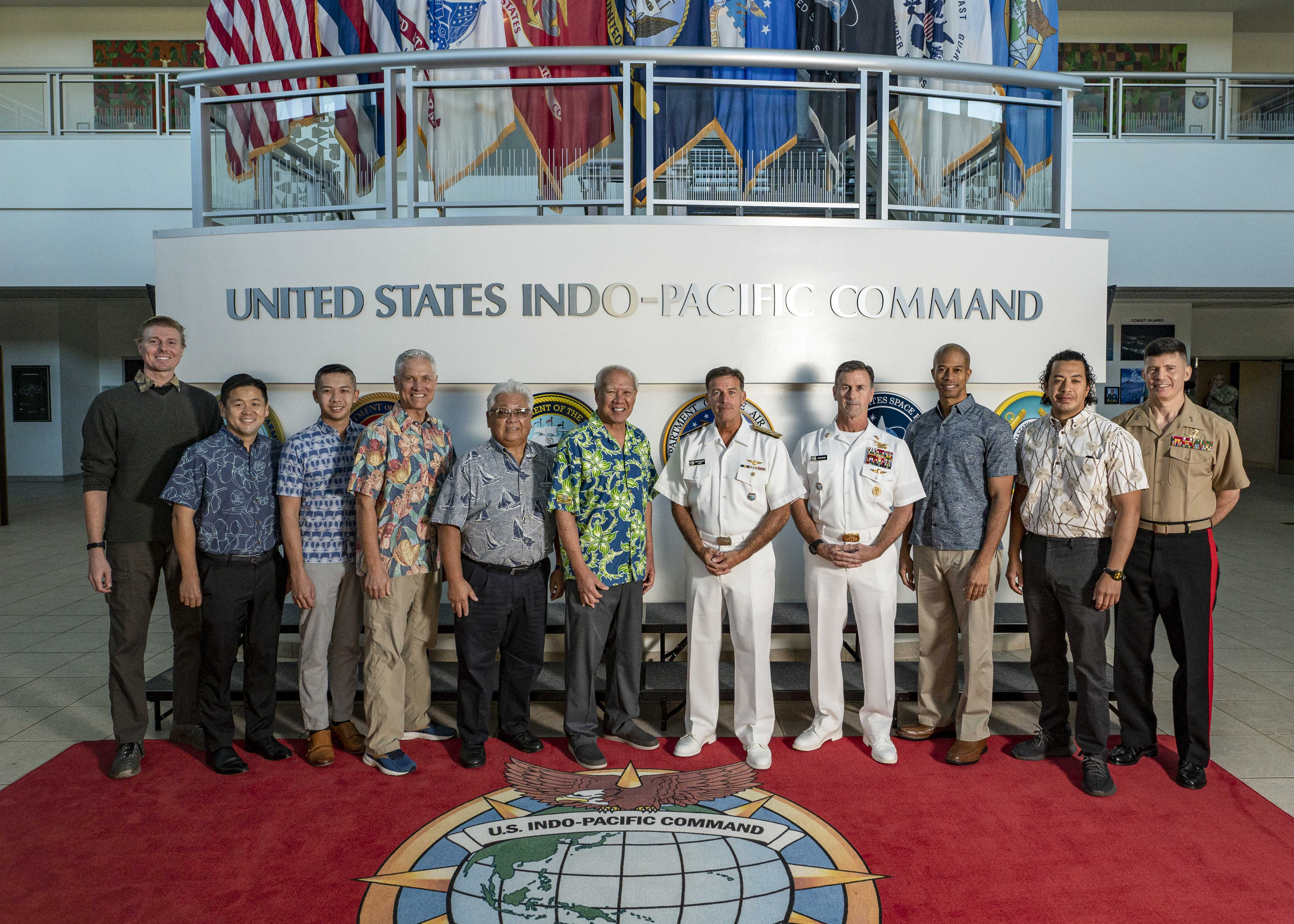
Pierick (furthest left) and other state legislators tour the United States Indo-Pacific Command in January 2023.

=== Hawaii House of Representatives (2022–2026) ===
==== Campaigns ====
Pierick won the 39th district seat in the 2022 election with 52.4% of the vote against Democratic opponent Corey Rosenlee. He flipped the open seat to Republicans after incumbent Democrat Ty Cullen resigned after being convicted of accepting bribes and appointed Democrat Luella Costales did not run for re-election.

He defeated Rosenlee in a rematch in the 2024 election, with an automatic recount finding that Pierick had won by 20 votes. Rosenlee sued Honolulu City Clerk Glenn Takahashi, alleging that errors in reviewing voter signatures affected the election. In January 2025, the Hawaii Supreme Court affirmed Pierick's 11-vote victory.

==== Tenure ====
After taking office in November 2022, Pierick was appointed assistant minority floor leader. In January 2026, Pierick was appointed minority whip and serves as a member of the Consumer Protection and Commerce, Housing, and Transportation committees.

In March 2023, Pierick posted on social media questioning why ʻEwa Makai Middle School displayed a pride flag in its building after visiting the school. The video drew rebuke from fellow Republican and Hawaii Senate minority leader Kurt Fevella, who called on Pierick to apologize and to be voted out, further saying "Don't you ever disrespect my community, especially my young community. I take offense to that," on social media. Kūhiō Lewis, CEO of the Council for Native Hawaiian Advancement and chair of the Prince Kūhiō Parade honoring Jonah Kūhiō Kalanianaʻole, notified Pierick that he was disinvited from the parade due to the comments.

Also in March 2023, Pierick and Diamond Garcia were the sole votes against establishing an institute dedicated to restoration and healing at the University of Hawaii’s William S. Richardson School of Law; during the floor debate, Pierick said “My understanding is that this bill would promote critical race theory, which is basically racism against white people,” which drew visibly confused reactions from other state representatives and was rebutted by fellow Republican representative Kanani Souza.

Pierick expressed support for Donald Trump's cuts to US foreign aid spending and federal spending in March 2025, stating "I think our U.S. citizens in our state are much more important to be focused on than people in every other country," continuing "Hawaii needs to grow up and not have a baby mentality of ‘We need more resources.’ We need to be more self sufficient." He voted against the 2025 state budget in May 2025 for encouraging big government spending instead of private sector growth.

A Honolulu Civil Beat analysis of the publication's Digital Democracy database tracking legislators' attendance found that Pierick was the second most absent legislator in the 2025 session, missing a total of 617 votes, which he acknowledged as being due to a business trip attending the national cabinet meeting of the International Church of the Foursquare Gospel in California and on traffic from his home.

In January 2025, the Hawaii House of Representatives passed a new social media policy requiring that members' accounts "not be used to disparage other members, other individuals, or political parties. This includes featuring other members, individuals, or political parties in a way that invites disparaging or threatening comments or reactions, even if the content is presented in a neutral manner." The new rule was created in response to a March 2024 Instagram post in which Pierick posted a video captioned "What are your thoughts?" of Democratic representative Jeanné Kapela saying "I want a lesbian for president. I want a person with AIDS for president, and I want a gay man for vice president." Kapela accused him of inciting hate as commenters criticized her.

In March 2026, he was fined $275 by the Hawaii Campaign Spending Commission for failure to report expenditures and for violating the political advertisement disclaimer state law, having previously been fined $1,000 by the commission in 2025 for failing to report several contributions and expenditures.

=== 2026 Hawaii Senate campaign ===
In the 2026 election, Pierick ran for the 19th district of the Hawaii Senate against appointed Democratic incumbent Rachele Lamosao. He was defeated by Lamosao in the general election.

== Electoral history ==
=== 2022 ===
Hawaii's 39th House District Republican primary election, 2022
Party	Candidate	Votes	%
Republican	Elijah Pierick	853	60.07%
Republican	Austin Maglinti	567	39.93%
Total votes		1,420	100%

Hawaii's 39th House District general election, 2022
Party	Candidate	Votes	%
Republican	Elijah Pierick	3,793	55.11%
Democratic	Corey Rosenlee	3,089	44.89%
Total votes		6,882	100%
Republican gain from Democratic			

=== 2024 ===
Hawaii House of Representatives District 39 general election, 2024
Party	Candidate	Votes	%
Republican	Elijah Pierick (incumbent)	4,712	47.1%
Democratic	Corey Rosenlee	4,701	46.9%
	Blank votes	587	5.9%
	Over votes	13	0.1%
Total votes		9,426	100%
Republican hold			
