= Daisy Hartsfield =

American politician

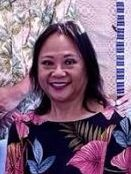
- Hartsfield in 2025

Member of the Hawaii House of Representatives from the 36th district
- Incumbent
- Assumed office January 12, 2026
- Appointed by: Josh Green
- Preceded by: Rachele Lamosao

Personal details
- Born: 1967 or 1968 (age 58–59)
- Party: Democratic
- Education: University of Hawaiʻi at Mānoa (BA, MSW); William S. Richardson School of Law (JD)

Daisy Lynn Balais Hartsfield is an American social worker, attorney, and politician serving as a member of the Hawaii House of Representatives for the 36th district since 2026. A member of the Democratic Party, Hartsfield was appointed to the role by Governor Josh Green to succeed then-Representative Rachele Lamosao, who was appointed to the Hawaii State Senate earlier that year.

== Early life and career ==
Hartsfield graduated from Waipahu High School before earning a Bachelor of Arts in Psychology and a Master of Social Work from the University of Hawaiʻi at Mānoa and a Juris Doctor degree from the university's William S. Richardson School of Law.

Hartsfield has previously worked as a Child Protective Services investigator, juvenile probation officer, drug court supervisor, special assistant to the Director of Human Services, administrator of the Hawaii Department of Human Services’ Social Services Division, deputy public defender, deputy attorney general and as a private attorney. She is a board member of the Hawaii Filipino Lawyers Association.

== Hawaii House of Representatives ==
Hartsfield was appointed to the Hawaii House of Representatives on January 12, 2026 and took office on January 21, 2026. She was appointed by Governor Josh Green to succeed then-Representative Rachele Lamosao, who was appointed to the Hawaii State Senate after Henry Aquino resigned his seat late in the previous year. Hartsfield had also applied for the Senate appointment.
