= 2012 Hawaii elections =

- November 6, 2012

Hawaii's 2012 general elections were held on November 6, 2012. Primary elections were held on August 11, 2012.

== Federal ==
=== Senate ===
Incumbent Democratic U.S. Senator Daniel Akaka, who held the position since 1990, retired.

U.S. Representative Mazie Hirono sought and received the Democratic nomination to succeed Akaka. She defeated former U.S. Representative Ed Case, Michael Gillespie, Antonio Gimbernat, and Arturo Pacheco Reyes in the Democratic primary.

Former Governor Linda Lingle sought and received the Republican nomination. She defeated former state Senator John Carroll, Charles Collins, Eddie Pirkowski, and John Roco in the Republican primary.

=== House of Representatives ===
==== 1st congressional district ====
Democratic incumbent Colleen Hanabusa, who had represented the 1st district since January 2011, ran for re-election. She defeated Roy Wyttenbach II in the Democratic primary.

Former U.S. Representative Charles Djou, who had represented the 1st district from May 2010 to January 2011, sought and received the Republican nomination to challenge Hanabusa. He defeated C. Kaui Amsterdam and John Giuffre in the Republican primary.

==== 2nd congressional district ====
Democratic incumbent Mazie Hirono, who had represented the 2nd district since 2007, ran for the U.S. Senate.

Tulsi Gabbard, then a member of the Honolulu City Council, sought and received the Democratic nomination to succeed Hirono. She defeated Rafael Del Castillo, an attorney; Mufi Hannemann, the former Mayor of Honolulu; Esther Kia'aina, the chief advocate of the Office of Hawaiian Affairs; Bob Marx, an attorney; and, Miles Shiratori, a financial advisor, in the Democratic primary.

Kawika Crowley, a handyman, sought and received the Republican nomination. He defeated Matt DiGeronimo, a businessman and former Navy officer, in the Republican primary.

== State Legislature ==
=== Senate ===
Because of redistricting, all 25 members of the Hawaii Senate were up for election. Prior to the election, the state Senate consisted of 24 Democrats and 1 Republican. Open seats
District 2: This was a new seat, with no former incumbent.

District 25: Democratic incumbent Pohai Ryan was defeated in the primary.

=== House of Representatives ===
All 51 members of the Hawaii House of Representatives were up for election. Prior to the election, the state House consisted of 43 Democrats and 8 Republicans. Open seats
District 6: This was a new seat, with no former incumbent.

District 19: Republican incumbent Barbara Marumoto retired.

District 30 (old District 29): Democratic incumbent Joey Manahan was running for a seat on the Honolulu City Council.

District 34: This was a new seat, with no former incumbent.

District 40 (old District 43): Republican incumbent Kymberly Pine was running for a seat on the Honolulu City Council.

District 45: This was a new seat, with no former incumbent.

District 47 (old District 46): Republican incumbent Gil Riviere was defeated in the primary.
