= Greggor Ilagan =

American politician

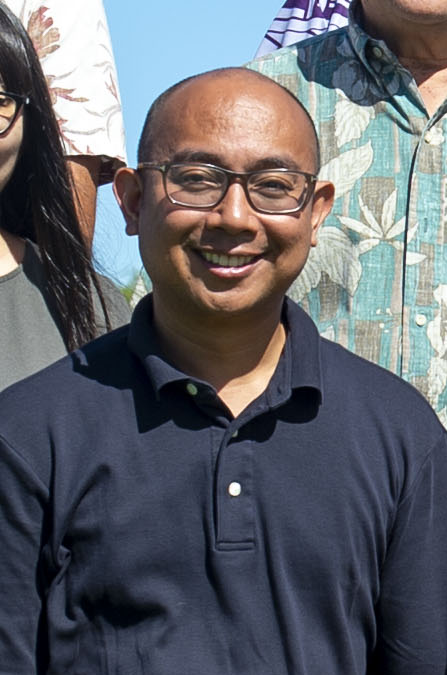
- Ilagan in 2023

Vice Speaker of the Hawaii House of Representatives
- In office November 8, 2022 – November 6, 2024
- Preceded by: John Mizuno
- Succeeded by: Linda Ichiyama

Member of the Hawaii House of Representatives from the 4th district
- Incumbent
- Assumed office November 3, 2020
- Preceded by: Joy San Buenaventura

Personal details
- Born: 1986 or 1987 (age 39–40) Misamis Occidental, Philippines
- Party: Democratic
- Website: repilagan.com

Greggor Johanson P. Ilagan is an American politician who is currently the Hawaii state representative in Hawaii's 4th district. He won the seat after incumbent Democrat Joy San Buenaventura decided to run for a seat in the Hawaii Senate. He previously ran for Hawaii Senate in Hawaii's 2nd district, running in the primary against then-incumbent Russell Ruderman, losing the race. He won election for his House seat in 2020 against Republican Hope Louise Cermelj. Ilagan also served as a member of the Hawai'i County Council from 2012 to 2016.

== Early life and education ==
Ilagan was born in Misamis Occidental in the Philippines. His biological father was an engineer from Nueva Ecija. Before Ilagan turned seven years old, his mother remarried and they left the Philippines to live with his stepfather in Hawaii. Upon graduating from Waiakea High School in Hilo, Ilagan served in the Hawaii Air National Guard for six years.

== Political career ==
Ilagan was elected to the Hawaii County Council in 2012 and reelected in 2014. In 2016, he ran against then-incumbent Hawaii state senator Russell Ruderman in the Democratic primary for Hawaii's 2nd district. During his campaign, his use of the dating app Tinder made national news on NPR, Time, and Huffington Post. He lost the race by nine percent.

In 2020, Ilagan ran in Hawaii's 4th State House district, winning both the Democratic primary and general election. In the State House, Ilagan served on the housing and finance committees and vice chair for the transportation committee. In 2022, Ilagan was appointed vice speaker.

== Electoral history ==
Hawaii 2nd State Senate District Democratic Primary, 2016
| Party | Candidate | Votes | % |
|---|---|---|---|
| Democratic | Russell E. Ruderman (incumbent) | 4,275 | 54.42 |
| Democratic | Greggor Ilagan | 3,580 | 45.58 |
| Total votes | | 7,855 | 100.0 |

Hawaii 4th State House District Democratic Primary, 2020
| Party | Candidate | Votes | % |
|---|---|---|---|
| Democratic | Greggor Ilagan | 3,683 | 61.72 |
| Democratic | Eileen Ohara | 2,284 | 38.28 |
| Total votes | | 5,967 | 100.0 |

Hawaii 4th State House District General Election, 2020
| Party | Candidate | Votes | % |
|---|---|---|---|
| Democratic | Greggor Ilagan | 7,801 | 70.10 |
| Republican | Hope "Alohalani" Cermelj | 1,943 | 17.46 |
| Aloha ʻĀina | Desmon Antone Haumea | 1,384 | 12.44 |
| Total votes | | 11,128 | 100.0 |

Hawaii 4th State House District Democratic Primary, 2022
| Party | Candidate | Votes | % |
|---|---|---|---|
| Democratic | Greggor Ilagan (incumbent) | 3,325 | 100.0 |
| Total votes | | 3,325 | 100.0 |

Hawaii 4th State House District General Election, 2022
| Party | Candidate | Votes | % |
|---|---|---|---|
| Democratic | Greggor Ilagan (incumbent) | 4,855 | 69.60 |
| Republican | Keikilani Ho | 1,611 | 23.10 |
| Nonpartisan | Brian C. Ley | 354 | 5.08 |
| Libertarian | Candace T. "Candy" Linton | 155 | 2.22 |
| Total votes | | 6,975 | 100.0 |

Hawaii House of Representatives
| Preceded by John Mizuno | Vice Speaker of the Hawaii House of Representatives; 2022–2024 | Succeeded by Linda Ichiyama |
