= Colleen Meyer =

American politician (1939–2015)

Colleen Rose Meyer

Member of the Hawaii House of Representatives from the 47th district
- In office November 5, 2002 – November 4, 2008
- Preceded by: Charles Djou
- Succeeded by: Jessica Wooley

Member of the Hawaii House of Representatives from the 46th district
- In office November 8, 1994 – November 5, 2002
- Preceded by: Ululani Beirne
- Succeeded by: Michael Magaoay

Personal details
- Born: March 8, 1939 Honolulu, Territory of Hawaii, U.S.
- Died: July 17, 2015 (aged 76) Kāneʻohe, Hawaii, U.S.
- Party: Republican
- Spouse: George Meyer (m. 1960)
- Education: College of San Mateo (AA)
- Occupation: Realtor, politician

Colleen Rose Meyer (March 8, 1939 – July 17, 2015) was an American realtor and politician. A member of the Republican Party, she served in the Hawaii House of Representatives from 1994 to 2008. After losing reelection to Jessica Wooley in 2008, she ran unsuccessfully for the Hawaii Senate in 2012 and 2014.

== Life and career ==
Meyer was born on March 8, 1939, in Honolulu. She attended Punahou School and San Mateo College, graduating with an associate degree in 1959. In 1960 she married to George Meyer; they remained married until her death. Meyer worked in the real estate industry, both as a realtor and as a property manager. She died from cancer on July 17, 2015, in Kaneohe.

=== Hawaii House of Representatives (1995–2008) ===
Meyer served in the Hawaii House of Representatives from 1994 onwards. A Republican, she held a number of committee positions and served as assistant minority floor leader. During the 2003–2004 session, Meyer received the lowest score among all Hawaii lawmakers from the Sierra Club's Environmental Scorecard. In 2008, Meyer opposed the legislation that required new homes to contain solar water heaters.

== Elections ==
Meyer first ran for election to the House for the 46th District in 1992, losing to Democrat Ululani Beirne in the general election. Beirne did not run for reelection in 1994 and Meyer again ran, winning against Reb Bellinger with 50.5% of the vote. Meyer ran for reelection in 1996 and 1998, winning with 59.4% and 68.8% of the vote respectively. In the 2000 election, Meyer ran on a platform focused on her experience in the legislature and argued for greater communication between lawmakers and their constituents. She won the general election with 66.8% of the vote. In the 2002 election, Meyer ran in the 47th District as a result of redistricting. She emphasized a need to lower taxes on both businesses and citizens in Hawaii and won with 60.2% of the vote. She won again in 2004 and 2006.

In the 2008 election, Meyer faced Democrat Jessica Wooley in the general election. During the campaign, which Meyer described as a "full court press," she advocated for the repeal of Hawaii's smoking ban and endorsed a new constitutional convention. Meyer lost the election, earning only 45.8% of the vote. In 2012, Meyer ran for the Hawaii Senate in District 23, with the Honolulu Star-Advertiser arguing that she could benefit from stronger religious and business-owner turnout as a result of that year's presidential election. She lost to Clayton Hee in the general election. Meyer ran again in 2014 but lost in the primary election to Richard Fale.
