= Luella Costales =

American politician

Member of the Hawaii House of Representatives from the 39th district
- In office March 11, 2022 – November 8, 2022
- Appointed by: David Ige
- Preceded by: Ty Cullen
- Succeeded by: Elijah Pierick

Personal details
- Born: Los Angeles, California
- Party: Democratic
- Education: University of California San Diego (BA)

Luella Toledo Costales is an American politician who served as a Democratic member of the Hawaiʻi House of Representatives. She was appointed to represent the 39th district after incumbent Representative Ty Cullen resigned in February 2022.

== Early life and education ==
Costales was born in Los Angeles and moved to Hawaiʻi in 1992 after her children were born. She graduated from the University of California San Diego with a Bachelor of Arts in Communication/Visual Arts and minors in Literature/Writing and Sociology.

== Career ==
Costales previously served as executive director of the Hawaiʻi Farm Bureau Federation and the Filipino Community Center in Waipahu. She was previously the director of fund development for the Rehabilitation Hospital of the Pacific and currently works as the community and resource manager for the Oahu Economic Development Board.

Costales was appointed to the Honolulu Police Commission in 2012 by Mayor Peter Carlisle. She resigned in 2017 in protest over a lack of gender, ethnic, and work background diversity on a consultant-selected panel reviewing candidates for a new police chief to replace Louis Kealoha.

== Hawaiʻi House of Representatives ==
Governor David Ige appointed Costales to fill the 39th district seat left vacant after incumbent Representative Ty Cullen resigned due to pleading guilty to federal bribery charges. She was sworn in on March 11, 2022. Costales did not run for a full term in the 2022 Hawaiʻi House of Representatives election, and she was succeeded by Republican Elijah Pierick.

Costales had previously run for the 36th district in 2014, losing the Democratic primary to former representative Marilyn Lee who went on to lose to incumbent Republican Beth Fukumoto.

== Electoral history ==
2014 Hawaiʻi House of Representatives 36th district Democratic primary results
| Party | Candidate | Votes | % |
|---|---|---|---|
| Democratic | Marilyn Lee | 3,762 | 64.7 |
| Democratic | Luella Costales | 1,598 | 27.5 |
| Independent | Over and Under votes | 454 | 7.8 |
| Total votes | | 5,814 | 100 |
