= Sol Kahoʻohalahala =

American politician

Member of the Hawaii House of Representatives from the 13th district
- In office 2002 – February 4, 2005
- Succeeded by: Mele Carroll

Member of the Hawaii House of Representatives from the 7th district
- In office 1999–2000
- Preceded by: Mike White
- Succeeded by: Ron Davis

Personal details
- Born: March 30, 1951 (age 75) Lānaʻi City, Hawaii
- Party: Democratic

Solomon P. Kahoʻohalahala (born March 30, 1951) is an American politician from the state of Hawaii. He served in the Hawaii House of Representatives from 1999 to 2000 and from 2003 to 2005. In 2005 he resigned his seat to become Director of the Kahoʻolawe Island Reserve Commission, serving until 2008. He previously served on the Maui County Council from 1994 to 1998, representing the Lanai City district.

== Education and career ==
Kahoʻohalahala is an alumnus of Maui Community College and was a hotel general manager. He also served as cultural resources director for Castle & Cooke Resorts on Lānaʻi, and participated in the 1998 Hōkūleʻa voyage to Rapanui.

== Elections ==
- 1998 Kahoʻohalahala was unopposed for the September 19, 1998 Democratic Primary, winning the District 7 seat with 1,959 votes. He went on to win the November 3, 1998 General election with 3,979 votes (57.9%) against Republican nominee Brian K. Blundell.
- 2000 Kahoʻohalahala was unopposed for the September 23, 2000 Democratic Primary, winning 1,549 votes. However, in the November 7, 2000 General election, Kahoʻohalahala lost with 2,594 votes (43.2%) against Republican nominee Ron Davis, who won with 3,114 votes (51.8%).
- 2002 After being redistricted to District 13, Kahoʻohalahala defeated Frances (Lincoln) Segundo in the September 21, 2002 Democratic Primary with 2,041 votes (59.6%). In a rematch with incumbent Ron Davis in the November 5, 2002 General election, Kahoʻohalahala won with 3,929 votes (53.7%).
- 2004 Kahoʻohalahala ran unopposed in the September 18, 2004 Democratic Primary. In the November 2, 2004 General election, he won with 5,559 votes (66.6%) against Republican nominee Meiling Akuna.
