= Corinne Ching =

American politician (born 1961)

Member of the Hawaii House of Representatives
- In office 2002–2012
- Succeeded by: Takashi Ohno
- Constituency: District 27

Personal details
- Party: Republican

Corinne Wei Lan Ching (born August 31, 1961) is a former American politician from the Hawaii Republican Party. She represented the 27th District in the Hawaii House of Representatives from 2002 to 2012. During her time in the House, she was known for her historic preservation efforts.

== Life and career ==
Ching was born in Honolulu on August 31, 1961. She attended Punahou School, graduating in 1980, and later graduated from the University of Hawaiʻi at Mānoa. Prior to entering politics, Ching worked as an ESL teacher at Maʻemaʻe Elementary School in Honolulu.

Ching served in the Hawaii House of Representatives from 2002 to 2012. While serving in the House, Ching led an effort to revitalize the Honolulu neighborhood of Liliha. To do so, she helped develop a visitors center for the community, organized community cleanup events, and produced a calendar. She also founded the "Hawaii Heritage Caucus," a group of state legislators who promote historic preservation efforts. In the 2012 Hawaii House of Representatives election, she was unseated by Democrat Takashi Ohno.

== Elections ==
Ching first ran for office in 1996, when she made an unsuccessful bid for a seat in the Hawaii House of Representatives for the 27th district. She ran again in 1998, losing to Democratic incumbent Lei Ahu Isa by only 19 votes. In 2002 she ran for the seat a third time, winning with 53.6% of the vote. She won reelection in 2004 with 50.5% of the vote, 2006 with 56.6% of the vote, and 2008 with 51.6% of the vote. In 2010 she had her most decisive victory, winning with 65.4% of the vote, but she earned only 41% of the vote in 2012, losing to Democrat Takashi Ohno.
