= David Pendleton =

American politician

Member of the Hawaii House of Representatives from the 49th district
- In office 1996–2004
- Succeeded by: Pono Chong

Personal details
- Born: David Alexander Pendleton; February 2, 1967 (age 59) Glendale, California
- Party: Republican
- Spouse: Noemi
- Children: Four
- Education: La Sierra University; Loma Linda University; University of Southern California; Marine Corps Command and Staff College
- Occupation: Minister; Lawyer; Teacher; University administrator Administrative law judge
- Nickname: "Kawika"

David Alexander Pendleton (born February 2, 1967) is a former Minority Floor Leader of the Hawaii House of Representatives, from 1998 until 2002. As a member of the Republican Party, he served four two-year terms (1996–2004) as a state representative for Kailua and Kaneohe.

== Biography ==
=== Early life and education ===
Pendleton, whose grandmother immigrated from Ilocos Norte to Hawaii in 1930, was born in California before moving to Hawaii while in preschool. Attending Hawaiian Mission Academy, he initially pursued a pre-medicine curriculum before settling on a double major in both history and political science at La Sierra University. He graduated from La Sierra in the Honors Program and magna cum laude. Earning a Master of Arts in religion from Loma Linda University, becoming a minister before earning a Juris Doctor from USC and was admitted to the bar in California and Hawaii.

=== Early work ===
In 1985, Pendleton started his experience with public service by interning with the Hawaii Lieutenant Governor's Office. After graduating from USC he taught at San Gabriel Academy, before becoming the Associate Vice President for Student Life at La Sierra University. Beginning in 1995, Pendleton practiced law in Hawaii with two plaintiffs' firms before serving as an administrator and in-house counsel to a non-profit. He was a member of the 1998 class of the Pacific Century Fellows.

=== Political office ===
Starting in 1996, Pendleton served as the Representative of the 49th District (which was originally the 50th District) in the Hawaii House of Representatives; while in the House, Pendleton was the Minority Whip, Assistant Minority Leader, and finally the Minority Floor Leader.

In 2000, along with Governor Lingle, Pendleton sued the Hawaii State Legislature to open closed-door conference committee meetings so that the public could attend. Later in 2000, Pendleton was a delegate at the Republican National Convention. In 2002, Pendleton was thought to be a potential candidate for the office of Lieutenant Governor of Hawaii, and joined the Legislative Advisory Board of the Heartland Institute. In 2004, Pendleton lost his reelection by 123 votes, after being the target of negative mailers that Noemi Pendleton called "dirty campaigning".

=== Later work ===
Pendleton later worked on Governor Lingle's staff, and was appointed to the Labor and Industrial Relations Appeals Board for a ten-year term beginning in 2006. Despite formally being a Seventh-day-Adventist minister, Pendleton converted to Catholicism in 2008.

== See also ==
- List of Asian American jurists

== External link ==
Official website
