= Waipahu High School =

Public school in Waipahu, Hawaii, US

Coordinates: 21.388295°N 157.993366°W

Location
- 94-1211 Farrington Highway; Waipahu, Hawaii 96797; United States

Information
- Type: Public, Co-educational
- Motto: "My Voice. My Choice. My Future."
- Established: 1938
- School district: Leeward District
- Principal: Zachary Sheets
- Teaching staff: 162.00 (FTE)
- Grades: 9–12
- Enrollment: 2,516 (2023–2024)
- Student to teacher ratio: 15.53
- Campus: Urban
- Colors: Navy Blue and Gold
- Athletics: Oahu Interscholastic Association
- Mascot: Marauder
- Rival: James Campbell High School
- Accreditation: Western Association of Schools and Colleges
- Newspaper: The Cane Tassel
- Yearbook: Ka Mea Ohi (The Harvester)
- Military: United States Army JROTC
- Website: http://www.waipahuhigh.org

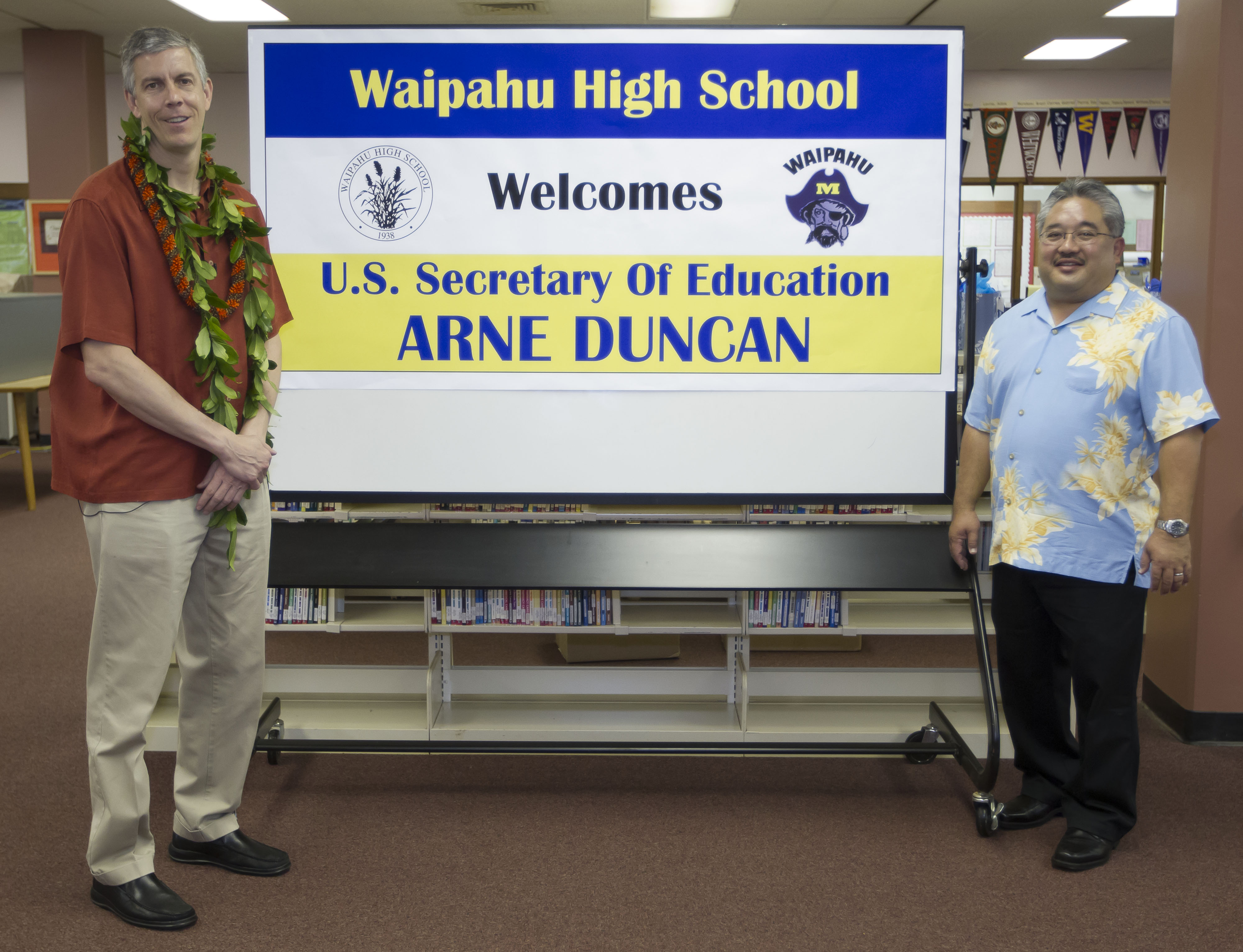
Arne Duncan (left) with principal Keith Hayashi in 2014

Waipahu High School is a co-ed secondary school operated by the Hawaii State Department of Education. Its mascot is the marauder and its rival is James Campbell High School. The school was founded in 1938.

== History ==
In 1938, Waipahu High was founded under the Session Laws of 1937 and Act 191 of 1938. Originally built on present-day Waipahu Intermediate grounds, the school was created to provide better educational opportunities to students in Aiea, Pearl City, Waipahu, Ewa, Nanakuli, and Waianae. The first graduates of Waipahu High School were from the class of 1941. The last graduating class from the "termite palace" was the class of 1969, when a new campus was opened.

In 1942, its football field was renamed after its former principal Dallas C. McClaren, who served as the school's first principal.

In 1969, a new campus was opened, moving Waipahu High to its present day site in order to accomidate the rapid growth of the school. Because of this change, Waipahu Intermediate was established on the Waipahu HIgh's former campus and housed seventh and eighth grades; Waipahu High became a four-year high school.

In 2009, Keith Hayashi became the new principal of the school. Under his leadership, the school became the first to partner with the University of Hawaiʻi's early college program. He later became Superintendent of the Hawaii Department of Education.

In August 2022, Zachary Sheets became the new principal.

In 2023, the Academic Care Center was opened, a school-based health clinic operated by students within the school's Health Academy.

== Academics ==
=== Graduation requirements ===
Per the Board of Education, the school requires four credits in English and social studies and three credits in science and mathematics. For electives, students are required to take 2 credits in either fine arts, world language, or Career and Technical Education, one credit in physical education, and half a credit in health, for a total of 24 credits.

For dual-credit options, the school offers advanced placement (AP) and Early College classes for 10th-12th graders, along with Running Start classes which are offered through the University of Hawaiʻi system. As of the 2026-2027 school year, the school offers nineteen AP classes, including AP United States History, AP English Language and Composition, AP Calculus, and AP African American Studies. As of 2026, 33%

=== Career academies ===
The school offers "wall to wall" smaller learning career academies, in order to allow for students to have a more meaningful education surrounding their interests. The academies are certified by the National Career Academy Coalition and have model distinction.

== Clubs ==
In November 2015, Waipahu High School's Slam Poetry Team, Verbal Ammunition, was rewarded with the Can You Kick It Award at the Ninth Annual Interscholastic Team Teen Poetry Slam, hosted by Pacific Tongues.

== Sports ==
Waipahu High School fields teams in the following sports:

SPORTS
| SEASONS | Boys and Girls | Boys | Girls |
| FALL | Bowling, Cheerleading, Cross Country, Air Riflery, Soft Tennis | Football | Softball, Volleyball |
| WINTER | Basketball, Paddling, Soccer, Swimming, Wrestling | Baseball | Tennis |
| SPRING | Golf, Judo, Tennis, Track and Field | Baseball, Volleyball | Softball, Water Polo |

WHS competes in the OIA Western Division. Waipahu also competes in HHSAA Division I competition, except for the sports without divisional affiliation. [Those sports are air riflery, bowling, cross country, judo, paddling, tennis, track, golf, and wrestling.]

- The 2003-2004 Junior Varsity Cheerleading squad were the OIA West JV Champions.
- The 2004-2005 Varsity Football team was the OIA White Division Champion runner-up but later lost in the State Division II playoffs.
- The 2004-2005 Varsity Cheerleading squad were the Aloha International Small Co-ed National Champions and holds the only athletic national title in its school's history.
- The 2006-2007 Varsity Football team was the OIA White Division Champion but later lost in the State Division II playoffs to Kauai High School in the semifinals.
- The 2007-2008 Boys Varsity Baseball team were the OIA West Division II regular season champions and later winning the OIA White Division Championship.
- The 2008-2009 Boys Baseball team repeated as OIA West Division II regular season champions and OIA White Division Championship.
- The 2005-2006 Boys Varsity Volleyball team won the first OIA White Division Championship in a sweep of Aiea.
- The 2008-2009 Boys Varsity Volleyball team were OIA White West Champions and OIA White runner up.
- The 2009-2010 Boys Varsity Baseball team were OIA White Division runner up.
- The 2010-2011 Boys Varsity Soccer team were the OIA White Division Champions.
- The 2011-2012 Girls Varsity Soccer team were the OIA White Division Champions.
- The 2011-2012 Boys Varsity Baseball team were OIA White Champions and won their First State Division II Title in school's history completing a perfect season of 15–0.
- The 2016-2017 Girls Varsity Soccer team were the OIA White Division Champions.
- The 2017-2018 Boys Varsity Football team were the OIA White Division Champions.
- The 2018 Boys Varsity Football team were OIA Red Champions and won their first State Division I Title in school's history.
- The 2018-2019 Boys JV Soccer team were the OIA Division II Champions.
- The 2023 Boys Varsity Football team were HHSAA D1 State Champions, beating Konawaena 53–28 on November 25, 2023.

== Notable alumni ==
Listed alphabetically by last name (year of graduation):

- Ben Apuna (1976) - professional athlete, National Football League, New York Giants (1980)
- Nestor Garcia (1975) - Hawaii State Representative
- Daisy Hartsfield - Hawaii State Representative
- Rachele Lamosao - Hawaii State Senator
- Tina Machado (1977) - Miss Hawaii USA in 1985
- Greg "Da Bull" Noll (1955) - Former professional surfer
- Tetsuo Ochikubo - painter, sculptor, and printmaker
- Herbert K. Pililaau (1948) - Medal of Honor recipient during the Korean War
- Brian Viloria (1998) - 2005 WBC Light Flyweight Champion; 2009 IBF Junior Flyweight Champion (Boxing)
- Falaniko Vitale (1992) - Former World MMA Middleweight Champion (Mixed martial arts)
- Jeff Williams (1990) - Former professional baseball player (Los Angeles Dodgers)
- Jerome Williams (1999) - 1st round MLB draft pick (SF Giants)
