= Helene Hale =

American politician (1918–2013)

Member of the Hawaii House of Representatives from the 4th district
- In office 2000–2006
- Succeeded by: Faye Hanohano

Personal details
- Born: Helene Eleanor Hilyer; March 23, 1918 Minneapolis, Minnesota, U.S.
- Died: February 1, 2013 (aged 94) Hilo, Hawaii, U.S.
- Party: Democratic
- Spouse(s): William Hale (div. 1967) Richard Kiyota (m. 1978)
- Relatives: Ralph Bunche (uncle)

Helene Eleanor Hale (née Hilyer; March 23, 1918 – February 1, 2013) was an American politician from the state of Hawaii.

== Biography ==
Hale was born Helene Eleanor Hilyer in Minneapolis, Minnesota on March 23, 1918. She was multiracial, her grandfather was the first African-American to graduate from the University of Minnesota and her uncle Ralph Bunche was the first African American to win the Nobel Peace Prize. Hale was a member of Alpha Kappa Alpha. She married William Hale, a teacher from Nashville, and the two taught in California before deciding to move to Kona after hearing about the town in a Don Blanding poem in 1947. She then taught in public schools and opened Menehune Book Store.

From 1955 until 1963 she served on the Hawaiʻi County Council. From 1963 until 1965 she was the County's Chairman and Executive Officer, which is now the Mayor of Hawaiʻi County. In that position, she was the first woman to serve as a mayor in Hawaii. The Merrie Monarch Festival began in 1963 when Hale, then Executive Officer of Hawaii, decided to create an event to increase tourism to the Island of Hawaii. She was featured on the cover of Ebony in 1963 and described as "Hawaii's Top Woman Politician."

Hale served as a delegate to the 1978 Hawaii State Constitutional Convention. In 2000, at the age of 82, Hale won a seat in the Hawaii House of Representatives as a Democrat. She served six years representing the 4th district in the legislature before retiring in 2006 following a stroke.

== See also ==
- List of first African-American mayors
