= Jon Karamatsu =

American politician

Vice Speaker of the Hawaii House of Representatives
- In office 2007
- Preceded by: Mark Takai
- Succeeded by: Pono Chong

Member of the Hawaii House of Representatives from the 41st district
- In office 2002–2010
- Preceded by: Redistricted
- Succeeded by: Ty Cullen

Personal details
- Born: December 21, 1974 (age 51) Honolulu, Hawaii
- Party: Democratic
- Education: University of Hawaii at Manoa, Gonzaga University
- Profession: attorney

Jon Riki Karamatsu is a former Democratic member of the Hawaii House of Representatives, representing the state's 41st district from 2002 to 2011.

On October 16, 2007, at about 1:15 a.m., Karamatsu lost control of his vehicle and struck a concrete pillar while travelling west-bound on the Moanalua Freeway. Karamatsu failed a police sobriety test and was found to have a blood alcohol content of .171 - more than twice the legal limit of .08. Karamatsu had previously been cited by law enforcement for speeding violations.

As a result of the October 2007 incident, Karamatsu stepped down from his position as Vice Speaker of the Hawaii House of Representatives.

In November 2008, it was announced that Karamatsu would serve as Chair of the House Judiciary Committee.

In 2010, instead of running for re-election in his house seat, Karamatsu decided to run for lieutenant governor. However, in the primary election, he came in at sixth place.

Karamatsu was later arrested twice more for allegedly driving under the influence of alcohol on April 4, 2015 and February 16, 2026.
