= Corey Rosenlee =

American politician

- Rosenlee in 2018

Member of the Hawaii House of Representatives from the 39th district
- Incumbent
- Assumed office November 3, 2026
- Preceded by: Elijah Pierick

Personal details
- Born: 1972 or 1973 (age 53–54)
- Party: Democratic
- Website: Campaign website

Corey Rosenlee is an American politician. A member of the Democratic Party, he has served in the Hawaii House of Representatives since 2026, representing the 39th district. He was elected at the 2026 election. The district contains Royal Kunia, Village Park, Honouliuli, Ho'opili and a portion of Waipahu. He was previously a candidate for the district in 2022 and 2024.

== Early life and education ==
Rosenlee grew up in Hawaiʻi Kai and graduated from Henry J. Kaiser High School in 1991. He graduated from the University of Hawaiʻi at Mānoa.

== Career ==
Rosenlee is a schoolteacher by profession and has taught social studies at James Campbell High School. He is a trade unionist and served as the president of the Hawaii State Teachers Association from 2015 to 2021.
