= Kaniela Ing =

American politician

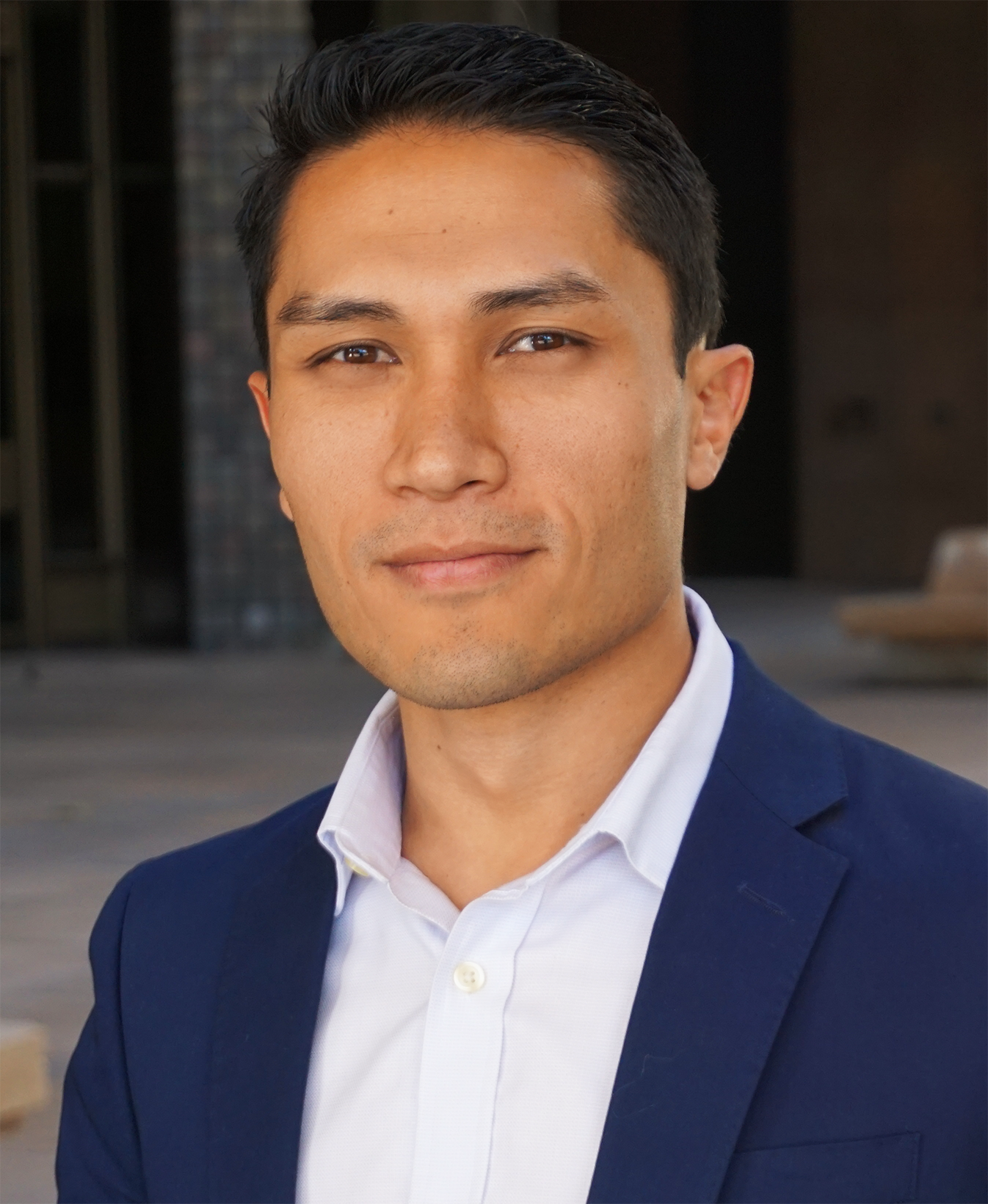
- Ing in 2017

Member of the Hawaii House of Representatives from the 11th district
- In office November 7, 2012 – November 6, 2018
- Preceded by: George Fontaine
- Succeeded by: Tina Wildberger

Personal details
- Born: December 24, 1988 (age 37) Maui, Hawaii, U.S.
- Party: Democratic
- Other political affiliations: Democratic Socialists of America
- Spouse: Khara Jabola-Carolus
- Children: 2
- Education: University of Hawaii
- Profession: American politician
- Website: www.kanielaing.com

Mark Kaniela Saito Ing (born December 24, 1988) is an American politician and community organizer who was a member of the Hawaii House of Representatives from the 11th District, representing south Maui from November 7, 2012, until November 6, 2018. He unsuccessfully ran to represent Hawaii's 1st District in the U.S. House of Representatives in the 2018 federal election.

In January 2023, Ing became the first national director of the Green New Deal Network. The network concluded its work at the end of 2025.

Ing has also served as Climate Justice Director for People’s Action where he leads national campaigns to combat climate change. He serves on various coalitions including the United National Frontline Table, Climate Power Advisory Board, and the Hawai’i Community Bail Fund’s board of directors.

== Early life ==
Ing was born and raised in Hawaii. Ing attended Kamehameha Schools Maui, Maui Community College, the University of Hawaii at Manoa, and American University in Washington D.C. Ing served as UH student-body president, as a neighborhood board member, and has worked in various capacities with Hawaii's business, government, and the non-profit sectors prior to assuming public office.

Ing's father died when Ing was a child. Ing worked as a harvester in the pineapple fields as a young teenager.

== Hawaii State House of Representatives (2012–2018) ==
Ing was elected to serve the 11th House District (South Maui: Kihei, Wailea, Makena) as a first-time candidate in 2012. Ing won the Democratic primary election, and overtook three opponents, carrying 43% of the vote. Ing then defeated Republican incumbent George Fontaine in the general election with 61% of the vote to the incumbent's 35%.

Ing was re-elected in the 2014 primary and general elections. In 2016, Ing faced a Primary challenger, Deidre Tegarden, an aide to former Hawaii Governor Neil Abercrombie. Ing prevailed with 61% of the vote to his opponent's 34%.

=== Marriage equality and LGBT rights ===
In November 2013, then-Governor Neil Abercrombie convened a special election for the purpose of conducting public hearings to consider the adoption of a law that would legalize marriage for same-sex couples in Hawaii. Ing supported the legislation, delivering a speech during the final floor vote in the House in which he spoke about how the murder of Matthew Shepard impacted him as a young man and led to his eventual recognition of the need for equal rights for LGBT Americans despite his Christian background.

=== Same-day and automatic voter registration ===
In 2013 and 2014, Ing introduced a bill to provide for a same-day voter registration law. With the support of Common Cause, the League of Women Voters, and Faith Action for Community Equity (FACE), the revised bill passed and was signed into law on July 1, 2014. The law has allowed voters to register and vote during a single visit at all early-polling places in Hawaii starting in 2016, and at all polling places on election day starting in 2018.

=== Mark Zuckerberg's quiet title action ===
In 2016, Facebook founder Mark Zuckerberg purchased 700 acres (280 hectares) of beachfront land on the island of Kauai. Zuckerberg initiated quiet title and adverse possession lawsuits against a number of Native Hawaiian families who held "Kuleana" land rights within his 700-acre (280-hectare) Kauai property. Ing called for mediation and community outreach and quipped that "in Hawaii... we don't initiate conversation by filing a lawsuit against our neighbors." Ing argued that the legal mechanisms Zuckerberg attempted to use were predatory by nature as they have been used historically to "displace Native Hawaiians from their ancestral lands." Zuckerberg ultimately dropped the lawsuits and offered an apology.

=== 2016 arrest ===
In January 2016, Ing was cited for failure to produce proof of insurance for a vehicle he owned. A bench warrant dated February 18, 2016, was issued after he missed a court hearing on the citation; Ing said he had not seen the court notice because the Legislature was in session on Oahu. He was arrested on the warrant in late July 2016, weeks before the Democratic primary. A subsequent court date was scheduled.

=== Campaign spending violations ===
On June 20, 2018, the Hawaii Campaign Spending Commission approved a $15,422 administrative fine based on allegations that Ing filed 23 consecutive inaccurate reports during the period of May 2011 to December 2016. In total, Ing was given notice of 31 campaign spending violations, with records showing his campaign accounts were used to pay rent to landlords and a credit card bill.

One commissioner sought to refer the matter to criminal prosecution, the other four commissioners disagreed and voted that the violations were not criminal and did not require prosecution, stating "there are not enough good politicians" and that criminal prosecution would have been fatal to Ing's political career.

On July 20, 2018, Ing fired his accountant after determining that his accountant had inadvertently filed the wrong version of his campaign finance report on July 15. The original report, which was quickly corrected on July 16, identified a $262,830 cash balance. The corrected report corrected the balance to $100,847. The accountant confirmed his mistake in a subsequent release.

On August 28, 2023, Ing pled no contest to a criminal charge made by the Honolulu Prosecutor's office of failure to timely file a supplemental report with the Campaign Spending Commission.

== Campaign for Hawaii's first congressional district ==
In November 2017, Ing announced his intention to run for Hawaii's 1st congressional district, where incumbent Congresswoman Colleen Hanabusa was retiring to challenge Governor David Ige in the Democratic primary for Governor of Hawaii. Ing's candidacy received widespread attention and support from the left, receiving the endorsement of the Democratic Socialists of America, Justice Democrats, Our Revolution, the Democratic nominee for New York's 14th congressional district Alexandria Ocasio-Cortez, California Congressman Ro Khanna and Washington Congresswoman Pramila Jayapal. He received attention for his campaign ads and his pledge for universal housing.

Ing finished fourth in the Democratic primary, won by former Congressman Ed Case. He drew 7,531 votes, or 6.3%.

== Current work ==
In January 2023, Ing was announced as the first-ever national director for the Green New Deal Network. He was a founding member of the organization, which works to campaign for local Green New Deal policies and public support for climate justice.

Ing also co-leads Our Hawaii Action, a progressive super PAC. In 2022, Our Hawaii Action raised hundreds of thousands of dollars in an unsuccessful effort to unseat U.S. Rep. Ed Case due to criticism of Case's perceived lack of support for climate legislation in President Biden’s Build Back Better Plan. In August 2023, Our Hawaii Action set up the Maui Community Power Recovery Fund to support victims of the 2023 Maui fires, but concerns were raised about donations potentially going to support political candidates.

== See also ==
- List of Democratic Socialists of America who have held office in the United States
