= Clift Tsuji =

American politician

Member of the Hawaii House of Representatives from the 2nd district 3rd (2004–2012)
- In office November 2, 2004 – November 15, 2016
- Preceded by: Eric Hamakawa
- Succeeded by: Chris Toshiro Todd

Personal details
- Born: January 20, 1941 Papaikou, Hawaii
- Died: November 15, 2016 (aged 75) Honolulu, Hawaii
- Party: Democratic
- Education: University of Hawaii at Manoa

Clifton 'Clift' K. Tsuji (January 20, 1941 – November 15, 2016) was an American politician who served in the Hawaii House of Representatives from 2005 until his death in 2016. A Democrat, Tsuji represented District 2 from January 16, 2013, until his death on November 15, 2016. Tsuji consecutively served from January 2005 until 2013 in the District 3 seat. Tsuji died on November 15, 2016, at the age of 75 at Queen's Medical Center in Honolulu.

== Education ==
Tsuji earned his BA in speech from the University of Hawaii at Manoa.

== Elections ==
In 2004, when Democratic Representative Eric Hamakawa retired and left the District 3 seat open, Tsuji won the September 18, 2004, Democratic primary with 3,482 votes (66.4%), and won the November 2, 2004, general election with 5,696 votes (61.1%) against Republican nominee Andy Smith, who had lost the 2002 general election to Hamakawa.

In 2006, Tsuji was unopposed for the September 26, 2006, Democratic primary, winning with 5,510 votes, and won the November 7, 2006, general election with 6,695 votes (80.6%) against Republican nominee Fabian Toribio.

In 2008, Tsuji was unopposed for the September 20, 2008, Democratic primary, winning with 5,086 votes, and won the November 4, 2008, general election with 7,958 votes (79.7%) against Republican nominee Deirdre Tavares.

In 2010, Tsuji was unopposed for the September 18, 2010, Democratic primary, winning with 5,532 votes, and won the November 2, 2010, general election with 6,917 votes (78.7%) against Republican nominee Tania Cortez-Camero.

In 2012, Tsuji was redistricted to District 2, and with Democratic Representative Jerry Chang retiring, Tsuji was unopposed for both the August 11, 2012, Democratic primary, winning with 5,814 votes, and the November 6, 2012, general election.
