= Ken Ito (politician) =

American politician (born 1944)

Member of the Hawaii House of Representatives from the 49th district 48th (1994–2012)
- In office November 1994 – November 2018
- Preceded by: Marshall Ige
- Succeeded by: Scot Matayoshi

Personal details
- Born: April 29, 1944 (age 82) Honolulu, Hawaii, U.S.
- Party: Democratic
- Education: University of Hawaii at Manoa (BEd)

Military service
- Branch/service: United States Air Force
- Years of service: 1962–1966

Ken Ito (born April 29, 1944, in Honolulu, Hawaii) is an American politician and a former Democratic member of the Hawaii House of Representatives from 2012 to 2018 representing District 49. Ito consecutively served from 1994 until 2012 in the District 48 seat.

== Education ==
Ito earned his BEd from the University of Hawaii at Manoa.

== Elections ==
- 1994 When Democratic Representative Marshall Ige left the District 48 seat open, Ito won the four-way September 17, 1994 Democratic Primary with 1,786 votes (36.4%), and was unopposed for the November 8, 1994 General election.
- 1996 Ito was unopposed for the September 21, 1996 Democratic Primary, winning with 4,082 votes, and won the November 5, 1996 General election with 5,638 votes (70.3%) against Republican nominee Roy Yanagihara.
- 1998 Ito was unopposed for the September 19, 1998 Democratic Primary, winning with 1,902 votes, and won the November 3, 1998 General election with 4,698 votes (54.2%) against Republican nominee Mako Hara.
- 2000 Ito was unopposed for the September 23, 2000 Democratic Primary, winning with 3,332 votes, and won the November 5, 2002 General election with 4,037 votes (52.4%) against Republican nominee Sam Moku.
- 2002 Ito and Mako were both unopposed for their September 21, 2002 primaries, setting up a rematch; Ito won the November 5, 2002 General election with 5,451 votes (56.5%) against Mako. who had been redistricted from District 6.
- 2004 Ito was unopposed for the September 18, 2004 Democratic Primary, winning with 4,111 votes, and won the November 2, 2004 General election with 5,610 votes (55.0%) against Republican nominee Keoki Leong.
- 2006 Ito was unopposed for the September 26, 2006 Democratic Primary, winning with 5,103 votes, and won the November 7, 2006 General election with 6,570 votes (75.3%) against Sol Naluai, who had run for Senate in 2000 and 2002.
- 2008 Ito was unopposed for both the September 20, 2008 Democratic Primary, winning with 4,030 votes, and the November 4, 2008 General election.
- 2010 Ito won the September 18, 2010 Democratic Primary with 4,499 votes (70.2%), and won the November 2, 2010 General election with 6,639 votes (70.7%) against Republican nominee Mo Radke.
- 2012 Redistricted to District 49, and with Democratic Representative Pono Chong redistricted to District 48, Ito was unopposed for both the August 11, 2012 Democratic Primary, winning with 6,194 votes, and the November 6, 2012 General election.
