= Joy San Buenaventura =

American politician

Joy A. San Buenaventura
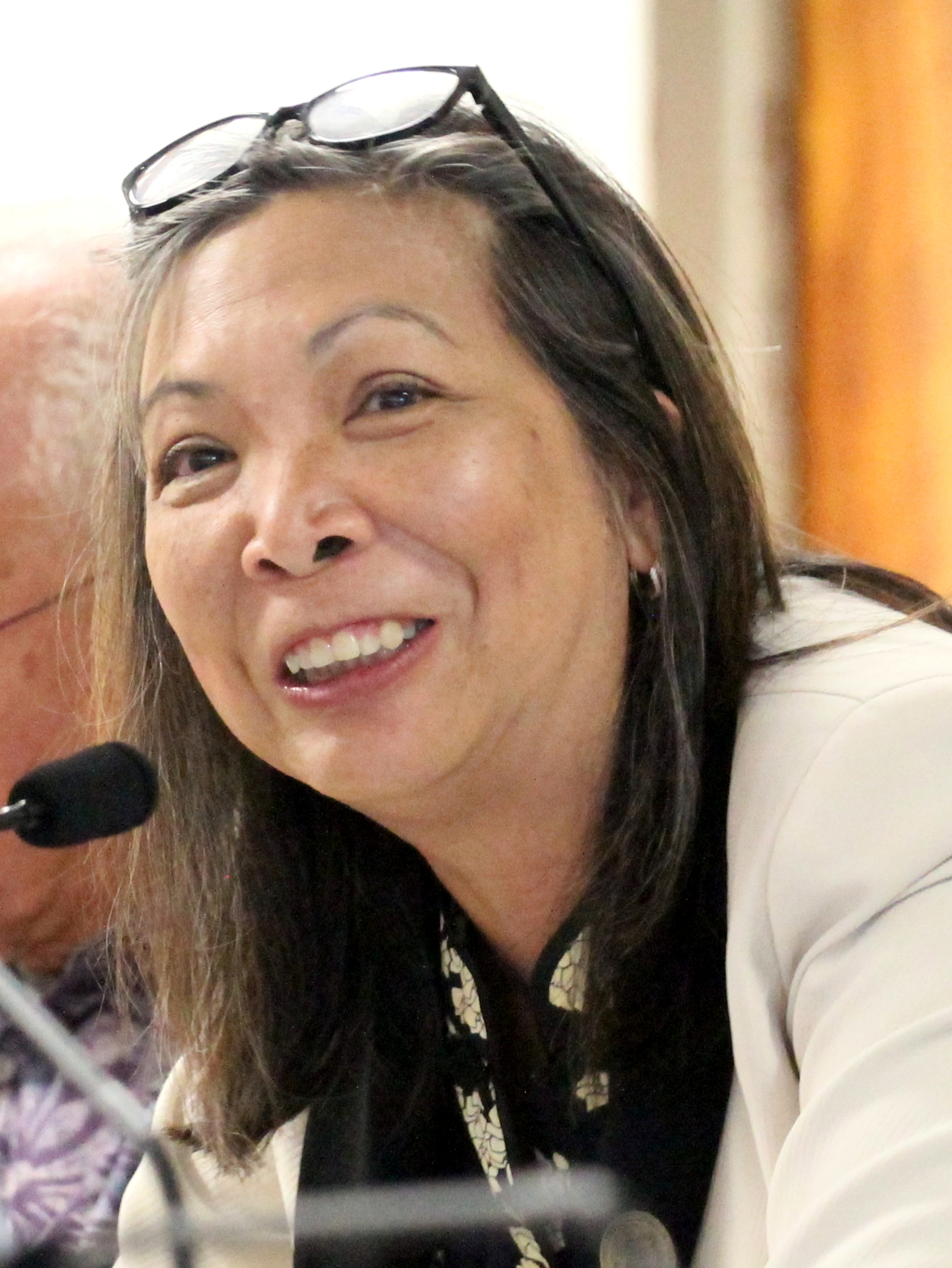
- San Buenaventura in 2020

Member of the Hawaii Senate from the 2nd district
- Incumbent
- Assumed office November 3, 2020
- Preceded by: Russell Ruderman

Member of the Hawaii House of Representatives from the 4th district
- In office November 4, 2014 – November 3, 2020
- Preceded by: Faye Hanohano
- Succeeded by: Greggor Ilagan

Personal details
- Born: 1959 (age 66–67) Manila, Philippines
- Party: Democratic
- Spouse: Sheldon
- Education: University of Nevada, Las Vegas (B.S., mathematics); University of California, Hastings College of the Law (J.D.)
- Profession: attorney

Joy Anne San Buenaventura (born 1959) is an American Democratic politician from Hawaii. She represented District 4 in the Hawaii House of Representatives and is currently a member of the Hawaii Senate from the 2nd district.

== Political career ==
San Buenaventura first entered the Hawaii political scene when she ran for the District 4 Democratic nomination for the Hawaii House of Representatives. The Democratic primary was a crowded one that included four challengers, including San Buenaventura, and incumbent representative Faye Hanohano, who had held the seat since 2006. San Buenaventura emerged as the only challenger to top Hanohano, and won the primary carrying 43.4% of the vote. In the general election, she faced Republican nominee Gary Thomas, whom she defeated by 43 points. She assumed office in the House in January 2015.

San Buenaventura opted to run for reelection to a second term in 2016, and faced no opposition from fellow Democrats. She advanced automatically to the general election, where she carried 75.5% of the vote against nonpartisan Luana Jones and Constitution Party candidate Moke Stephens. In 2018, San Buenaventura was elected to a third term in the House after she won the primary with no opposition and was later declared the winner of the race after the general election was cancelled. San Buenaventura was Majority Whip, Chair of the House Human Services and Homelessness Committee, and vice-chair of the House Judiciary Committee.

In May 2020, San Buenaventura announced that she would run for the District 2 seat in the Hawaii Senate, which was being vacated by outgoing Senator Russell Ruderman. She defeated Democratic challenger Smiley Burrows in the August 8 primary, carrying 78.7% of the vote, and advanced to the general election in November to face Aloha ʻĀina Party candidate Ron Ka-Ipo. Her current term ends on November 3, 2026. San Buenaventura is currently the Chair of the Senate Committee on Health and Human Services, vice-chair of the Senate Committee on Hawaiian Affairs, and a member of the Senate Committee on Judiciary. She represents Pahoa, southeast of Hilo.

In March 2025, as Chair of the Committee on Human Services, Senator Buenaventura stopped a popular bill, House Bill 729, that sought to ban child marriage in Hawai'i. The bill would have raised the legal age of marriage, from 15 up to 18 years old. "In a statement, the senator said marriage can provide benefits to youth who are trying to escape an abusive family situation, are pregnant or want to get on their partner’s health insurance. “I am always leery of national advocacy groups who just want to notch Hawaiʻi as a win without taking into account the culture and circumstances here,” San Buenaventura said."

== Electoral history ==
=== Hawaii House of Representatives ===
Hawaii House of Representatives, District 4
Year	Candidate	Votes	Pct	Candidate	Votes	Pct	Candidate	Votes	Pct	Candidate	Votes	Pct	Candidate	Votes	Pct
2014 Democratic Primary	Joy San Buenaventura	1,628	43.4%	Faye Hanohano (inc.)	766	20.4%	Brian F. Jordan	549	14.6%	Leilani Bronson-Crelly	503	13.4%	Julia K. Peleiholani	304	8.1%
2014 General Election	Joy San Buenaventura	4,337	71.6%	Gary Thomas	1,719	28.4%									
2016 General Election	Joy San Buenaventura (inc.)	5,846	75.5%	Luana Jones	1,247	16.1%	Moke Stephens	648	8.4%						
2018 General Election	Joy San Buenaventura (inc.)	3,919	100.0%												

=== Hawaii Senate ===
Hawaii Senate, District 2
Year	Candidate	Votes	Pct	Candidate	Votes	Pct
2020 Democratic Primary	Joy San Buenaventura	7,763	78.7%	Smiley Burrows	2,103	21.3%
2020 General Election	Joy San Buenaventura			Ron Ka-Ipo		

== See also ==
- List of foreign-born United States politicians
