= Laura Thielen =

American politician (born 1961)

Member of the Hawaii Senate from the 25th district
- In office November 6, 2012 – November 3, 2020
- Preceded by: Pohai Ryan
- Succeeded by: Chris Lee

Personal details
- Born: March 25, 1961 (age 65) Los Angeles, California, U.S.
- Party: Democratic
- Parent: Cynthia Thielen (mother)
- Education: University of Colorado; Case Western Reserve University School of Law
- Profession: Lawyer
- Website: laurathielen.com

Laura H. Thielen (born March 25, 1961) is an American politician and was a Democratic member of the Hawaii Senate from 2012 to 2020 representing District 25. Thielen previously served as chair of the Hawaii Department of Land and Natural Resources from 2007 to 2010 under Governor Linda Lingle.

In 2021, the Honolulu City Council confirmed Thielen as director of the Honolulu Department of Parks and Recreation.

== Education ==
Thielen attended Punahou School. She earned her BA in political science from University of Colorado and her JD from Case Western Reserve University School of Law.

== Elections ==
- 2012 Thielen challenged incumbent Democratic Senator Pohai Ryan in the three-way August 11, 2012 Democratic Primary, winning with 6,236 votes (46.5%), and won the November 6, 2012 General election with 13,703 votes (57.1%) against Republican former Senator Fred Hemmings.

== Personal life ==
Thielen is the daughter of former Hawaii state representative Cynthia Thielen, who served with her in the Hawaii State Legislature at the same time.
