= Feki Pouha =

American politician

Member of the Hawaii House of Representatives from the 47th district
- In office November 2014 – November 8, 2016
- Preceded by: Richard Fale
- Succeeded by: Sean Quinlan

Personal details
- Born: Nafetalai 'Feki' N. F. Pouha Kahuku, Hawaii, U.S.
- Party: Republican
- Education: Brigham Young University

Nafetalai 'Feki' N. F. Pouha is an American politician. He served as a Republican member for the 47th district of the Hawaii House of Representatives.

Born in Kahuku, Hawaii, Pouha attended Brigham Young University. He is a member of the LDS Church. In 2014, Pouha was elected to the Hawaii House of Representatives representing the 47th district; he succeeded Richard Fale. In 2016, Pouha was succeeded by Sean Quinlan. He had earned 49.2 percent and Quinlan had earned 50.8 percent of votes.
