= 2006 United States Senate election in Hawaii =

- November 7, 2006
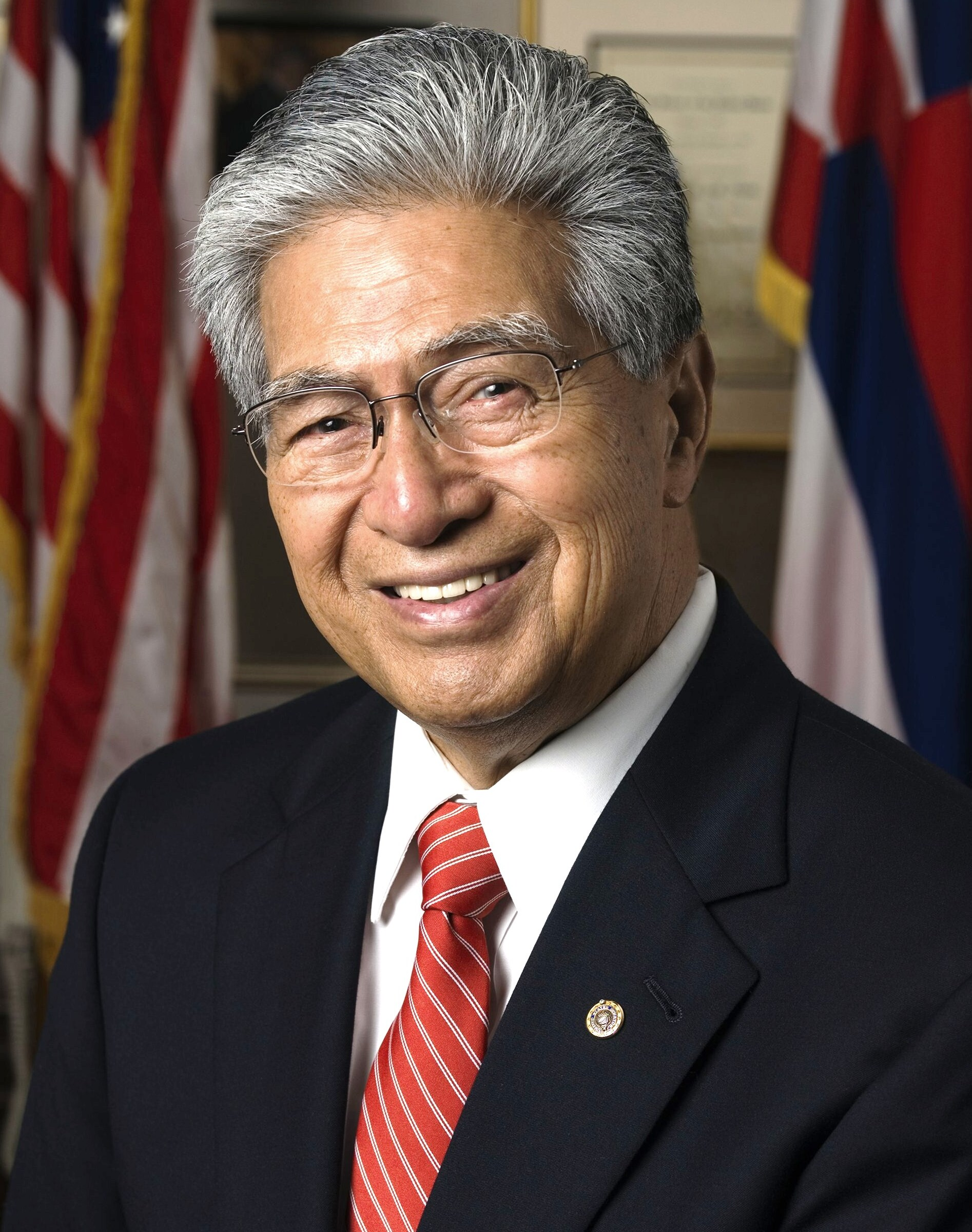

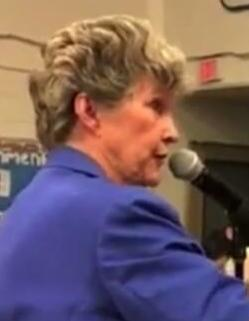
Nominee	Daniel Akaka	Cynthia Thielen
Party	Democratic	Republican
Popular vote	210,330	126,097
Percentage	61.35%	36.78%
- County results Akaka: 50–60% 60–70% 70–80%
U.S. senator before election
Daniel Akaka
Democratic
Elected U.S. Senator
Daniel Akaka
Democratic

The 2006 United States Senate election in Hawaii was held November 7, 2006. Incumbent Democrat Daniel Akaka won re-election to a third full term.

== Democratic primary ==
=== Candidates ===
- Daniel Akaka, incumbent U.S. Senator
- Ed Case, U.S. Representative

=== Campaign ===
Case had stated that although he has the deepest respect for Daniel Akaka, Hawaii is in a time of transition with regard to the state's representation in Congress which requires that the state phase in the next generation to provide continuity in that service. He had warned the state would lose all clout in Washington if the state's two US Senators (the other being Daniel Inouye), both of whom are over 80 years old, leave office within a short time of each other. If a Senator were to die, Hawaii election law requires that the governor appoint a replacement of the same party. Case's words would prove prescient, as Akaka would retire just over two weeks after Inouye's death in 2012.

Hawaii's other members of Congress, Inouye and Rep. Neil Abercrombie, pledged their support to Akaka.

=== Debates ===
- Complete video of debate, August 31, 2006

=== Polling ===
Source	Date	Daniel Akaka	Ed Case
QMark Research & Polling	May 15, 2006	40%	38%
Honolulu Advertiser/Ward Research	July 2, 2006	51%	40%
Rasmussen	August 11, 2006	47%	45%
Honolulu Advertiser/Ward Research	September 17, 2006	51%	38%

=== Endorsements ===
Daniel Akaka

Organizations

- Council for a Livable World

=== Results ===
Democratic primary results
Party	Candidate	Votes	%
Democratic	Daniel Akaka (incumbent)	129,158	54.65%
Democratic	Ed Case	107,163	45.35%
Total votes		236,321	100%

== Republican primary ==
=== Candidates ===
- Mark Beatty, attorney and businessman
- Jerry Coffee, retired Navy captain, Vietnam War POW, and motivational speaker (withdrew from the race before the Republican primary but his name still appeared on the ballot)
- Charles "Akacase" Collins
- Jay Friedheim, attorney and candidate for the U.S. Senate in 1998 and 2004
- Eddie Pirkowski, businessman
- Steve Tataii, conflict resolution teacher and author

=== Results ===
Republican primary results
Party	Candidate	Votes	%
Republican	Jerry Coffee	10,139	41.01
Republican	Mark Beatty	6,057	24.50
Republican	Akacase Collins	3,146	12.72
Republican	Jay Friedheim	2,299	9.30
Republican	Steve Tataii	1,601	6.48
Republican	Eddie Pirkowski	1,482	5.99
Total votes		24,724	100

Hawaii State Representative Cynthia Thielen was selected to be the Republican nominee after Jerry Coffee, who had previously withdrawn his candidacy, won the primary.

== General election ==
=== Candidates ===
- Daniel Akaka (D), incumbent U.S. Senator
- Cynthia Thielen (R), Hawaii State Representative
- Lloyd Mallan (L), perennial candidate

=== Predictions ===
Source	Ranking	As of
The Cook Political Report	Solid D	November 6, 2006
Sabato's Crystal Ball	Safe D	November 6, 2006
Rothenberg Political Report	Safe D	November 6, 2006
Real Clear Politics	Safe D	November 6, 2006

=== Polling ===
Source	Date	Daniel Akaka (D)	Cynthia Thielen (R)
Rasmussen	August 11, 2006	58%	30%

This election was closer than other elections Daniel Akaka was in, likely due to Linda Lingle's re-election coattails from the concurrent governor election.

=== Results ===
General election results
Party	Candidate	Votes	%	±%
Democratic	Daniel Akaka (incumbent)	210,330	61.35%	−11.5%
Republican	Cynthia Thielen	126,097	36.78%	+12.3%
Libertarian	Lloyd Mallan	6,415	1.87%	+1.0%
Majority		84,233	24.57%	
Turnout		342,842		
Democratic hold		Swing		

==== By county ====
County	Daniel Akaka Democratic		Cynthia Thielen Republican		Jeff Mallan Libertarian		Margin		Total votes cast
County	#	%	#	%	#	%	#	%	Total votes cast
Hawaii	30,367	63.6%	16,115	33.7%	1,295	2.7%	14,252	29.9%	47,777
Honolulu	139,330	59.1%	92,762	39.3%	3,802	1.6%	46,568	19.8%	235,894
Kauaʻi	14,505	70.1%	5,817	28.1%	376	1.8%	8,688	42.0%	20,698
Maui	25,916	67.8%	11,369	29.7%	932	2.4%	14,547	38.1%	38,217
Totals	210,330	61.3%	126,097	36.8%	6,415	1.9%	84,233	24.5%	342,842

== See also ==
- 2006 United States Senate elections
