= Linda Ichiyama =

American politician

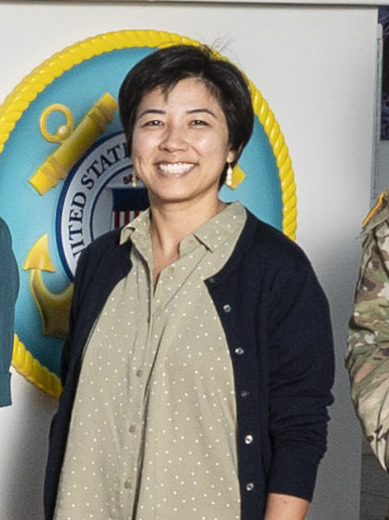
- Ichiyama in 2024

Vice Speaker of the Hawaii House of Representatives
- Incumbent
- Assumed office January 15, 2025
- Preceded by: Greggor Ilagan

Member of the Hawaii House of Representatives from the 32nd district 31st (2011–2013)
- Incumbent
- Assumed office 2011
- Preceded by: Glenn Wakai

Personal details
- Born: Honolulu, Hawaii, U.S.
- Party: Democratic
- Spouse: Pono Chong
- Children: 2
- Education: Georgetown University (BA); University of Hawaiʻi at Mānoa (JD)
- Website: Official website

Linda Eileen Ichiyama Chong (née Ichiyama) is an American politician who has been a member of the Hawaii House of Representatives as a member of the Democratic Party since 2011, and is the Vice Speaker of the state house. Elected from the 31st district in 2010, she was redistricted into the 32nd district.

== Early life ==
Linda Eileen Ichiyama Chong was born in Salt Lake, Hawaii. She graduated from Moanalua High School, Georgetown University, and the William S. Richardson School of Law. She married Pono Chong, with whom she had two children.

== Career ==
In the 2010 election Ichiyama defeated three other candidates for the Democratic nomination for a seat in the Hawaii House of Representatives from the 31st district. She defeated Republican nominee Garner Shimizu in the general election. For the 2012 election she was redistricted into the 32nd district and defeated Shimizu. She defeated Marcia Ann. R. Tagavilla in 2014, faced no opposition in 2016, 2018, 2020, and 2022, and defeated Nancy A. Valdez in 2024.

During Ichiyama's tenure in the state house she served on the Transportation, Finance, Public Safety and Military Affairs, and Labor and Public Employment committees. She was a founding member of the Hawaii Women’s Legislative Caucus. The Red Hill Underground Fuel Storage Facility is located within her district and she was the co-chair of a special committee to deal with contamination from the site. In 2024, she was selected to serve as Vice Speaker of the state house.

== Political positions ==
Ichiyama supported legislation that increased the hotel tax from 13.25% to 14% in 2025.

== Works cited ==
=== Election results ===
- "2010 Election" (PDF). Hawaii. 2010. Archived (PDF) from the original on March 6, 2025.
- "2010 Primary Election" (PDF). Hawaii. 2010. Archived (PDF) from the original on March 6, 2025.
- "2012 Election" (PDF). Hawaii. 2012. Archived (PDF) from the original on March 6, 2025.
- "2012 Primary Election" (PDF). Hawaii. 2012. Archived (PDF) from the original on June 19, 2025.
- "2014 Election" (PDF). Hawaii. 2014. Archived (PDF) from the original on February 9, 2025.
- "2014 Primary Election" (PDF). Hawaii. 2014. Archived (PDF) from the original on February 8, 2025.
- "2016 Election" (PDF). Hawaii. 2016. Archived (PDF) from the original on March 8, 2025.
- "2016 Primary Election" (PDF). Hawaii. 2016. Archived (PDF) from the original on March 6, 2025.
- "2018 Election" (PDF). Hawaii. 2018. Archived (PDF) from the original on March 8, 2025.
- "2018 Primary Election" (PDF). Hawaii. 2018. Archived (PDF) from the original on June 2, 2025.
- "2020 Election" (PDF). Hawaii. 2020. Archived (PDF) from the original on March 17, 2025.
- "2020 Primary Election" (PDF). Hawaii. 2020. Archived (PDF) from the original on June 2, 2025.
- "2022 Election" (PDF). Hawaii. 2022. Archived (PDF) from the original on June 17, 2025.
- "2022 Primary Election" (PDF). Hawaii. 2022. Archived (PDF) from the original on March 11, 2025.
- "2024 Election" (PDF). Hawaii. 2024. Archived (PDF) from the original on June 17, 2025.
- "2024 Primary Election" (PDF). Hawaii. 2024. Archived (PDF) from the original on June 19, 2025.

=== News ===
- "Rep. Nadine Nakamura is named Hawaii's first female House speaker". KITV. November 7, 2024. Archived from the original on June 19, 2025.
- Consillio, Kristen (May 2, 2025). "Hawaii Legislature ends with tax on tourists to help mitigate climate change". KITV. Archived from the original on June 19, 2025.
- Huff, Daryl (November 28, 2023). "State and county propose 30-year, $750M plan to clean up Red Hill fuel pollution". Hawaii News Now. Archived from the original on June 19, 2025.
- Tsai, Michael (January 25, 2024). "Women's Legislative Caucus shares 2024 package". Spectrum News. Archived from the original on June 19, 2025.

=== Web ===
- "Financial Disclosure: FD-2018-000079". Hawaii State Ethics Commission's Public Documents System. February 27, 2018.
- "Linda Ichiyama's Biography". Vote Smart. Archived from the original on June 19, 2025.
- "Meet Linda". Linda Ichiyama. Archived from the original on June 19, 2025.
- "Representative Linda Ichiyama". Hawaii State Legislature. Archived from the original on November 14, 2012.

Hawaii House of Representatives
| Preceded by Greggor Ilagan | Vice Speaker of the Hawaii House of Representatives; 2024–present | Incumbent |
