= Russell Ruderman =

American politician

Member of the Hawaii Senate from the 2nd district
- In office November 6, 2012 – November 3, 2020
- Preceded by: Redistricted
- Succeeded by: Joy San Buenaventura

Personal details
- Party: Democratic
- Spouse: Dina
- Children: 3
- Education: Pennsylvania State University
- Profession: Business owner
- Website: russellruderman.com

Russell E. Ruderman is an American politician and was a Democratic member of the Hawaii Senate from 2012 to 2020 representing District 2.

== Education ==
Born to a Jewish family, Ruderman earned his BS in biology from Pennsylvania State University.

== Elections ==
- 2012 With Democratic Senator Gil Kahele redistricted to District 1, Ruderman won the District 2 four-way August 11, 2012 Democratic Primary with 3,106 votes (35.8%) in a field which included Representative Bob Herkes, and won the November 6, 2012 General election with 10,487 votes (71.5%) against Republican nominee Daryl Smith.
