= Rachele Lamosao =

American politician (born 1991)

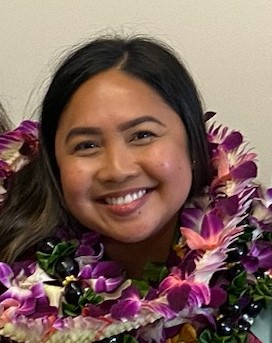
- Lamosao in 2023

Member of the Hawaii Senate from the 19th district
- Incumbent
- Assumed office January 21, 2026
- Preceded by: Henry Aquino

Member of the Hawaii House of Representatives from the 36th district
- In office November 8, 2022 – January 21, 2026
- Preceded by: Redistricted
- Succeeded by: Daisy Hartsfield

Personal details
- Born: February 14, 1991 (age 35) Honolulu, Hawaii, U.S.
- Party: Democratic
- Spouse: Justin Cadiz
- Children: 1
- Education: Leeward Community College (AA); University of Hawaiʻi at Mānoa (BA, MPA)
- Website: rachelelamosao.com

Rachele Fernandez Lamosao is an American politician serving in the Hawaii Senate for the 19th district. She previously served in the Hawaii House of Representatives, representing the 36th district (Waipahu). She won the seat in the 2022 election against Republican opponent Veamoniti Lautaha. In December 2025 she was appointed to the Senate.

== Early life and education ==
Lamosao was born in Honolulu and raised in Waipahu, Hawaii and attended August Ahrens Elementary School, Waipahu Intermediate School, and Waipahu High School. Her family immigrated from the Philippines in the 1980s. She received her Associates degree from Leeward Community College and went on to earn her Bachelor of Arts in political science and Master of Public Administration at the University of Hawaiʻi at Mānoa.

== Career ==
Lamosao worked as an office manager at the Hawaii State Legislature. She also worked for the Hawaii Farm Bureau as government relations manager and communications director. Lamosao has served as a member of the Waipahu Neighborhood Board and volunteers for Waipahu High School and Taste of Waipahu.

== Personal life ==
Lamosao is married to Justin Cadiz, a civil engineer who made the Democratic Party of Hawaiʻi's final list of candidates nominated to succeed her but ultimately withdrew.
