= Jerry Chang (politician) =

American politician

Member of the Hawaii House of Representatives from the 2nd district
- In office 1988–2012

Personal details
- Born: September 15, 1947 (age 78)
- Party: Democratic

Jerry L. Chang (born September 15, 1947) is a former American politician from the Democratic Party of Hawaii. He was a member of the Hawaii House of Representatives for 24 years. He represented the 2nd District in the Hawaii House of Representatives from 1988 to 2012. He retired in 2012 following redistricting which put him into the same district as fellow incumbent Mark Nakashima.
