= Jessica Wooley =

American politician

Member of the Hawaii House of Representatives from the 48th district 47th (2008–2012)
- In office November 2008 – 2014
- Preceded by: Colleen Meyer
- Succeeded by: Jarrett Keohokalole

Personal details
- Born: 1968 (age 57–58) Scottsdale, Arizona
- Party: Democratic
- Education: University of California, Santa Cruz; UC Berkeley School of Law
- Website: jessicawooley.com

Jessica Elaine Wooley (born 1968) is small business owner, lawyer and served as an American legislator and a Democratic member of the Hawaii House of Representatives since November 2008, representing District 47 until November 2012; after redistricting in 2012, Wooley represented District 48. Wooley consecutively served from 2009 until 2014, when she was appointed by Governor Neil Abercrombie as the Director for the Office of Environmental Quality Control.

== Education ==
Wooley earned her BA in economics from University of California, Santa Cruz, her MS in Agricultural and Resource Economics from the University of California, Berkeley, and her JD from its UC Berkeley School of Law.

== Elections ==
- Wooley, a lawyer, Democrat and advocate for civil, environmental and economic rights and justice (i.e., green growth and housing, clean water and energy, food security, school gardens, keeping Kahana residents on the land, protecting Native and wild plants and animals, etc.), first ran for office in 2008, beating Maria Pacheco in the Primary and beating long-time incumbent Republican Representative Colleen Meyer for the District 47 seat. Wooley won the September 20, 2008 Democratic Primary with 2,695 votes (67.7%), and won the November 4, 2008 General election with 4,934 votes (50.6%).
- 2010 Wooley was unopposed for the September 18, 2010 Democratic Primary, winning with 3,978 votes, and won the November 2, 2010 General election with 4,761 votes (57.4%), beating Republican nominee Richard Fale.
- 2012 Redistricting led to Wooley being switched to district 48. She had to run against then State House Majority Leader, Democratic Representative Pono Chong. Wooley won the August 11, 2012 Democratic Primary with 3,846 votes (54.5%) and was unopposed for the November 6, 2012 General election.
- Representative Wooley resigned her seat on May 5, 2014, after her Gubernatorial nomination, approval by the Senate and acceptance of the position as Director of the Office of Environmental Quality Control (OEQC); Director Wooley left OEQC at the end of 2015 and started her own company, `Āina Aloha Consulting, in 2016.
