= Khara Jabola-Carolus =

American government official

- Born: Southern California
- Education: New York University; University of Hawaii (JD)
- Occupation: Executive director
- Organisation: Hawaii State Commission on the Status of Women

Khara Jabola-Carolus is an American advocate for women and the current executive director of the Hawaii State Commission on the Status of Women, the only millennial to direct a statewide government agency in Hawaii.

== Early life and education ==
Jabola-Carolus grew up in Southern California. Her family is originally from Laguna, Philippines. She holds a degree in international politics from New York University and earned her Juris Doctor degree from the University of Hawaii, citing an uncle who had previously been deported as driving her to study law.

== Career ==
In 2018, Jabola-Carolus led the effort that codified Title IX into Hawaii state law. In the same year, she also co-authored a study that exposed the high rate of online sex purchasing in Hawaii. The release of the report led Jabola-Carolus to receive physical threats leading to a lockdown of her state office. The study also alleged that police officers asked for sex in exchange for "looking the other way".

Jabola-Carolus drove legislation allowing people to mark their gender as an "X" on their driver's license as well as being involved in the effort to pass legislation allowing sex workers to vacate a prostitution conviction. She also worked as director for the Hawaii Coalition for Immigrant Rights.

In 2023, Jabola-Carolus coauthored a report on the Lahaina wildfires that determined that 1 in 6 female survivors were forced to survival sex in order to secure temporary shelter. When the same statistic was quoted by United States secretary of homeland security Kristi Noem, Jabola-Carolus countered that the report's findings were being "twisted".

Jabola-Carolus is the current executive director of the Hawaii State Commission on the Status of Women. She is the only millennial in Hawaii to direct a statewide government agency.

=== Due to patriarchy ===
In July 2020, during COVID-19 lockdowns, Jabola-Carolus set her work email address to send the following out-of-office message:

Aloha, Due to patriarchy, I am behind in emails. I hope to respond to your message soon, but, like many women, I am working full-time while tending to an infant and toddler full-time. According to the Washington Post, the average length of an uninterrupted stretch of work time for parents during COVID-19 was three minutes, 24 seconds.

After going viral on social media, Jabola-Carolus urged other women to not "suffer silently" and help draw attention to the pandemic's impact on women.
