= Cynthia Thielen =

American politician

- Thielen speaks at MCAS Kaneohe Bay in 2018

Member of the Hawaii House of Representatives
- In office November 6, 1990 – November 3, 2020
- Preceded by: Ed Bybee
- Succeeded by: Patrick Branco
- Constituency: 19th district (1990–1992); 49th district (1992-2002); 50th district (2002–2020)

Personal details
- Born: September 22, 1933 (age 93) Los Angeles, California, U.S.
- Party: Republican
- Spouse: Mickey Thielen
- Children: 4, including Laura
- Education: Case Western Reserve University (attended); Stanford University (attended); University of Hawaii, Manoa (BA, JD)
- Website: Official website

Cynthia Henry Thielen (born September 22, 1933) is an American politician who served as a member of the Hawaii House of Representatives representing District 50, the Kailua and Kaneohe Bay areas of Oahu County. A Republican, she served in the state House of Representatives from 1990 until 2020. She served as minority floor leader from 1992 to 1997 and was the assistant minority leader at the time of her retirement.

She was the Republican nominee for United States Senate in 2006, challenging incumbent Democrat Daniel Akaka. She lost to Akaka, 62% to 38%, in the general election.

== Political Positions ==
Representative Thielen has described herself as a "progressive Republican" and has been described as a moderate Republican. The American Conservative Union gives Rep. Thielen a 28% rating.

She supports abortion rights. She was supported during her 2006 US Senate campaign by The WISH List, which supports pro-abortion rights Republican women. In her 2018 reelection campaign, she was endorsed by Planned Parenthood's political arm.

In 2013, she was the only Republican in the Hawaii House of Representatives to support same-sex marriage.

== Biography ==
Thielen was born in Los Angeles, California. She attended Stanford University, Case Western Reserve University, and the University of Hawaiʻi, graduating with a degree in law. She is a founding member of the Law Review.

After 30 years, Thielen retired from her role as a state legislator, opting not to run in the 2020 general election.

Thielen's daughter, former Hawaii state senator Laura Thielen, served with her in the Hawaii State Legislature at the same time.

== See also ==
- 2006 United States Senate election in Hawaii

Party political offices
Preceded by Jerry Coffee; Withdrew	Republican nominee for U.S. Senator from Hawaii (Class 1); 2006	Succeeded by Linda Lingle
