= Takashi Ohno =

American politician

Member of the Hawaii House of Representatives from the 27th district
- In office November 6, 2012 – November 8, 2022
- Preceded by: Corinne Ching
- Succeeded by: Redistricted

Personal details
- Born: Kodiak Island, Alaska
- Party: Democratic
- Education: Linfield College (BA); Chaminade University of Honolulu (MEd)

Takashi Ohno (born on Kodiak Island, Alaska) is an American politician who was a Democratic member of the Hawaii House of Representatives for District 27 from 2012 to 2022.

Ohno announced in March 2022 that he would not be running for re-election in the 2022 Hawaii House of Representatives election, and planned to leave the Legislature to work in the private sector when his term ended.

== Education ==
Ohno earned his bachelor's degree in education from Linfield College and his MEd from Chaminade University of Honolulu.

== Elections ==
- 2012 Challenging incumbent Republican Representative Corinne Ching for the District 27 seat, Ohno was unopposed for the District 27 August 11, 2012 Democratic Primary, winning with 3,986 votes, and won the November 6, 2012 General election with 4,843 votes (55.6%) against Representative Ching, who had held the seat since 2003.
