= Robert Herkes (politician) =

American politician (1931–2014)

Member of the Hawaii House of Representatives from the 5th District
- In office 1992–2012

Member of the Hawaii State Senate
- In office 1988–1988

Personal details
- Born: January 24, 1931 Iloilo, Philippines
- Died: August 21, 2014 (aged 83) Hilo, Hawaii
- Party: Democratic
- Education: City College of San Francisco; Cornell College

Robert Neil "Bob" Herkes (January 24, 1931 – August 21, 2014) was an American politician from the Democratic Party of Hawaii. Herkes served in the Hawaii City Council, Hawaii House of Representatives and Hawaii State Senate.

== Biography ==
He was born in Iloilo, Philippines on January 24, 1931. Herkes died on August 21, 2014.
