= Faye Hanohano =

American politician (born 1953)

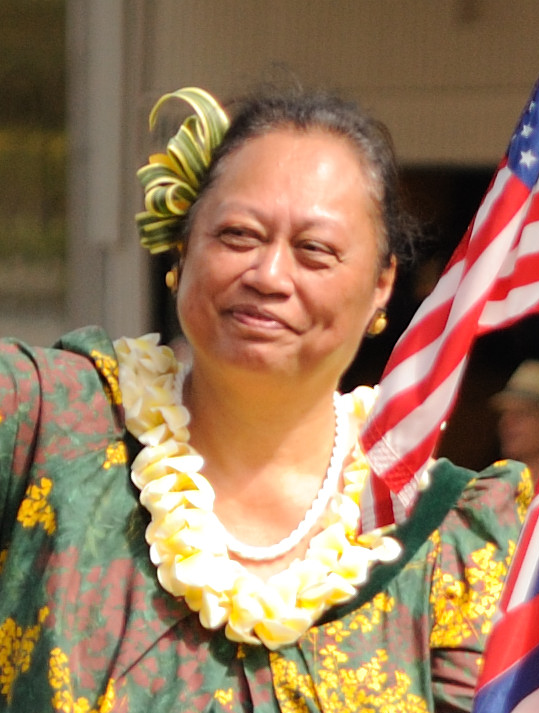
- Hanohano in 2012

Member of the Hawaii House of Representatives from the 4th district
- In office November 2008 – November 2014
- Preceded by: Helene Hale
- Succeeded by: Joy San Buenaventura

Personal details
- Born: December 21, 1953 (age 72) Hilo, Hawaii
- Party: Democratic
- Education: Hawaii Community College; University of Hawaii at Hilo; University of Phoenix

Faye Pua Hanohano (born December 21, 1953) is an American politician and was a Democratic member of the Hawaii House of Representatives from November 2008 to November 2014 representing District 4. Hanohano is a member of the National Conference of State Legislatures.

== Education ==
Hanohano earned her AD in political science from Hawaii Community College, her BA in sociology from the University of Hawaii at Hilo, and earned her MBA from the University of Phoenix.

== Elections ==
- 2006 When Democratic Representative Helene Hale retired and left the District 4 seat open, Hanohano won the four-way September 26, 2006, Democratic primary with 1,183 votes (26.0%), and won the three-way November 7, 2006, general election with 3,307 votes (48.6%) against Republican nominee Brian Jordan and Libertarian candidate Aaron Anderson, both of whom had previously sought the seat.
- 2008 Hanohano won the three-way September 20, 2008, Democratic primary with 1,934 votes (42.7%), and won the November 4, 2008, general election with 5,324 votes (50.9%) against Republican nominee Fred Blas.
- 2010 Hanohano won the September 18, 2010, Democratic primary with 2,314 votes (47.4%), and won the November 2, 2010, general election with 4,438 votes (54.0%) against Republican nominee Marlene Hapai.
- 2012 Hanohano was unopposed for the August 11, 2012, Democratic primary, winning with 3,373 votes, and won the November 6, 2012, general election against a nonpartisan candidate.
- 2014 Hanohano ran for re-election, but lost in the democratic primary to Joy A. San Buenaventura, garnering 766 votes (20.4%) versus her opponent's 1,628 votes (43.4%). The loss came after Hanohano was involved in a pair of racially charged incidents that garnered widespread local news coverage.
- 2018 Hanohano attempted to win election as a Trustee to the Office of Hawaiian Affairs. She advanced through the primary but failed to gain one of three open seats in the general election, finishing sixth.

== Controversies ==
In 2013, Hanohano became offended as workers for Hawaii's State Foundation on Culture and the Arts were hanging several works of art in her capitol office. Hanohano confronted the workers, stating that she did not want any art created by "Haoles, Japs or Pakes" and threatened to cut the department's funding. She later apologized for the racially charged comments in a speech before the House of Representatives whose sincerity would be questioned by local observers.

In 2014, Hanohano again faced controversy over racially insensitive comments, this time on the floor of the House. During a meeting of the Ocean Management and Hawaiian Affairs committee that she chairs, Rep. Hanohano responded to testimony of Hawaii Pacific University student Aarin Jacobs about measures to protect sea life by angrily demanding to know why "all of you westerners want to come over here and tell us what to do". It was reported on March 1, 2014, that the Hawaiian House of Representatives has launched an investigation into the matter, but that Rep. Hanohano had refused to apologize for the remark.
