= Pono Chong =

American politician

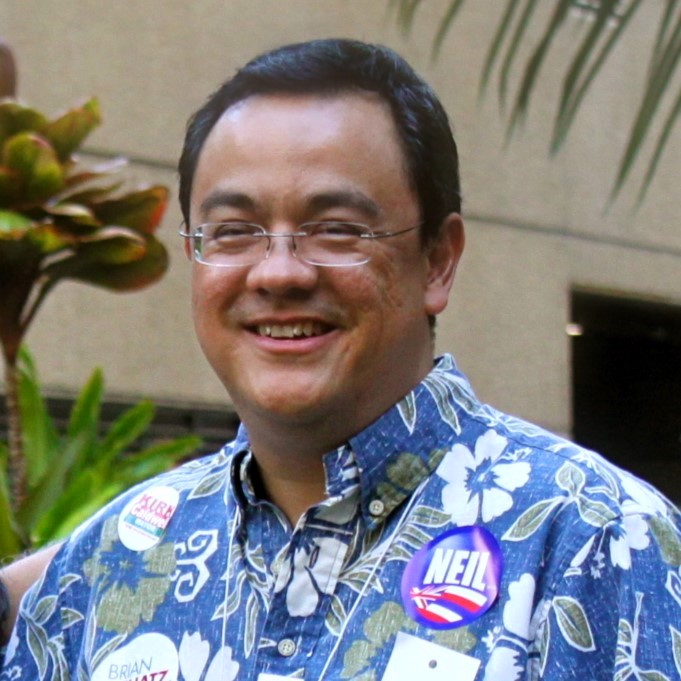
- Chong in 2012

Vice Speaker of the Hawaii House of Representatives
- In office 2008
- Preceded by: Jon Karamatsu
- Succeeded by: Michael Magaoay

Majority Leader of the Hawaii House of Representatives
- In office 2011–2012
- Preceded by: Blake Oshiro
- Succeeded by: Scott Saiki

Member of the Hawaii House of Representatives from the 49th district
- In office 2004–2012
- Preceded by: David Pendleton
- Succeeded by: Redistricted

Personal details
- Born: August 27, 1970 (age 56) Honolulu, Hawaii
- Party: Democratic
- Spouse: Linda Ichiyama
- Children: 2
- Education: University of Hawaiʻi at Mānoa

Dwight Pono Chong (born August 27, 1970) is an American politician from Hawaii. He served as a Democratic member of the Hawaii House of Representatives representing District 49 from 2004 to 2012. He was the majority leader from 2011 to 2012.

In the 2012 election, Democratic Representative Jessica Wooley (District 47) defeated Chong (District 49) for the Democratic nomination in District 48.

In 2017, Chong left the Chamber of Commerce of Hawaii to join the Hawaii Medical Service Association. Chong now works as a lobbyist at Pono Consulting LLC.
