= Henry Aquino =

American politician (born 1977)

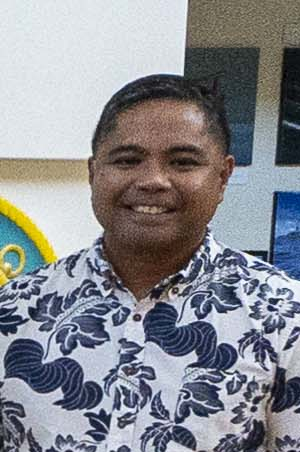
- Aquino in 2023

Member of the Hawaii Senate from the 19th district
- In office November 8, 2022 – November 30, 2025
- Preceded by: Clarence Nishihara
- Succeeded by: Rachele Lamosao

Member of the Hawaii House of Representatives 35th (2008–2012) 38th (2012-2022)
- In office November 4, 2008 – November 8, 2022
- Preceded by: Alex Sonson
- Succeeded by: Rachele Lamosao (redistricting)

Personal details
- Born: May 26, 1977 (age 49) Honolulu, Hawaii, U.S.
- Party: Democratic
- Education: Honolulu Community College; University of Hawaiʻi at West Oʻahu; Hawaii Pacific University

Henry James C. Aquino (born May 27, 1977) is an American politician who served as a Democratic member of the Hawaii State Senate for District 19 from 2022 to 2025. Previously, Aquino consecutively served in the Hawaii House of Representatives for 14 years, from 2008 until 2012 in the District 35 seat and from 2012 to 2022 in the District 38 seat. In September 2025, he announced his resignation effective November 30 to take a private sector role.

== Education ==
Aquino earned his Associate degree from Honolulu Community College, in Bachelor of Arts in public administration from the University of Hawaiʻi at West Oʻahu, and his Master's degree in communication from Hawaii Pacific University.

== Elections ==
- 2012 Redistricted to District 38, and with Democratic Representative Marilyn Lee redistricted to District 36, Aquino was unopposed for both the August 11, 2012 Democratic Primary, winning with 3,371 votes, and the November 6, 2012 General election.
- 2004 Aquino initially challenged incumbent Democratic Representative Alex Sonson in the District 35 September 18, 2004 Democratic Primary, but lost; Sonson held the seat until 2009.
- 2008 When Democratic Representative Alex Sonson ran for Hawaii Senate and left the District 35 seat open, Aquino won the five-way September 20, 2008 Democratic Primary with 2,559 votes (58.6%), and won the November 4, 2008 General election with 5,566 votes (80.7%) against Republican nominee Steven Antonio.
- 2010 Aquino won the September 18, 2010 Democratic Primary with 2,901 votes (74.5%), and won the November 2, 2010 General election with 4,803 votes (80.5%) against Republican nominee Reginald Yago.
