= George Fontaine =

American politician (born 1960)

Member of the Hawaii House of Representatives from the 11th District
- In office 2010–2012
- Succeeded by: Kaniela Ing

Personal details
- Born: September 28, 1960 (age 66)
- Party: Republican
- Education: University of Hawaiʻi Maui College

George Fontaine (born September 28, 1960) is an American politician from the Republican Party of Hawaii. Fontaine, a former police officer, served in the Hawaii House of Representatives from 2010 to 2012.

== Career ==
Fontaine began his career in 1980 as a police officer in Maui, working for the Maui Police Department until 2005. During this time he also founded an internet service provider called Maui Gateway, which was one of the first providers on the island.

Fontaine unsuccessfully ran as a Republican for the Hawaii House of Representatives in 2008, losing to incumbent Joe Bertram with 38% of the vote. He ran again in 2010 and won with 49% of the vote, representing the 11th District. During the campaign he expressed support for the legalization of medical marijuana, the expansion of charter schools, and the privatization of the Hawaii Superferry. While in the House, he secured funding for improving Mākena's emergency sirens. In 2012, he co-sponsored a bill with Roz Baker that streamlined the process for Hawaii teachers to purchase classroom supplies.

In 2012, Bretram attempted to run against Fontaine but lost in the Democratic primary. Fontaine instead faced Kaniela Ing, who won with 60% of the vote.

== Personal life ==
Fontaine is married and has two children. He is Catholic. Fontaine is an active member of Rotary International and served as the Hawaii district's governor for one term, from 2007 to 2008. While serving in the House of Representatives, he hosted a public-access television show called "The Fontaine Factor."
