= Mele Carroll =

American politician

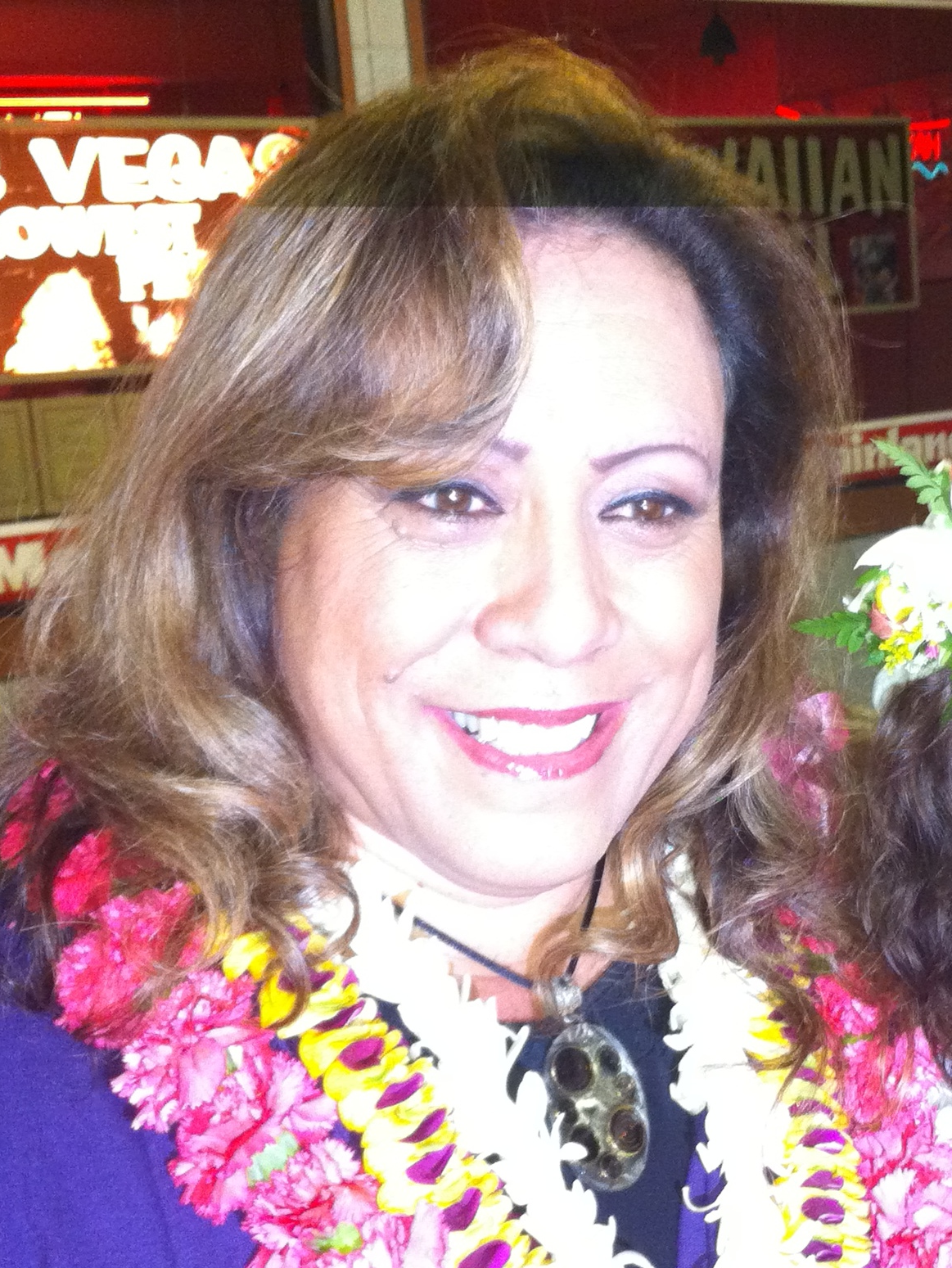
- Carroll in 2011

Member of the Hawaii House of Representatives from the 13th district
- In office February 4, 2005 – February 1, 2015
- Appointed by: Linda Lingle
- Preceded by: Sol Kahoohalahala
- Succeeded by: Lynn DeCoite

Personal details
- Born: May 9, 1964 Oahu, Hawaii
- Died: February 18, 2015 (aged 50)
- Party: Democratic
- Education: Hawaiʻi Community College; University of Hawaiʻi at Mānoa

Diana Melehaulani Soares "Mele" Carroll (May 9, 1964 – February 18, 2015) was an American politician from Oahu, Hawaii, and a Democratic member of the Hawaii House of Representatives from February 4, 2005, to February 1, 2015, representing District 13. Carroll was initially appointed by Governor Linda Lingle to the vacancy caused by the resignation of Sol Kahoohalahala. On February 1, 2015, Carroll resigned from the Hawaii Legislature due to complications from cancer treatment. On February 18, 2015, Carroll died of cancer.

== Education ==
Carroll attended Hawaiʻi Community College and the University of Hawaiʻi at Mānoa.

== Elections ==
- 2006 Carroll was unopposed for the September 26, 2006 Democratic Primary, winning with 3,081 votes, and won the November 7, 2006 General election with 4,717 votes (69.0%) against Republican nominee Ron Davis.
- 2008 Carroll was unopposed for both the September 20, 2008 Democratic Primary, winning with 1,898 votes, and the November 4, 2008 General election.
- 2010 Carroll was unopposed for the September 18, 2010 Democratic Primary, winning with 3,049 votes, and won the November 2, 2010 General election with 5,058 votes (71.2%) against Republican nominee Meiling Akuna, who had sought the seat in 2004.
- 2012 Carroll was unopposed for the August 11, 2012 Democratic Primary, winning with 2,683 votes, and won the November 6, 2012 General election with 5,787 votes (67.9%) against Republican nominee Simon Russell.
