= Ty Cullen =

American politician (born 1980/81)

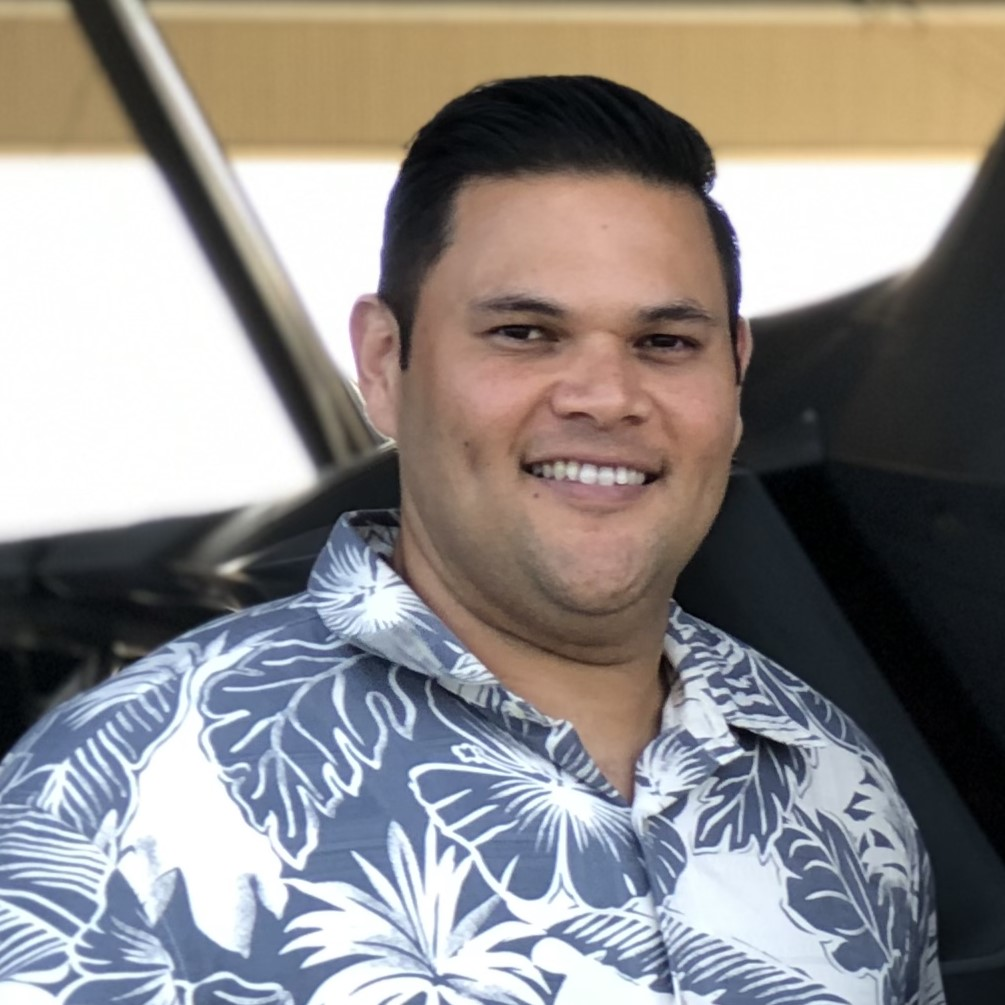
- Cullen in 2018

Member of the Hawaii House of Representatives
- In office November 2010 – February 8, 2022
- Preceded by: Jon Karamatsu
- Succeeded by: Luella Costales
- Constituency: 41st district (2010–2012); 39th district (2012–2022)

Personal details
- Born: 1980 or 1981 (age 45–46)
- Party: Democratic
- Education: University of Hawaii at Manoa

Ty J.K. Cullen is an American politician and a former Democratic member of the Hawaii State House of Representatives who represented District 39 from January 16, 2013 until his resignation on February 8, 2022. Cullen served in the District 41 seat from 2011 to 2013.

== Education ==
Cullen earned a BA in sociology and political science and a MPA from the University of Hawaii at Manoa.

== Elections ==
In 2008, Cullen initially challenged incumbent Democratic Representative Jon Karamatsu for the District 41 seat in the 2008 Democratic primary, but lost. When Karamatsu ran for Lieutenant Governor of Hawaii and left the District 41 seat open in 2010, Cullen won the four-way 2010 Democratic primary with 1,658 votes (43.1%), and won the 2010 general election with 4,510 votes (69.6%) against Republican nominee Carl Wong.

Redistricting in 2012 meant that Cullen was redistricted to District 39, where Representative Marcus Oshiro was redistricted to District 46. Cullen and Carl Wong, his Republican challenger from 2010, were both unopposed for their 2012 primaries for Oshiro's former seat. Cullen won the 2012 general election with 5,272 votes (70.3%) against Wong.

== Resignation ==
On February 8, 2022, the United States Attorney's District of Hawaii office, on behalf of the U.S. Department of Justice, filed an information charging Cullen and former Hawaii State Senate Majority Leader J. Kalani English with honest services fraud. Cullen allegedly received more than $23,000 worth of bribes to quash cesspool-related legislation. He resigned on the same day that charges were announced. Cullen pled guilty to the charge, and was sentenced to 2 years in prison and fined $25,000.
