= Richard Fale =

American politician

Member of the Hawaii House of Representatives from the 47th district
- In office November 2012 – November 2014
- Preceded by: Redistricted
- Succeeded by: Feki Pouha

Personal details
- Born: March 27, 1981 (age 45) Provo, Utah, U.S.
- Party: Republican
- Education: Windward Community College; University of Hawaii at Manoa
- Website: richardfale.com

Richard Lee Fale (born March 27, 1981, in Provo, Utah) is an American politician and a Republican member of the Hawaii House of Representatives from 2012 to 2014 representing District 47.

== Elections ==
- 2013 Representative Richard Fale voted against SB 1, which legalized same-sex marriage in Hawaii, during the special legislative fall 2013 session that ended in November.
- 2012 With Democratic Representative Jessica Wooley redistricted to District 48, Fale challenged incumbent Republican Representative Gil Riviere, who had been redistricted from District 46. Fale won the District 47 August 11, 2012 Republican Primary with 727 votes (50.5%) against Riviere, and won the November 6, 2012 General election with 4,381 votes (54.0%) against Democratic nominee D. Ululani Beirne. who had been redistricted from District 38.
- 2008 Fale initially challenged incumbent Democratic Senator Clayton Hee in the Hawaii Senate District 23, was unopposed for the September 20, 2008 Republican Primary, winning with 1,133 votes, but lost the November 4, 2008 General election to Hee.
- 2010 Fale challenged incumbent Democratic Representative Jessica Wooley in House District 47, was unopposed for the September 18, 2010 Republican Primary, winning with 895 votes, but lost the November 2, 2010 General election to Wooley.
