= Marilyn Lee =

American politician (born 1940)

Member of the Hawaii House of Representatives from the 38th district
- In office 1996–2012
- Preceded by: Sam Lee
- Succeeded by: Lauren Matsumoto

Personal details
- Born: January 15, 1940 (age 86)
- Party: Democratic
- Spouse: Sam Lee
- Education: Syracuse University

Marilyn Lee (born January 15, 1940) is an American politician from Hawaii. She served as a Democratic member of the Hawaii House of Representatives who represented District 38 from 1996 to 2012.

In the 2022 election, Lee stood in District 38 but was defeated by Republican Lauren Matsumoto.

She first ran for the seat that opened when her husband, former representative Sam Lee, decided not to run after 10 years in office.
