= Pohai Ryan =

American politician

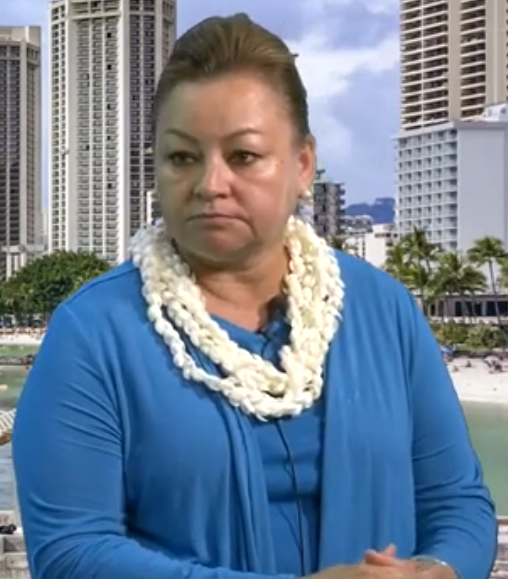
- In a 2018 interview

Member of the Hawaii State Senate
- In office 2010–2012
- Constituency: District 25

Personal details
- Party: Democratic

Pohai Ryan is an American politician who served in the Hawaii State Senate. Ryan previously worked in the tourism industry.

In 2018, she was a candidate for an at-large position on the Office of Hawaiian Affairs Board of Trustees. Ryan endorsed the Joe Biden 2020 presidential campaign.
