= 2024 Hawaii House of Representatives election =

- November 5, 2024

All 51 seats in the Hawaii House of Representatives 26 seats needed for a majority
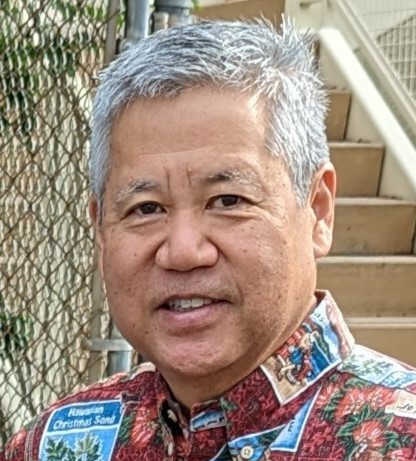

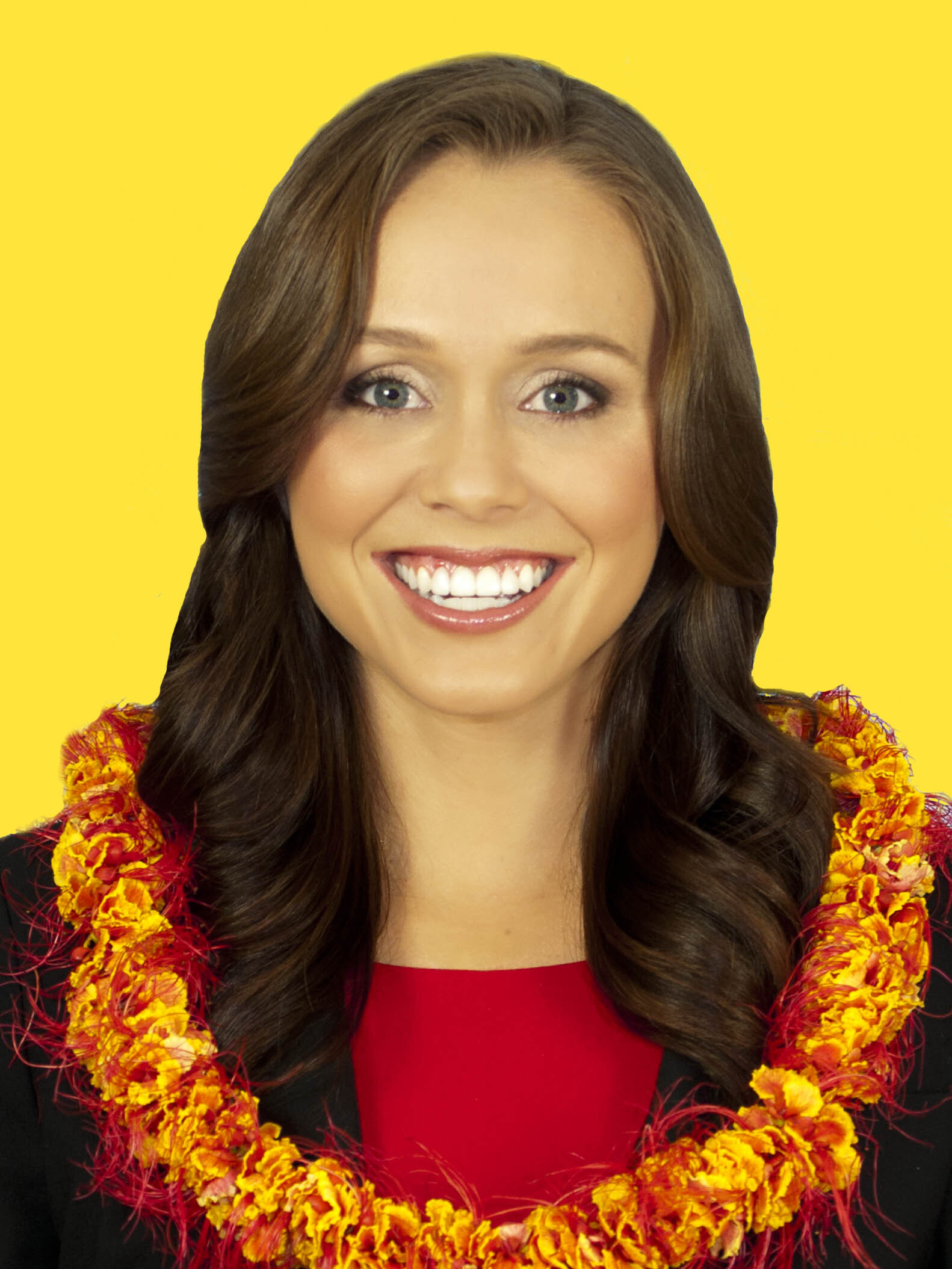
	Majority party	Minority party
Leader	Scott Saiki (lost renomination)	Lauren Cheape Matsumoto
Party	Democratic	Republican
Leader's seat	25th	38th
Last election	45	6
Seats before	45	6
Seats won	42	9
Seat change	▼3	▲3
- Results: Republican gain Republican hold Democratic hold
Speaker before election
Scott Saiki
Democratic
Elected Speaker
Nadine Nakamura
Democratic

The 2024 Hawaii House of Representatives election was held on November 5, 2024, as part of the 2024 United States elections. All 51 seats in the Hawaii House of Representatives were elected.

== Background ==
The deadline to file for candidacy was June 4, 2024. Primary elections were scheduled for August 10, 2024.

== Retirements ==
Four incumbents did not seek re-election.

=== Democrats ===
1. District 2: Richard Onishi retired.
2. District 20: Bertrand Kobayashi retired.
3. District 23: Scott Nishimoto retired to run for Honolulu City Council.
4. District 45: Cedric Gates retired to run for State Senate.

In addition, on July 11, 2024, Mark Nakashima unexpectedly died, leaving the District 1 seat vacant. His appointed successor, Matthias Kusch, was not on the general election ballot leading to Nakashima being posthumously re-elected and the seat becoming vacant again.

== Incumbents defeated ==
=== In primary election ===
Four incumbent representatives, all Democrats, were defeated in the August 10 primary election.

==== Democrats ====
1. District 25: Scott Saiki lost renomination to Kim Coco Iwamoto.
2. District 29: May Mizuno lost nomination to a full term to Ikaika Hussey.
3. District 30: Sonny Ganaden lost renomination to Shirley Ann Templo.
4. District 50: Natalia Hussey-Burdick lost renomination to Michael Lee.

=== In general election ===
2 incumbent representatives, both Democrats, were defeated by Republicans in the general election. In addition, an open seat held by Democrats flipped to Republicans.

==== Democrats ====
1. District 32: Micah Aiu was defeated by Republican Garner Shimizu.
2. District 40: Rose Martinez was defeated by Republican Julie Reyes Oda.

==== Open seats parties flipped ====
1. District 45: Open seat held by Democrat Cedric Gates was won by Republican Chris Muraoka.

== Predictions ==
Source	Ranking	As of
CNalysis	Solid D	June 13, 2024

== Results ==
=== By district ===
†: incumbent did not seek re-election.

District	Incumbent	Party	Elected representative	Party
1	Matthias Kusch (Note: Appointed September 12, 2024 following Mark Nakashima's death.)	Dem	Vacant (Note: No opposition filed in the primary or general election, leading to Mark Nakashima being posthumously re-elected.)	
2	Richard Onishi†	Dem	Sue Lee Loy (Note: Without opposition, the general election was canceled.)	Dem
3	Chris Toshiro Todd	Dem	Chris Toshiro Todd	Dem
4	Greggor Ilagan	Dem	Greggor Ilagan	Dem
5	Jeanné Kapela	Dem	Jeanné Kapela	Dem
6	Kirstin Kahaloa	Dem	Kirstin Kahaloa	Dem
7	Nicole Lowen	Dem	Nicole Lowen	Dem
8	David Tarnas	Dem	David Tarnas	Dem
9	Justin Woodson	Dem	Justin Woodson	Dem
10	Tyson Miyake (Note: Appointed December 15, 2023 following Troy Hashimoto's resignation.)	Dem	Tyson Miyake	Dem
11	Terez Amato	Dem	Terez Amato	Dem
12	Kyle Yamashita	Dem	Kyle Yamashita	Dem
13	Mahina Poepoe	Dem	Mahina Poepoe	Dem
14	Elle Cochran	Dem	Elle Cochran	Dem
15	Nadine Nakamura	Dem	Nadine Nakamura	Dem
16	Luke Evslin (Note: Appointed February 21, 2023 following James Tokioka's resignation.)	Dem	Luke Evslin	Dem
17	Dee Morikawa	Dem	Dee Morikawa	Dem
18	Gene Ward	Rep	Gene Ward	Rep
19	Mark Hashem	Dem	Mark Hashem	Dem
20	Bertrand Kobayashi†	Dem	Tina Nakada Grandinetti	Dem
21	Jackson Sayama	Dem	Jackson Sayama	Dem
22	Andrew Takuya Garrett	Dem	Andrew Takuya Garrett	Dem
23	Scott Nishimoto†	Dem	Ikaika Olds	Dem
24	Adrian Tam	Dem	Adrian Tam	Dem
25	Scott Saiki (Note: Lost renomination in the primary election.)	Dem	Kim Coco Iwamoto	Dem
26	Della Au Belatti	Dem	Della Au Belatti	Dem
27	Jenna Takenouchi	Dem	Jenna Takenouchi	Dem
28	Daniel Holt	Dem	Daniel Holt	Dem
29	May Mizuno	Dem	Ikaika Hussey	Dem
30	Sonny Ganaden	Dem	Shirley Ann Templo	Dem
31	Linda Ichiyama	Dem	Linda Ichiyama	Dem
32	Micah Aiu	Dem	Garner Shimizu	Rep
33	Sam Satoru Kong	Dem	Sam Satoru Kong	Dem
34	Gregg Takayama	Dem	Gregg Takayama	Dem
35	Cory Chun	Dem	Cory Chun	Dem
36	Rachele Lamosao	Dem	Rachele Lamosao	Dem
37	Trish La Chica (Note: Appointed February 15, 2023 following Ryan Yamane's resignation.)	Dem	Trish La Chica	Dem
38	Lauren Matsumoto	Rep	Lauren Matsumoto	Rep
39	Elijah Pierick	Rep	Elijah Pierick	Rep
40	Rose Martinez	Dem	Julie Reyes Oda	Rep
41	David Alcos	Rep	David Alcos	Rep
42	Diamond Garcia	Rep	Diamond Garcia	Rep
43	Kanani Souza	Rep	Kanani Souza	Rep
44	Darius Kila	Dem	Darius Kila	Dem
45	Cedric Gates†	Dem	Chris Muraoka	Rep
46	Amy Perruso	Dem	Amy Perruso	Dem
47	Sean Quinlan	Dem	Sean Quinlan	Dem
48	Lisa Kitagawa	Dem	Lisa Kitagawa	Dem
49	Scot Matayoshi	Dem	Scot Matayoshi	Dem
50	Natalia Hussey-Burdick	Dem	Mike Lee	Dem
51	Lisa Marten	Dem	Lisa Marten	Dem

=== Overall ===
Summary of the November 5, 2024 Hawaii House of Representatives election results
Party	Candidates	Votes		Seats		
Party	Candidates	#	%	Seats		
Party	Candidates	#	%	Before	Won	+/–
Democratic	49	210,784	63.14	45	42	▼3
Republican	36	119,556	35.81	6	9	▲3
Green	2	2,632	0.78	0	0	Steady
Libertarian	2	576	0.17	0	0	Steady
We The People	1	253	0.07	0	0	Steady
Total valid votes			%			
Blank votes			%			
Overvotes			%			
Total votes cast			100%			
Source: State of Hawaii Office of Elections

=== Closest races ===
Seats where the margin of victory was under 10%:

1. District 39, 0.2%
2. District 32, 0.8% (gain)
3. District 45, 3.2% (gain)
4. District 40, 5.4% (gain)

== Detailed results ==
General election results:

=== District 3 ===
Hawaii House of Representatives District 3 general election, 2024
Party	Candidate	Votes	%
Democratic	Chris Toshiro Todd (incumbent)	5,806	61.0
Republican	Kanoa Wilson	2,791	29.3
Libertarian	Austin Martin	276	2.9
	Blank votes	629	6.6
	Over votes	10	0.01
Total votes		9,512	100%
Democratic hold			

=== District 4 ===
Hawaii House of Representatives District 4 general election, 2024
Party	Candidate	Votes	%
Democratic	Greggor Ilagan (incumbent)	6,563	66.2
Republican	Keikilani Ho	2,824	28.5
	Blank votes	513	5.2
	Over votes	10	0.01
Total votes		9,910	100%
Democratic hold			

=== District 5 ===
Hawaii House of Representatives District 5 general election, 2024
Party	Candidate	Votes	%
Democratic	Jeanné Kapela (incumbent)	5,728	56
Republican	Ashley Oyama	3,458	33.8
Libertarian	Frederick Fogel	300	2.9
	Blank votes	727	7.1
	Over votes	16	0.02
Total votes		10,229	100%
Democratic hold			

=== District 6 ===
Hawaii House of Representatives District 6 general election, 2024
Party	Candidate	Votes	%
Democratic	Kirstin Kahaloa (incumbent)	6,217	55.40
Republican	Sylvie Madison	3,883	34.60
	Blank votes	1,121	10.00
	Over votes	5	0.00
Total votes		11,226	100%
Democratic hold			

=== District 7 ===
Hawaii House of Representatives District 7 general election, 2024
Party	Candidate	Votes	%
Democratic	Nicole Lowen (incumbent)	4,913	52.2
Republican	Timothy Dalhouse	3,943	41.9
	Blank votes	547	5.8
	Over votes	6	0.1
Total votes		9,409	100%
Democratic hold			

=== District 8 ===
Hawaii House of Representatives District 8 general election, 2024
Party	Candidate	Votes	%
Democratic	David Tarnas (incumbent)	6,324	59.4
Republican	Monique Cobb-Adams Perreira	3,816	35.8
	Blank votes	504	4.7
	Over votes	8	0.1
Total votes		10,652	100%
Democratic hold			

=== District 11 ===
Hawaii House of Representatives District 11 general election, 2024
Party	Candidate	Votes	%
Democratic	Terez Amato (incumbent)	6,618	57.4
Republican	Aileen Acain	3,506	30.4
	Blank votes	1,250	10.8
	Over votes	150	1.3
Total votes		11,524	100%
Democratic hold			

=== District 12 ===
Hawaii House of Representatives District 12 general election, 2024
Party	Candidate	Votes	%
Democratic	Kyle Yamashita (incumbent)	7,765	59.6
Republican	Dan Johnson	3,179	24.4
Green	Rita Ryan	840	6.4
	Blank votes	1,196	9.2
	Over votes	46	0.4
Total votes		11,830	100%
Democratic hold			

=== District 13 ===
Hawaii House of Representatives District 13 general election, 2024
Party	Candidate	Votes	%
Democratic	Mahina Poepoe (incumbent)	7,174	65.6%
Republican	Scott Adam	2,577	23.6%
	Blank votes	1,170	10.7%
	Over votes	16	0.1%
Total votes		9,767	100%
Democratic hold			

=== District 14 ===
Hawaii House of Representatives District 14 general election, 2024
Party	Candidate	Votes	%
Democratic	Elle Cochran (incumbent)	4,303	51.5%
Republican	Kelly Armstrong	3,338	39.9%
	Blank votes	711	8.5%
	Over votes	8	0.1%
Total votes		7,649	100%
Democratic hold			

=== District 15 ===
Hawaii House of Representatives District 15 general election, 2024
Party	Candidate	Votes	%
Democratic	Nadine Nakamura (incumbent)	6,656	64.7%
Republican	David Moranz	2,692	26.2%
	Blank votes	933	9.1%
	Over votes	7	0.1%
Total votes		9,355	100%
Democratic hold			

=== District 16 ===
Hawaii House of Representatives District 16 general election, 2024
Party	Candidate	Votes	%
Democratic	Luke Evslin (incumbent)	6,479	63.7%
Republican	Steve Yoder	2,848	28.0%
	Blank votes	842	8.3%
	Over votes	6	0.1%
Total votes		9,333	100%
Democratic hold			

=== District 17 ===
Hawaii House of Representatives District 17 general election, 2024
Party	Candidate	Votes	%
Democratic	Dee Morikawa (incumbent)	6,450	63.8%
Republican	Michael Jauch	2,638	26.1%
	Blank votes	1,010	10.0%
	Over votes	5	0.1%
Total votes		9,093	100%
Democratic hold			

=== District 20 ===
Hawaii House of Representatives District 20 general election, 2024
Party	Candidate	Votes	%
Democratic	Tina Nakada Grandinetti	7,556	63.2%
Republican	Corinne Solomon	3,362	28.1%
	Blank votes	1,033	8.6%
	Over votes	8	0.1%
Total votes		10,926	100%
Democratic hold			

=== District 21 ===
Hawaii House of Representatives District 21 general election, 2024
Party	Candidate	Votes	%
Democratic	Jackson Sayama (incumbent)	8,129	71.5%
Republican	Joelle Seashell	2,491	21.9%
	Blank votes	747	6.6%
	Over votes	8	0.1%
Total votes		10,628	100%
Democratic hold			

=== District 22 ===
Hawaii House of Representatives District 22 general election, 2024
Party	Candidate	Votes	%
Democratic	Andrew Takuya Garrett (incumbent)	8,427	72.3%
Republican	Jeffrey Imamura	2,272	19.5%
	Blank votes	950	8.1%
	Over votes	8	0.1%
Total votes		10,707	100%
Democratic hold			

=== District 24 ===
Hawaii House of Representatives District 17 general election, 2024
Party	Candidate	Votes	%
Democratic	Adrian Tam (incumbent)	5,973	62.5%
Republican	Jillian Anderson	2,862	30.0%
	Blank votes	711	7.4%
	Over votes	9	0.1%
Total votes		8,844	100%
Democratic hold			

=== District 27 ===
Hawaii House of Representatives District 27 general election, 2024
Party	Candidate	Votes	%
Democratic	Jenna Takenouchi (incumbent)	7,928	66.3%
Republican	Margaret U. Lim	3,501	29.3%
	Blank votes	513	4.3%
	Over votes	10	0.1%
Total votes		11,439	100%
Democratic hold			

=== District 29 ===
Hawaii House of Representatives District 30 general election, 2024
Party	Candidate	Votes	%
Democratic	Ikaika Hussey	4,068	64.5%
Republican	Carole Kaapu	1,944	30.8%
	Blank votes	285	4.5%
	Over votes	6	0.1%
Total votes		6,018	100%
Democratic hold			

=== District 30 ===
Hawaii House of Representatives District 30 general election, 2024
Party	Candidate	Votes	%
Democratic	Shirley Ann Templo	3,397	64.8%
Republican	P.M. Azinga	1,515	28.9%
	Blank votes	329	6.3%
	Over votes	2	0.1%
Total votes		4,914	100%
Democratic hold			

=== District 31 ===
Hawaii House of Representatives District 31 general election, 2024
Party	Candidate	Votes	%
Democratic	Linda Ichiyama (incumbent)	5,579	65.7%
Republican	Nancy Valdez	2,505	29.5%
	Blank votes	402	4.7%
	Over votes	5	0.1%
Total votes		8,089	100%
Democratic hold			

=== District 32 ===
Hawaii House of Representatives District 32 general election, 2024
Party	Candidate	Votes	%
Republican	Garner Shimizu	4,588	47.5
Democratic	Micah Aiu (incumbent)	4,512	46.7
	Blank votes	549	5.7
	Over votes	10	0.1
Total votes		9,659	100%
Republican gain from Democratic			

=== District 34 ===
Hawaii House of Representatives District 34 general election, 2024
Party	Candidate	Votes	%
Democratic	Gregg Takayama (incumbent)	6,840	64.4%
Republican	Gaius Dupio II	3,161	29.8%
	Blank votes	617	0.1%
	Over votes	4	0.0%
Total votes		10,622	100%
Democratic hold			

=== District 37 ===
Hawaii House of Representatives District 37 general election, 2024
Party	Candidate	Votes	%
Democratic	Trish La Chica (incumbent)	8,770	63.0%
Republican	Taylor Kaaumoana	4,066	29.2%
	Blank votes	1,073	7.7%
	Over votes	12	0.1%
Total votes		12,848	100%
Democratic hold			

=== District 38 ===
Hawaii House of Representatives District 38 general election, 2024
Party	Candidate	Votes	%
Republican	Lauren Cheape Matsumoto (incumbent)	8,776	68.7%
Democratic	Alexander Ozawa	3,418	26.8%
	Blank votes	566	4.4%
	Over votes	15	0.1%
Total votes		12,209	100%
Republican hold			

=== District 39 ===
Hawaii House of Representatives District 39 general election, 2024
Party	Candidate	Votes	%
Republican	Elijah Pierick (incumbent)	4,712	47.1%
Democratic	Corey Rosenlee	4,701	46.9%
	Blank votes	587	5.9%
	Over votes	13	0.1%
Total votes		9,426	100%
Republican hold			

=== District 40 ===
Hawaii House of Representatives District 40 general election, 2024
Party	Candidate	Votes	%
Republican	Julie Reyes Oda	4,290	49.4
Democratic	Rose Martinez (incumbent)	3,828	44
We the People	Christian Ulufanua	253	2.9
	Blank votes	310	3.6
	Over votes	11	0.1
Total votes		8,692	100%
Republican gain from Democratic			

=== District 41 ===
Hawaii House of Representatives District 41 general election, 2024
Party	Candidate	Votes	%
Republican	David Alcos (incumbent)	5,474	55.9%
Democratic	John Clark	3,840	39.2%
	Blank votes	474	4.8%
	Over votes	11	0.1%
Total votes		9,325	100%
Republican hold			

=== District 42 ===
Hawaii House of Representatives District 42 general election, 2024
Party	Candidate	Votes	%
Republican	Diamond Garcia (incumbent)	4,802	54.4%
Democratic	Anthony Makana Paris	3,646	41.3%
	Blank votes	369	4.2%
	Over votes	18	0.2%
Total votes		8,466	100%
Republican hold			

=== District 45 ===
Hawaii House of Representatives District 45 general election, 2024
Party	Candidate	Votes	%
Republican	Chris Muraoka	3,117	48.4
Democratic	Desiré DeSoto	2,908	45.2
	Blank votes	405	6.3
	Over votes	6	0.1
Total votes		6,436	100%
Republican gain from Democratic			

=== District 46 ===
Hawaii House of Representatives District 46 general election, 2024
Party	Candidate	Votes	%
Democratic	Amy Perruso (incumbent)	5,432	54.5%
Republican	Daniel Michael Gabriel	3,943	39.6%
	Blank votes	586	5.9%
	Over votes	6	0.1%
Total votes		9,381	100%
Democratic hold			

=== District 47 ===
Hawaii House of Representatives District 47 general election, 2024
Party	Candidate	Votes	%
Democratic	Sean Quinlan (incumbent)	4,616	52.1%
Republican	John W. Aguirre	3,405	38.4%
	Blank votes	831	9.4%
	Over votes	4	0.1%
Total votes		8,025	100%
Democratic hold			

=== District 48 ===
Hawaii House of Representatives District 48 general election, 2024
Party	Candidate	Votes	%
Democratic	Lisa Kitagawa (incumbent)	8,578	70.9%
Green	Asheemo Daily	1,791	14.8%
	Blank votes	1,727	14.3%
	Over votes	6	0.1%
Total votes		10,375	100%
Democratic hold			

=== District 49 ===
Hawaii House of Representatives District 49 general election, 2024
Party	Candidate	Votes	%
Democratic	Scot Matayoshi (incumbent)	7,711	68.6%
Republican	Josiah Ubando	2,979	26.5%
	Blank votes	552	4.9%
	Over votes	3	0.1%
Total votes		10,693	100%
Democratic hold			

=== District 50 ===
Hawaii House of Representatives District 50 general election, 2024
Party	Candidate	Votes	%
Democratic	Mike Lee	9,791	66.6%
Republican	Timothy Connelly	4,206	28.6%
	Blank votes	682	4.6%
	Over votes	14	0.1%
Total votes		14,011	100%
Democratic hold			

== See also ==
- Elections in Hawaii
- List of Hawaii state legislatures
