= 2018 Hawaii House of Representatives election =

- November 6, 2018

All 51 seats in the Hawaii House of Representatives 26 seats needed for a majority
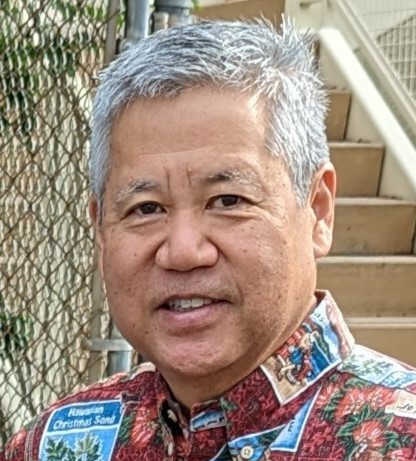

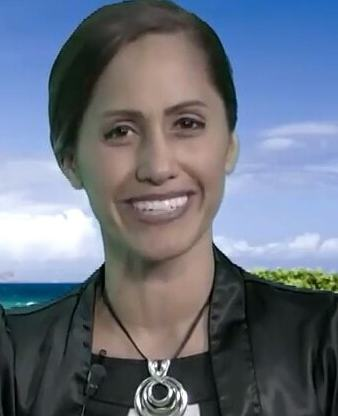
	Majority party	Minority party
Leader	Scott Saiki	Andria Tupola (retired)
Party	Democratic	Republican
Leader's seat	26th	43rd
Last election	45	6
Seats before	46	5
Seats won	46	5
Seat change	Steady	Steady
- Results: Democratic hold Democratic gain Republican hold Republican gain
Speaker before election
Scott Saiki
Democratic
Elected Speaker
Scott Saiki
Democratic

The 2018 Hawaii House of Representatives elections took place as part of the biennial United States elections. Hawaii voters elected state representatives in all 51 state house districts. State representatives serve two-year terms in the Hawaii House of Representatives.

A primary election on August 11, 2018, determined which candidates appear on the November 6 general election ballot. Primary election results can be obtained from the State of Hawaii's Office of Elections website. A statewide map of Hawaii's state house districts can be obtained from the state's Office of Planning here, and individual district maps can be obtained from the state's Office of Elections here.

Following the 2016 state house elections, Democrats maintained effective control of the chamber with 45 members. Beth Fukumoto, former Republican Leader, switched parties and was accepted into the Democratic caucus on June 19, 2017. This increased the Democrats majority to 46 seats.

To claim control of the chamber from Democrats, the Republicans would have needed to net 21 House seats. In the end, there was no net seat change, with Democrats maintaining 46 seats.

== Results ==
State House district	Incumbent	Party	Elected representative	Party
1st	Mark Nakashima	Dem	Mark Nakashima	Dem
2nd	Chris Toshiro Todd	Dem	Chris Toshiro Todd	Dem
3rd	Richard Onishi	Dem	Richard Onishi	Dem
4th	Joy San Buenaventura	Dem	Joy San Buenaventura	Dem
5th	Richard Creagan	Dem	Richard Creagan	Dem
6th	Nicole Lowen	Dem	Nicole Lowen	Dem
7th	Cindy Evans	Dem	David Tarnas	Dem
8th	Troy Hashimoto	Dem	Troy Hashimoto	Dem
9th	Justin Woodson	Dem	Justin Woodson	Dem
10th	Angus McKelvey	Dem	Angus McKelvey	Dem
11th	Kaniela Ing	Dem	Tina Wildberger	Dem
12th	Kyle Yamashita	Dem	Kyle Yamashita	Dem
13th	Lynn DeCoite	Dem	Lynn DeCoite	Dem
14th	Nadine Nakamura	Dem	Nadine Nakamura	Dem
15th	James Tokioka	Dem	James Tokioka	Dem
16th	Dee Morikawa	Dem	Dee Morikawa	Dem
17th	Gene Ward	Rep	Gene Ward	Rep
18th	Mark Hashem	Dem	Mark Hashem	Dem
19th	Bertrand Kobayashi	Dem	Bertrand Kobayashi	Dem
20th	Calvin K.Y. Say	Dem	Calvin K.Y. Say	Dem
21st	Scott Nishimoto	Dem	Scott Nishimoto	Dem
22nd	Tom Brower	Dem	Tom Brower	Dem
23rd	Isaac Choy	Dem	Dale Kobayashi	Dem
24th	Della Au Belatti	Dem	Della Au Belatti	Dem
25th	Sylvia Luke	Dem	Sylvia Luke	Dem
26th	Scott Saiki	Dem	Scott Saiki	Dem
27th	Takashi Ohno	Dem	Takashi Ohno	Dem
28th	John Mizuno	Dem	John Mizuno	Dem
29th	Daniel Holt	Dem	Daniel Holt	Dem
30th	Romy Cachola	Dem	Romy Cachola	Dem
31st	Aaron Johanson	Dem	Aaron Johanson	Dem
32nd	Linda Ichiyama	Dem	Linda Ichiyama	Dem
33rd	Sam Kong	Dem	Sam Kong	Dem
34th	Gregg Takayama	Dem	Gregg Takayama	Dem
35th	Roy Takumi	Dem	Roy Takumi	Dem
36th	Beth Fukumoto	Dem	Val Okimoto	Rep
37th	Ryan Yamane	Dem	Ryan Yamane	Dem
38th	Henry Aquino	Dem	Henry Aquino	Dem
39th	Ty Cullen	Dem	Ty Cullen	Dem
40th	Bob McDermott	Rep	Bob McDermott	Rep
41st	Matt LoPresti	Dem	Rida Cabanilla	Dem
42nd	Sharon Har	Dem	Sharon Har	Dem
43rd	Andria Tupola	Rep	Stacelynn Kehaulani Eli	Dem
44th	Cedric Gates	Dem	Cedric Gates	Dem
45th	Lauren Matsumoto	Rep	Lauren Matsumoto	Rep
46th	Lei Learmont	Dem	Amy Perruso	Dem
47th	Sean Quinlan	Dem	Sean Quinlan	Dem
48th	Jarrett Keohokalole	Dem	Lisa Kitagawa	Dem
49th	Ken Ito	Dem	Scot Matayoshi	Dem
50th	Cynthia Thielen	Rep	Cynthia Thielen	Rep
51st	Chris Lee	Dem	Chris Lee	Dem

== Predictions ==
Source	Ranking	As of
Governing	Safe D	October 8, 2018

== Detailed results ==
=== District 1 ===
Democratic primary election
Party	Candidate	Votes	%
Democratic	Mark Nakashima (incumbent)	4,413	72.1
Democratic	Koohan Paik-Mander	1,711	27.9
Total votes		6,124	100.0

- The state of Hawaii does not report vote totals for uncontested races. Incumbent Democrat Mark Nakashima was re-elected without opposition in the general election.

Hawaii's 1st House District general election, 2018
Party	Candidate	Votes	%
Democratic	Mark Nakashima (incumbent)	Unreported	100.0
Total votes		Unreported	100.0
Democratic hold			

=== District 2 ===
Republican primary election
Party	Candidate	Votes	%
Republican	Grace Manipol-Larson	217	68.7
Republican	Bryan Feste	99	31.3
Total votes		316	100.0

Democratic primary election
Party	Candidate	Votes	%
Democratic	Chris Toshiro Todd (incumbent)	4,305	73.0
Democratic	Terri Napeahi	1,592	27.0
Total votes		5,897	100.0

Hawaii's 2nd House District general election, 2018
Party	Candidate	Votes	%
Democratic	Chris Toshiro Todd (incumbent)	6,692	83.3
Republican	Grace Manipol-Larson	1,344	16.7
Total votes		8,036	100.0
Democratic hold			

=== District 3 ===
Libertarian primary election
Party	Candidate	Votes	%
Libertarian	Fred Fogel	16	100.0
Total votes		16	100.0

Democratic primary election
Party	Candidate	Votes	%
Democratic	Richard Onishi (incumbent)	2,997	55.0
Democratic	Raina Whiting	2,456	45.0
Total votes		5,453	100.0

Hawaii's 3rd House District general election, 2018
Party	Candidate	Votes	%
Democratic	Richard Onishi (incumbent)	5,795	77.6
Libertarian	Fred Fogel	1,675	22.4
Total votes		7,470	100.0
Democratic hold			

=== District 4 ===
Democratic primary election
Party	Candidate	Votes	%
Democratic	Joy San Buenaventura (incumbent)	3,919	100.0
Total votes		3,919	100.0

- The state of Hawaii does not report vote totals for uncontested races. Incumbent Democrat Joy San Buenaventura was re-elected without opposition in the general election.

Hawaii's 4th House District general election, 2018
Party	Candidate	Votes	%
Democratic	Joy San Buenaventura (incumbent)	Unreported	100.0
Total votes		Unreported	100.0
Democratic hold			

=== District 5 ===
Democratic primary election
Party	Candidate	Votes	%
Democratic	Richard Creagan (incumbent)	2,359	50.4
Democratic	Jeanne Kapela	1,872	40.0
Democratic	Gene Leslie	447	9.6
Total votes		4,678	100.0

- The state of Hawaii does not report vote totals for uncontested races. Incumbent Democrat Richard Creagan was re-elected without opposition in the general election.

Hawaii's 5th House District general election, 2018
Party	Candidate	Votes	%
Democratic	Richard Creagan (incumbent)	Unreported	100.0
Total votes		Unreported	100.0
Democratic hold			

=== District 6 ===
Democratic primary election
Party	Candidate	Votes	%
Democratic	Nicole Lowen (incumbent)	3,631	100.0
Total votes		3,631	100.0

- The state of Hawaii does not report vote totals for uncontested races. Incumbent Democrat Nicole Lowen was re-elected without opposition in the general election.

Hawaii's 8th House District general election, 2018
Party	Candidate	Votes	%
Democratic	Nicole Lowen (incumbent)	Unreported	100.0
Total votes		Unreported	100.0
Democratic hold			

=== District 7 ===
Republican primary election
Party	Candidate	Votes	%
Republican	Tom Belekanich	713	100.0
Total votes		713	100.0

Democratic primary election
Party	Candidate	Votes	%
Democratic	David Tarnas	2,904	53.7
Democratic	Cindy Evans (incumbent)	2,505	46.3
Total votes		5,409	100.0

Hawaii's 7th House District general election, 2018
Party	Candidate	Votes	%
Democratic	David Tarnas	6,584	76.9
Republican	Tom Belekanich	1,974	23.1
Total votes		8,558	100.0
Democratic hold			

=== District 8 ===
Democratic primary election
Party	Candidate	Votes	%
Democratic	Troy Hashimoto (incumbent)	3,267	53.3
Democratic	Dain Kane	2,019	33.0
Democratic	Mary Wagner	440	7.2
Democratic	Justin Hughey	398	6.5
Total votes		6,124	100.0

- The state of Hawaii does not report vote totals for uncontested races. Incumbent Democrat Troy Hashimoto was re-elected without opposition in the general election.

Hawaii's 8th House District general election, 2018
Party	Candidate	Votes	%
Democratic	Troy Hashimoto (incumbent)	Unreported	100.0
Total votes		Unreported	100.0
Democratic hold			

=== District 9 ===
Nonpartisan primary election
Party	Candidate	Votes	%
Independent	Andrew Kayes (Note: Listed on ballot as "Nonpartisan.")	28	100.0
Total votes		28	100.0

Democratic primary election
Party	Candidate	Votes	%
Democratic	Justin Woodson (incumbent)	2,683	63.4
Democratic	Kauanoe Batangan	1,549	36.6
Total votes		4,232	100.0

- Independent Andrew Kayes was denied access to the general election ballot. The state of Hawaii does not report vote totals for uncontested races. Incumbent Democrat Justin Woodson was re-elected without opposition in the general election.

Hawaii's 9th House District general election, 2018
Party	Candidate	Votes	%
Democratic	Justin Woodson (incumbent)	Unreported	100.0
Total votes		Unreported	100.0
Democratic hold			

=== District 10 ===
Democratic primary election
Party	Candidate	Votes	%
Democratic	Angus McKelvey (incumbent)	2,341	100.0
Total votes		2,341	100.0

Republican primary election
Party	Candidate	Votes	%
Republican	Chayne Marten	373	100.0
Total votes		373	100.0

Green primary election
Party	Candidate	Votes	%
Green	Jen Kamaho'i Mather	32	100.0
Total votes		32	100.0

Hawaii's 10th House District general election, 2018
Party	Candidate	Votes	%
Democratic	Angus McKelvey (incumbent)	3,729	59.7
Republican	Chayne Marten	1,346	21.5
Green	Jen Kamaho'i Mather	1,171	18.7
Total votes		6,246	100.0
Democratic hold			

=== District 11 ===
Nonpartisan primary election
Party	Candidate	Votes	%
Independent	Daniel Kanahele	62	100.0
Total votes		62	100.0

Democratic primary election
Party	Candidate	Votes	%
Democratic	Tina Wildberger	2,181	56.7
Democratic	Don Couch	1,505	39.1
Democratic	Lee Myrick	161	4.2
Total votes		3,847	100.0

- Independent Daniel Kanahele was denied access to the general election ballot. The state of Hawaii does not report vote totals for uncontested races. Democrat Tina Wildberger was elected without opposition in the general election.

Hawaii's 11th House District general election, 2018
Party	Candidate	Votes	%
Democratic	Tina Wildberger	Unreported	100.0
Total votes		Unreported	100.0
Democratic hold			

=== District 12 ===
Democratic primary election
Party	Candidate	Votes	%
Democratic	Kyle Yamashita (incumbent)	3,413	51.8
Democratic	Tiare Lawrence	3,173	48.2
Total votes		6,586	100.0

- The state of Hawaii does not report vote totals for uncontested races. Incumbent Democrat Kyle Yamashita was re-elected without opposition in the general election.

Hawaii's 12th House District general election, 2018
Party	Candidate	Votes	%
Democratic	Kyle Yamashita (incumbent)	Unreported	100.0
Total votes		Unreported	100.0
Democratic hold			

=== District 13 ===
Democratic primary election
Party	Candidate	Votes	%
Democratic	Lynn DeCoite (incumbent)	2,876	59.9
Democratic	John-Bull English	1,927	40.1
Total votes		4,803	100.0

Green primary election
Party	Candidate	Votes	%
Green	Nick Nikhilananda	25	100.0
Total votes		25	100.0

Hawaii's 13th House District general election, 2018
Party	Candidate	Votes	%
Democratic	Lynn DeCoite (incumbent)	5,796	71.6
Green	Nick Nikhilananda	2,298	28.4
Total votes		8,094	100.0
Democratic hold			

=== District 14 ===
Democratic primary election
Party	Candidate	Votes	%
Democratic	Nadine Nakamura (incumbent)	3,715	100.0
Total votes		3,715	100.0

- The state of Hawaii does not report vote totals for uncontested races. Incumbent Democrat Nadine Nakamura was re-elected without opposition in the general election.

Hawaii's 14th House District general election, 2018
Party	Candidate	Votes	%
Democratic	Nadine Nakamura (incumbent)	Unreported	100.0
Total votes		Unreported	100.0
Democratic hold			

=== District 15 ===
Democratic primary election
Party	Candidate	Votes	%
Democratic	James Tokioka (incumbent)	3,889	78.2
Democratic	Elaine Daligdig	1,085	21.8
Total votes		4,974	100.0

- The state of Hawaii does not report vote totals for uncontested races. Incumbent Democrat James Tokioka was re-elected without opposition in the general election.

Hawaii's 15th House District general election, 2018
Party	Candidate	Votes	%
Democratic	James Tokioka (incumbent)	Unreported	100.0
Total votes		Unreported	100.0
Democratic hold			

=== District 16 ===
Democratic primary election
Party	Candidate	Votes	%
Democratic	Dee Morikawa (incumbent)	3,058	62.5
Democratic	Stephanie Iona	1,835	37.5
Total votes		4,893	100.0

- The state of Hawaii does not report vote totals for uncontested races. Incumbent Democrat Dee Morikawa was re-elected without opposition in the general election.

Hawaii's 16th House District general election, 2018
Party	Candidate	Votes	%
Democratic	Dee Morikawa (incumbent)	Unreported	100.0
Total votes		Unreported	100.0
Democratic hold			

=== District 17 ===
Republican primary election
Party	Candidate	Votes	%
Republican	Gene Ward (incumbent)	973	100.0
Total votes		973	100.0

Libertarian primary election
Party	Candidate	Votes	%
Libertarian	Alan Yim	7	100.0
Total votes		7	100.0

Hawaii's 17th House District general election, 2018
Party	Candidate	Votes	%
Republican	Gene Ward (incumbent)	8,233	82.9
Libertarian	Alan Yim	1,694	17.1
Total votes		9,927	100.0
Republican hold			

=== District 18 ===
Democratic primary election
Party	Candidate	Votes	%
Democratic	Mark Hashem (incumbent)	5,368	100.0
Total votes		5,368	100.0

Republican primary election
Party	Candidate	Votes	%
Republican	Ola Souza	594	100.0
Total votes		594	100.0

Hawaii's 18th House District general election, 2018
Party	Candidate	Votes	%
Democratic	Mark Hashem (incumbent)	7,000	68.3
Republican	Ola Souza	3,255	31.7
Total votes		10,255	100.0
Democratic hold			

=== District 19 ===
Democratic primary election
Party	Candidate	Votes	%
Democratic	Bertrand Kobayashi (incumbent)	4,487	100.0
Total votes		4,487	100.0

- The state of Hawaii does not report vote totals for uncontested races. Incumbent Democrat Bertrand Kobayashi was re-elected without opposition in the general election.

Hawaii's 19th House District general election, 2018
Party	Candidate	Votes	%
Democratic	Bertrand Kobayashi (incumbent)	Unreported	100.0
Total votes		Unreported	100.0
Democratic hold			

=== District 20 ===
Republican primary election
Party	Candidate	Votes	%
Republican	Julia Allen	382	83.6
Republican	Brendan Hand	75	16.4
Total votes		457	100.0

Democratic primary election
Party	Candidate	Votes	%
Democratic	Calvin K.Y. Say (incumbent)	4,794	100.0
Total votes		4,794	100.0

Hawaii's 20th House District general election, 2018
Party	Candidate	Votes	%
Democratic	Calvin K.Y. Say (incumbent)	6,247	72.9
Republican	Julia Allen	2,322	27.1
Total votes		8,569	100.0
Democratic hold			

=== District 21 ===
Democratic primary election
Party	Candidate	Votes	%
Democratic	Scott Nishimoto (incumbent)	3,124	100.0
Total votes		3,124	100.0

- The state of Hawaii does not report vote totals for uncontested races. Incumbent Democrat Scott Nishimoto was re-elected without opposition in the general election.

Hawaii's 21st House District general election, 2018
Party	Candidate	Votes	%
Democratic	Scott Nishimoto (incumbent)	Unreported	100.0
Total votes		Unreported	100.0
Democratic hold			

=== District 22 ===
Democratic primary election
Party	Candidate	Votes	%
Democratic	Tom Brower (incumbent)	2,036	100.0
Total votes		2,036	100.0

Republican primary election
Party	Candidate	Votes	%
Republican	Kathryn Henski-Stark	449	100.0
Total votes		449	100.0

Hawaii's 22nd House District general election, 2018
Party	Candidate	Votes	%
Democratic	Tom Brower (incumbent)	3,662	66.9
Republican	Kathryn Henski-Stark	1,813	33.1
Total votes		5,475	100.0
Democratic hold			

=== District 23 ===
Democratic primary election
Party	Candidate	Votes	%
Democratic	Dale Kobayashi	2,434	42.2
Democratic	Andrew Takuya Garrett	1,531	26.5
Democratic	Dylan Armstrong	731	12.7
Democratic	Elton Fukumoto	598	10.4
Democratic	Benton Park Rodden	473	8.2
Total votes		5,767	100.0

- The state of Hawaii does not report vote totals for uncontested races. Democrat Dale Kobayashi was elected without opposition in the general election.

Hawaii's 23rd House District general election, 2018
Party	Candidate	Votes	%
Democratic	Dale Kobayashi	Unreported	100.0
Total votes		Unreported	100.0
Democratic hold			

=== District 24 ===
Democratic primary election
Party	Candidate	Votes	%
Democratic	Della Au Belatti (incumbent)	3,487	100.0
Total votes		3,487	100.0

- The state of Hawaii does not report vote totals for uncontested races. Incumbent Democrat Della Au Belatti was re-elected without opposition in the general election.

Hawaii's 24th House District general election, 2018
Party	Candidate	Votes	%
Democratic	Della Au Belatti (incumbent)	Unreported	100.0
Total votes		Unreported	100.0
Democratic hold			

=== District 25 ===
Democratic primary election
Party	Candidate	Votes	%
Democratic	Sylvia Luke (incumbent)	4,266	100.0
Total votes		4,266	100.0

- The state of Hawaii does not report vote totals for uncontested races. Incumbent Democrat Sylvia Luke was re-elected without opposition in the general election.

Hawaii's 25th House District general election, 2018
Party	Candidate	Votes	%
Democratic	Sylvia Luke (incumbent)	Unreported	100.0
Total votes		Unreported	100.0
Democratic hold			

=== District 26 ===
Democratic primary election
Party	Candidate	Votes	%
Democratic	Scott Saiki (incumbent)	3,398	100.0
Total votes		3,398	100.0

- The state of Hawaii does not report vote totals for uncontested races. Incumbent Democrat Scott Saiki was re-elected without opposition in the general election.

Hawaii's 26th House District general election, 2018
Party	Candidate	Votes	%
Democratic	Scott Saiki (incumbent)	Unreported	100.0
Total votes		Unreported	100.0
Democratic hold			

=== District 27 ===
Republican primary election
Party	Candidate	Votes	%
Republican	Mela Kealoha-Lindsey	355	100.0
Total votes		355	100.0

Democratic primary election
Party	Candidate	Votes	%
Democratic	Takashi Ohno (incumbent)	4,135	100.0
Total votes		4,135	100.0

Hawaii's 27th House District general election, 2018
Party	Candidate	Votes	%
Democratic	Takashi Ohno (incumbent)	4,949	74.4
Republican	Mela Kealoha-Lindsey	1,700	25.6
Total votes		6,649	100.0
Democratic hold			

=== District 28 ===
Democratic primary election
Party	Candidate	Votes	%
Democratic	John Mizuno (incumbent)	2,392	100.0
Total votes		2,392	100.0

- The state of Hawaii does not report vote totals for uncontested races. Incumbent Democrat John Mizuno was re-elected without opposition in the general election.

Hawaii's 28th House District general election, 2018
Party	Candidate	Votes	%
Democratic	John Mizuno (incumbent)	Unreported	100.0
Total votes		Unreported	100.0
Democratic hold			

=== District 29 ===
Democratic primary election
Party	Candidate	Votes	%
Democratic	Daniel Holt (incumbent)	1,399	68.9
Democratic	James Logue	631	31.1
Total votes		2,030	100.0

- The state of Hawaii does not report vote totals for uncontested races. Incumbent Democrat Daniel Holt was re-elected without opposition in the general election.

Hawaii's 29th House District general election, 2018
Party	Candidate	Votes	%
Democratic	Daniel Holt (incumbent)	Unreported	100.0
Total votes		Unreported	100.0
Democratic hold			

=== District 30 ===
Democratic primary election
Party	Candidate	Votes	%
Democratic	Romy Cachola (incumbent)	920	51.4
Democratic	Ernesto Ganaden	869	48.6
Total votes		1,789	100.0

Republican primary election
Party	Candidate	Votes	%
Republican	Mar Velasco	184	100.0
Total votes		184	100.0

Hawaii's 30th House District general election, 2018
Party	Candidate	Votes	%
Democratic	Romy Cachola (incumbent)	1,760	60.0
Republican	Mar Velasco	1,171	40.0
Total votes		2,931	100.0
Democratic hold			

=== District 31 ===
Democratic primary election
Party	Candidate	Votes	%
Democratic	Aaron Johanson (incumbent)	2,613	100.0
Total votes		2,613	100.0

- The state of Hawaii does not report vote totals for uncontested races. Incumbent Democrat Aaron Johanson was re-elected without opposition in the general election.

Hawaii's 31st House District general election, 2018
Party	Candidate	Votes	%
Democratic	Aaron Johanson (incumbent)	Unreported	100.0
Total votes		Unreported	100.0
Democratic hold			

=== District 32 ===
Democratic primary election
Party	Candidate	Votes	%
Democratic	Linda Ichiyama (incumbent)	3,879	100.0
Total votes		3,879	100.0

- The state of Hawaii does not report vote totals for uncontested races. Incumbent Democrat Linda Ichiyama was re-elected without opposition in the general election.

Hawaii's 32nd House District general election, 2018
Party	Candidate	Votes	%
Democratic	Linda Ichiyama (incumbent)	Unreported	100.0
Total votes		Unreported	100.0
Democratic hold			

=== District 33 ===
Democratic primary election
Party	Candidate	Votes	%
Democratic	Sam Kong (incumbent)	3,844	56.7
Democratic	Tracy Arakaki	1,922	28.4
Democratic	David Matsushita	1,013	14.9
Total votes		6,779	100.0

- The state of Hawaii does not report vote totals for uncontested races. Incumbent Democrat Sam Kong was re-elected without opposition in the general election.

Hawaii's 33rd House District general election, 2018
Party	Candidate	Votes	%
Democratic	Sam Kong (incumbent)	Unreported	100.0
Total votes		Unreported	100.0
Democratic hold			

=== District 34 ===
Democratic primary election
Party	Candidate	Votes	%
Democratic	Gregg Takayama (incumbent)	5,335	100.0
Total votes		5,335	100.0

- The state of Hawaii does not report vote totals for uncontested races. Incumbent Democrat Gregg Takayama was re-elected without opposition in the general election.

Hawaii's 34th House District general election, 2018
Party	Candidate	Votes	%
Democratic	Gregg Takayama (incumbent)	Unreported	100.0
Total votes		Unreported	100.0
Democratic hold			

=== District 35 ===
Democratic primary election
Party	Candidate	Votes	%
Democratic	Roy Takumi (incumbent)	2,974	100.0
Total votes		2,974	100.0

- The state of Hawaii does not report vote totals for uncontested races. Incumbent Democrat Roy Takumi was re-elected without opposition in the general election.

Hawaii's 35th House District general election, 2018
Party	Candidate	Votes	%
Democratic	Roy Takumi (incumbent)	Unreported	100.0
Total votes		Unreported	100.0
Democratic hold			

=== District 36 ===
Democratic primary election
Party	Candidate	Votes	%
Democratic	Marilyn Lee	2,026	35.5
Democratic	Dean Hazama	1,813	31.8
Democratic	Trish La Chica	1,381	24.2
Democratic	Zuri Aki	487	8.5
Total votes		5,707	100.0

Republican primary election
Party	Candidate	Votes	%
Republican	Val Okimoto	889	100.0
Total votes		889	100.0

Hawaii's 36th House District general election, 2018
Party	Candidate	Votes	%
Republican	Val Okimoto	4,933	54.7
Democratic	Marilyn Lee	4,081	45.3
Total votes		9,014	100.0
Republican gain from Democratic			

=== District 37 ===
Republican primary election
Party	Candidate	Votes	%
Republican	Mary Smart	749	100.0
Total votes		749	100.0

Democratic primary election
Party	Candidate	Votes	%
Democratic	Ryan Yamane (incumbent)	5,422	100.0
Total votes		5,422	100.0

Hawaii's 37th House District general election, 2018
Party	Candidate	Votes	%
Democratic	Ryan Yamane (incumbent)	6,884	71.1
Republican	Mary Smart	2,799	28.9
Total votes		9,683	100.0
Democratic hold			

=== District 38 ===
Democratic primary election
Party	Candidate	Votes	%
Democratic	Henry Aquino (incumbent)	2,549	100.0
Total votes		2,549	100.0

- The state of Hawaii does not report vote totals for uncontested races. Incumbent Democrat Henry Aquino was re-elected without opposition in the general election.

Hawaii's 38th House District general election, 2018
Party	Candidate	Votes	%
Democratic	Henry Aquino (incumbent)	Unreported	100.0
Total votes		Unreported	100.0
Democratic hold			

=== District 39 ===
Democratic primary election
Party	Candidate	Votes	%
Democratic	Ty Cullen (incumbent)	2,961	100.0
Total votes		2,961	100.0

- The state of Hawaii does not report vote totals for uncontested races. Incumbent Democrat Ty Cullen was re-elected without opposition in the general election.

Hawaii's 39th House District general election, 2018
Party	Candidate	Votes	%
Democratic	Ty Cullen (incumbent)	Unreported	100.0
Total votes		Unreported	100.0
Democratic hold			

=== District 40 ===
Nonpartisan primary election
Party	Candidate	Votes	%
Independent	Pat Cariaga Bolo	27	100.0
Total votes		27	100.0

Republican primary election
Party	Candidate	Votes	%
Republican	Bob McDermott (incumbent)	675	100.0
Total votes		675	100.0

Democratic primary election
Party	Candidate	Votes	%
Democratic	Rose Martinez	1,634	100.0
Total votes		1,634	100.0

- Independent Pat Cariaga Bolo was denied access to the general election ballot.

Hawaii's 40th House District general election, 2018
Party	Candidate	Votes	%
Republican	Bob McDermott (incumbent)	3,037	55.8
Democratic	Rose Martinez	2,406	44.2
Total votes		5,443	100.0
Republican hold			

=== District 41 ===
Republican primary election
Party	Candidate	Votes	%
Republican	Chris Fidelibus	732	100.0
Total votes		732	100.0

Democratic primary election
Party	Candidate	Votes	%
Democratic	Rida Cabanilla Arakawa	1,844	57.8
Democratic	Lynn Robinson-Onderko	1,345	42.2
Total votes		3,189	100.0

Hawaii's 41st House District general election, 2018
Party	Candidate	Votes	%
Democratic	Rida Cabanilla Arakawa	4,007	53.8
Republican	Chris Fidelibus	3,440	46.2
Total votes		7,447	100.0
Democratic hold			

=== District 42 ===
Democratic primary election
Party	Candidate	Votes	%
Democratic	Sharon Har (incumbent)	3,018	78.5
Democratic	Jake Schafer	826	21.5
Total votes		3,844	100.0

- The state of Hawaii does not report vote totals for uncontested races. Incumbent Democrat Sharon Har was re-elected without opposition in the general election.

Hawaii's 42nd House District general election, 2018
Party	Candidate	Votes	%
Democratic	Sharon Har (incumbent)	Unreported	100.0
Total votes		Unreported	100.0
Democratic hold			

=== District 43 ===
- Republican Sailau Timoteo, originally from American Samoa, was disqualified from running for the office because she is a U.S. National, not a U.S. citizen.

Democratic primary election
Party	Candidate	Votes	%
Democratic	Stacelynn Kehaulani Eli	1,914	89.4
Democratic	Michael Jesus Juarez	228	10.6
Total votes		2,142	100.0

Nonpartisan primary election
Party	Candidate	Votes	%
Independent	Angela S. (Aulani) Kaaihue	18	100.0
Total votes		18	100.0

Republican primary election
Party	Candidate	Votes	%
Republican	Sailau Timoteo (disqualified)	766	100.0
Total votes		766	100.0

- Independent Angela S. (Aulani) Kaaihue was denied access to the general election ballot. The state of Hawaii does not report vote totals for uncontested races. Democrat Stacelynn Kehaulani Eli was elected without opposition in the general election. This was a Democratic flip of a Republican seat.

Hawaii's 43rd House District general election, 2018
Party	Candidate	Votes	%
Democratic	Stacelynn Kehaulani Eli	Unreported	100.0
Total votes		Unreported	100.0
Democratic gain from Republican			

=== District 44 ===
Democratic primary election
Party	Candidate	Votes	%
Democratic	Cedric Gates (incumbent)	1,770	69.5
Democratic	Jo Jordan	777	30.5
Total votes		2,547	100.0

- The state of Hawaii does not report vote totals for uncontested races. Incumbent Democrat Cedric Gates was re-elected without opposition in the general election.

Hawaii's 44th House District general election, 2018
Party	Candidate	Votes	%
Democratic	Cedric Gates (incumbent)	Unreported	100.0
Total votes		Unreported	100.0
Democratic hold			

=== District 45 ===
Republican primary election
Party	Candidate	Votes	%
Republican	Lauren Cheape Matsumoto (incumbent)	455	100.0
Total votes		455	100.0

- The state of Hawaii does not report vote totals for uncontested races. Incumbent Republican Lauren Matsumoto was re-elected without opposition in the general election.

Hawaii's 45th House District general election, 2018
Party	Candidate	Votes	%
Republican	Lauren Cheape Matsumoto (incumbent)	Unreported	100.0
Total votes		Unreported	100.0
Republican hold			

=== District 46 ===
Republican primary election
Party	Candidate	Votes	%
Republican	John Miller	461	100.0
Total votes		461	100.0

Democratic primary election
Party	Candidate	Votes	%
Democratic	Amy Perruso	1,429	51.6
Democratic	Lei Learmont (incumbent)	1,221	44.0
Democratic	Lester Fung	122	4.4
Total votes		2,772	100.0

Hawaii's 46th House District general election, 2018
Party	Candidate	Votes	%
Democratic	Amy Perruso	3,205	66.15
Republican	John Miller	1,640	33.85
Total votes		4,845	100.0
Democratic hold			

=== District 47 ===
Republican primary election
Party	Candidate	Votes	%
Republican	Richard Lee Fale	644	58.6
Republican	Boyd Ready	455	41.4
Total votes		1,099	100.0

Democratic primary election
Party	Candidate	Votes	%
Democratic	Sean Quinlan (incumbent)	2,314	100.0
Total votes		2,314	100.0

Hawaii's 47th House District general election, 2018
Party	Candidate	Votes	%
Democratic	Sean Quinlan (incumbent)	3,792	58.5
Republican	Richard Lee Fale	2,690	41.5
Total votes		6,482	100.0
Democratic hold			

=== District 48 ===
Democratic primary election
Party	Candidate	Votes	%
Democratic	Lisa Kitagawa	2,596	39.4
Democratic	Jessica Wooley	1,927	29.2
Democratic	Kika Bukoski	1,415	21.4
Democratic	Randy Gonce	659	10.0
Total votes		6,597	100.0

- The state of Hawaii does not report vote totals for uncontested races. Democrat Lisa Kitagawa was elected without opposition in the general election.

Hawaii's 48th House District general election, 2018
Party	Candidate	Votes	%
Democratic	Lisa Kitagawa	Unreported	100.0
Total votes		Unreported	100.0
Democratic hold			

=== District 49 ===
Nonpartisan primary election
Party	Candidate	Votes	%
Independent	Adriel Lam	51	100.0
Total votes		51	100.0

Democratic primary election
Party	Candidate	Votes	%
Democratic	Scot Matayoshi	5,336	72.4
Democratic	Natalia Hussey-Burdick	1,393	18.9
Democratic	Kaui Dalire	324	4.4
Democratic	Mo Radke	313	4.2
Total votes		7,366	100.0

- Independent Adriel Lam was denied access to the general election ballot. The state of Hawaii does not report vote totals for uncontested races. Democrat Scot Matayoshi was elected without opposition in the general election.

Hawaii's 49th House District general election, 2018
Party	Candidate	Votes	%
Democratic	Scot Matayoshi	Unreported	100.0
Total votes		Unreported	100.0
Democratic hold			

=== District 50 ===
Democratic primary election
Party	Candidate	Votes	%
Democratic	Micah Kalama Pregitzer	2,646	67.0
Democratic	Miles Shiratori	1,301	33.0
Total votes		3,947	100.0

Republican primary election
Party	Candidate	Votes	%
Republican	Cynthia Thielen (incumbent)	736	100.0
Total votes		736	100.0

Hawaii's 50th House District general election, 2018
Party	Candidate	Votes	%
Republican	Cynthia Thielen (incumbent)	5,406	62.1
Democratic	Micah Kalama Pregitzer	3,298	37.9
Total votes		8,704	100.0
Republican hold			

=== District 51 ===
Nonpartisan primary election
Party	Candidate	Votes	%
Independent	Coby Chock	173	100.0
Total votes		173	100.0

Republican primary election
Party	Candidate	Votes	%
Republican	Noe Galea'i	667	100.0
Total votes		667	100.0

Democratic primary election
Party	Candidate	Votes	%
Democratic	Chris Lee (incumbent)	4,413	100.0
Total votes		4,413	100.0

- Independent Coby Chock was denied access to the general election ballot.

Hawaii's 51st House District general election, 2018
Party	Candidate	Votes	%
Democratic	Chris Lee (incumbent)	6,106	69.3
Republican	Noe Galea'i	2,706	30.7
Total votes		8,812	100.0
Democratic hold			

== See also ==
- United States elections, 2018
- United States Senate election in Hawaii, 2018
- United States House of Representatives elections in Hawaii, 2018
- Hawaii gubernatorial election, 2018
- Hawaii State Senate elections, 2018
- Hawaii elections, 2018
