= Marozzi =

Marozzi is an Italian surname. Notable people with the surname include:

- Eli Marozzi (1913–1999), Italian-born American sculptor, ceramist, teacher, and illustrator
- Fabio Marozzi (born 1967), Argentinian footballer
- Justin Marozzi (born 1970), English journalist, historian, and travel writer
- Marco Marozzi (born 1999), Italian footballer

== See also ==
- Marozzo
