= Ikaika Hussey =

American politician

Member of the Hawaii House of Representatives from the 29th district
- Incumbent
- Assumed office November 5, 2024
- Preceded by: May Mizuno

Personal details
- Born: Honolulu, Hawaii
- Party: Democratic
- Spouse: Marti Townsend
- Children: 3
- Education: University of Hawaiʻi at Mānoa (BA, MA)

Ikaika Michael Lardizabal Hussey is an American politician serving as a member of the Hawaii House of Representatives for the 29th district since 2024.

== Early life and education ==
Hussey was born in Honolulu, Hawaii. He graduated from ʻIolani School and earned a master's degree in political science from the University of Hawaiʻi at Mānoa.

== Political career ==
Hussey first ran for the Hawaii House of Representatives in the 50th district in 2000 at 22-years old, losing to incumbent Republican David Pendleton by 18% of the vote.

In 2016, Hussey challenged incumbent Democratic state representative John Mizuno in the 28th district. Hussey's challenge was noted as the first primary opponent that Mizuno had faced since originally being elected in 2006.

Hussey ran for the 6th district of the Honolulu City Council in 2018, placing second with 22.6% of the vote behind incumbent Carol Fukunaga's 52.6% of the vote. He ran for the same seat in 2022, placing third in the primary election with 18.9% of the vote.

In the 2024 election, Hussey ran for the 29th district of the Hawaii House of Representatives and defeated appointed incumbent May Mizuno in the Democratic primary election. May Mizuno had been appointed to the seat by governor Josh Green to succeed her husband, John Mizuno, after he resigned to take a job in Green's administration.

In the 2026 election, Hussey narrowly defeated John Mizuno for re-nomination by 36 votes.

== Personal life ==
Hussey is half Filipino and of mixed Native Hawaiian and Caucasian descent. He is a supporter of the Hawaiian sovereignty movement, with a July 2019 article published by the The Christian Science Monitor stating "He imagines independence as a multicultural, inclusive, and socially democratic nation." As of 2016, Hussey was married to director of Sierra Club Hawaii Marti Townsend, with whom he had three children.
