= Garner Shimizu =

American politician (born 1958/1959)

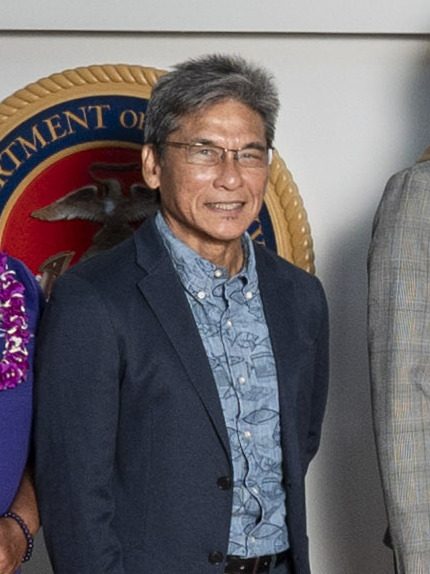
- Shimizu in 2024

Member of the Hawaii House of Representatives from the 32nd district
- In office November 5, 2024 – November 3, 2026
- Preceded by: Micah Aiu
- Succeeded by: Micah Aiu

Personal details
- Born: 1958 or 1959 (age 67–68)
- Party: Republican

Garner Musashi Shimizu (born c. 1958/1959) is an American politician who served as a member of the Hawaii House of Representatives from 2024 to 2026. A Republican, he flipped the seat held by incumbent Micah Aiu in the 2024 election but lost to Aiu in a rematch in 2026.

== Life and career ==
Shimizu was born and raised in Moanalua, a neighborhood of Honolulu. Shimizu has a background in mechanical engineering and worked as a consultant prior to running for office. He is co-owner of a sheet metal company in Hawaii.

=== Hawaii State House of Representatives (2024–2026) ===
While serving in the House, Shimizu voted against ending religious exemptions to mandatory immunizations in schools and was involved in a dispute against other Republicans around mandatory vaccines. He, along with fellow Hawaii legislators Mark Hashem, Diamond Garcia, Julie Reyes Oda, David Alcos, and Samantha DeCorte, took part in the 50 States One Israel conference in 2025, which was criticized by Jewish Voice for Peace. The following year, he co-sponsored a bill to eliminate the state income tax in Hawaii.

== Elections ==
Shimizu first ran for election to the Hawaii House of Representatives in 2010, running for an open seat to represent the 31st District as a Republican. He lost the election to Linda Ichiyama. He challenged her again in 2012, focusing his campaign on Ichiyama's young age and describing himself as having a "full range of life experiences." He again lost the general election.

Shimizu ran for election in the 32nd district in 2022, narrowly losing to incumbent Micah Aiu. His campaign focused on increasing transparency in government and reducing the cost of living in Hawaii. He ran again for the seat in 2024, winning by a margin of only 78 votes and flipping the seat.

In 2026, Aiu challenged him and reclaimed the seat in the general election with 49.3% of the vote to Shimizu's 47.5%.
