= Shirley Ann Templo =

American politician

Member of the Hawaii House of Representatives from the 30th district
- Incumbent
- Assumed office November 5, 2024
- Preceded by: Sonny Ganaden

Personal details
- Born: Honolulu, Hawaii, U.S.
- Party: Democratic

Shirley Ann Labadan Templo is an American politician serving as a member of the Hawaii House of Representatives for the 30th district since 2024. She defeated incumbent Sonny Ganaden in the Democratic primary and was elected in the 2024 election.

== Hawaii House of Representatives ==
Templo challenged incumbent Sonny Ganaden in the Democratic primary for the 30th district of the Hawaii House of Representatives in 2024. She narrowly defeated him by 49 votes in a low turnout contest after automatic recount of the results. She defeated Republican nominee P.M. Azinga in the general election.

== Electoral history ==
Hawaii House of Representatives District 30 Democratic primary election, 2024
Party	Candidate	Votes	%
Democratic	Shirley Ann Templo	757	43%
Democratic	Sonny Ganaden (incumbent)	708	40.2%
	Blank votes	130	7.4%
	Over votes	2	0.1%
Total votes		1,597	100%

Hawaii House of Representatives District 30 general election, 2024
Party	Candidate	Votes	%
Democratic	Shirley Ann Templo	3,397	64.8%
Republican	P.M. Azinga	1,515	28.9%
	Blank votes	329	6.3%
	Over votes	2	0.1%
Total votes		4,914	100%
Democratic hold			
