= Marozzo =

Marozzo is an Italian surname. Notable people with the surname include:

- Achille Marozzo (1484–1553), Italian fencing master
- Nicola Marozzo (born 1965), Italian racing driver

== See also ==
- Marozzi
