= Val Okimoto =

Honolulu City Council Member

Member of the Honolulu City Council from the 8th district
- Incumbent
- Assumed office November 29, 2022
- Preceded by: Brandon Elefante

Minority Leader of the Hawaii House of Representatives
- In office February 17, 2021 – November 8, 2022
- Preceded by: Gene Ward
- Succeeded by: Lauren Matsumoto

Member of the Hawaii House of Representatives from the 36th district
- In office November 6, 2018 – November 8, 2022
- Preceded by: Beth Fukumoto
- Succeeded by: Redistricted

Personal details
- Born: 1975 or 1976 (age 49–50) Lihue, Hawaii, U.S.
- Party: Republican
- Children: 2
- Education: Brigham Young University, Hawaii (BS); Chaminade University (GrCert)
- Website: Campaign website

Val Aquino Okimoto (née Aquino) is an American politician and educator, who has served on the Honolulu City Council as the member representing District VIII since 2022. From 2018 to 2022, she served in the Hawaii House of Representatives.

Okimoto was elected to represent District VIII on the Honolulu City Council, the legislative body of the City and County of Honolulu, on November 8, 2022. She was appointed to fill the vacancy caused by the election of Brandon Elefante to the Hawaii Senate on November 29, 2022.

Okimoto previously served as the state Representative for District 36 and is a member of the Republican Party. Okimoto is a 2019 graduate of the Council of State Governments West - Western Legislative Academy, and is a recipient of a 2020 Elected Women of Excellence Award from the National Foundation for Women Legislators. She was elected to serve as Minority Leader on February 17, 2021.

== Background ==
Okimoto was born in Lihue, Hawaii. She is of Japanese and Filipino descent. She graduated from high school with honors from Kauai High School. Okimoto earned a bachelor's degree in Accounting with a minor in Business Management from Brigham Young University of Hawaii, and earned her Special Education Teacher Certification at Chaminade University of Honolulu. Okimoto has done mission work for the Church of Jesus Christ of Latter-day Saints in Cebu, Philippines. She is an active member of the community by serving as a Director and Treasurer of the Mililani Town Association (MTA), School Community Council (SCC) board member at Mililani ‘Ike Elementary School, member of the Board of Directors for Hoaloha ‘Ike, Parent and Coach for Mililani American Youth Soccer Organization (AYSO), and served for 4 years as the President of her church's chapter of a woman's organization.

== Political career ==
Okimoto was elected to represent District 36 of the Hawaii House of Representatives, which includes Mililani Mauka, Mililani, and Waipiʻo Acres, on November 6, 2018. She was re-elected for a second term on November 3, 2020. On November 8, 2022, Okimoto was elected to represent District VIII on the Honolulu City Council.

A social and fiscal conservative, Okimoto opposed gay marriage legislation in 2013 and bills supporting adoption rights for same-sex couples.

=== Electoral history ===
2022 General Election for Honolulu City Council District VIII
Party	Candidate	Votes	%
Nonpartisan	Val Okimoto	22,456	53.8%
Nonpartisan	Ron Menor	16,745	40.1%

2020 General Election for Hawaii House of Representatives District 36
Party	Candidate	Votes	%
Republican	Val Okimoto	6,949	50.2%
Democratic	Trish La Chica	6,337	45.8%

2018 General Election for Hawaii House of Representatives District 36
Party	Candidate	Votes	%
Republican	Val Okimoto	4,933	51.3%
Democratic	Marilyn Lee	4,081	42.4%

=== Committee assignments ===
June 18, 2025-Present

- Committee on Budget, Chair
- Committee on Infrastructure, Transportation and Technology, Vice Chair
- Committee on Executive Management
- Committee on International and Legal Affairs
- Committee on Public Safety and Economy
- Committee on Zoning and Planning

January 3, 2025-June 17, 2025 (Honolulu City Council)

- Committee on Public Safety and Customer Services, Chair
- Committee on Planning, Infrastructure and Transportation, Vice Chair
- Committee on International and Legal Affairs
- Committee on Zoning
- Committee on Innovation, Technology and Entertainment

2022-2024 (Honolulu City Council)

- Committee on Public Safety, Chair
- Committee on Parks, Enterprise Services and Culture and the Arts, Vice Chair
- Committee on Executive Matters and Legal Affairs
- Committee on Transportation
- Committee on Housing, Sustainability and Health
- Committee on Planning and the Economy

2021-2022 (31st Legislature)

- Committee on Economic Development
- Committee on Education
- Committee on Higher Education & Technology
- Committee on Labor & Tourism
- Committee on Legislative Management (beginning February 17, 2021)

2019-2020 (30th Legislature)

- Committee on Agriculture (2019)
- Committee on Lower & Higher Education
- Committee on Tourism & International Affairs
- Committee on Transportation (2020)

Hawaii House of Representatives
Preceded by Gene Ward	Minority Leader of the Hawaii House of Representatives; 2021–2022	Succeeded by Lauren Matsumoto
