= Lauren Matsumoto =

American politician (born 1987)

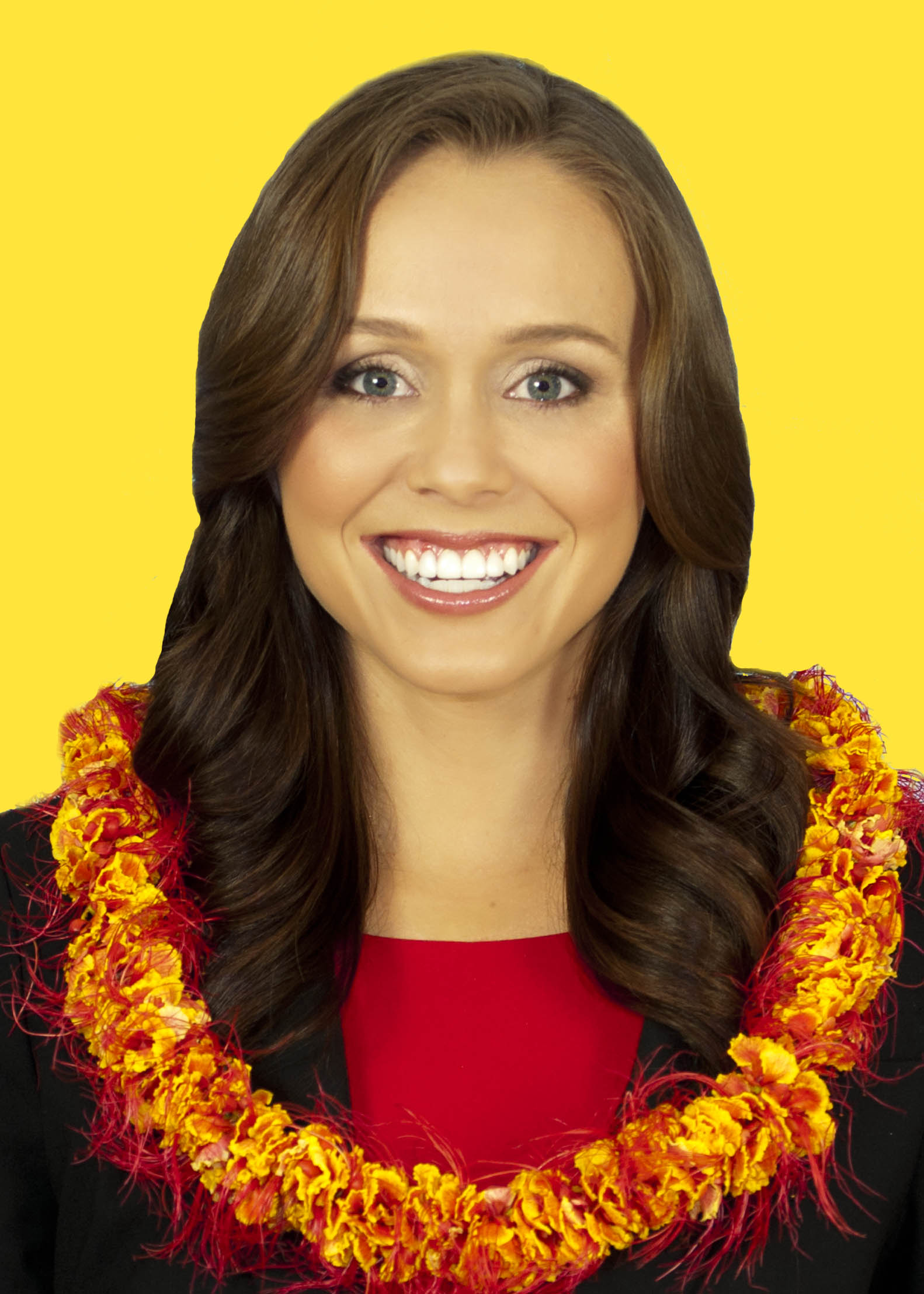

Minority Leader of the Hawaii House of Representatives
- Incumbent
- Assumed office November 8, 2022
- Preceded by: Val Okimoto

Member of the Hawaii House of Representatives
- Incumbent
- Assumed office November 6, 2012
- Preceded by: Constituency established
- Constituency: 45th District (2012–2022); 38th District (2022–Present)

Personal details
- Born: Lauren Kealohilani Cheape; August 16, 1987 (age 38) Mililani, Hawaii, U.S.
- Party: Republican
- Spouse: Scott Matsumoto (m. 2013)
- Children: 2
- Education: University of Hawaiʻi at Mānoa (BA); Hawaii Pacific University (MBA)
- Website: Official website

Lauren Kealohilani Cheape Matsumoto (born August 16, 1987) is an American politician and beauty pageant titleholder who currently serves as a member of the Hawaii State House from Hawaii's 38th District, previously the 45th District from 2012 to 2022. Matsumoto represents Schofield, Mokuleia, Waialua, Kunia, Waipio Acres, and her hometown of Mililani in the Hawaii State House of Representatives. She holds the title of Miss Hawaii 2011, and competed in the Miss America 2012 pageant in Las Vegas, Nevada. She was born and raised in Mililani, Hawaii.

== Personal life ==
Matsumoto was born Lauren Kealohilani Cheape and raised in Mililani on O'ahu, where she attended Mililani Waena Elementary, was a member of the first class to attend Mililani Middle School, and graduated from Mililani High School. She participated in many activities, including the jump rope team, volleyball, swimming, water polo, and the symphonic ensemble.

Cheape graduated from University of Hawaiʻi Academy for Creative Media with a B.A. in film production and minored in both Business and Japanese. Her first experience with the legislature was with her documentary, Farm Grown, which helped pass the Feed Subsidy Bill. Cheape was a four-year Division I scholar-athlete at the University of Hawaiʻi as a Wahine Water Polo player. She was also a member of the Student Athlete Advisory Committee and initiated the C.A.R.E. (Collegiate Athletes Reaching Everyone) program, which uses student-athletes to encourage youth to excel in academics and participate in athletics. Cheape earned an MBA from Hawaii Pacific University in May 2015.

In July 2013, Cheape married Scott Matsumoto, a firefighter for the Honolulu Fire Department, and changed her name to Lauren Matsumoto. The pair met at their church, One Love, where they are active members. Their first child, Noah, was born in August 2017.

== Beauty pageants ==
Matsumoto competed at Miss Hawaii 2011 as Miss East Oahu. Her talent was a jump rope routine, which she took up after seeing a jump rope team perform at her school. Her platform is C.A.R.E.: Collegiate Athletes Reaching Everyone. She won the Miss Hawaii title on her fourth try. She represented Hawaii at the National Sweetheart 2010 pageant, a spot she earned by placing 2nd runner-up to Miss Hawaii 2010. She was named a Quality of Life Finalist and won the Children's Miracle Network Hospitals Award for most money raised in the country, which benefited Kapiolani Medical Center for Women and Children, at the Miss America 2012 pageant.

== Political career ==
Matsumoto ran a successful campaign for election in 2012 to the newly formed District 45 of the Hawaii State House on Oahu, Hawaii. District 45 comprises Matsumoto's hometown of Mililani as well as Schofield, Wheeler, Mokuleia, and Waialua. She ran unopposed in the primaries as a Republican candidate.

Matsumoto campaigned on expanding local agriculture, strengthening education, improving the local economy, and advocating for responsible environmental policies.

Matsumoto was hospitalized with occupational burnout for two weeks during her first term in office.

Awards and achievements
| Preceded by Jalee Fuselier | Miss Hawaii; 2011 | Succeeded by Skyler Kamaka |
Hawaii House of Representatives
| Preceded by Jo Jordan | Member of the Hawaii House of Representatives from the 45th district 2012–2022 | Succeeded by Cedric Gates |
| Preceded by Henry Aquino | Member of the Hawaii House of Representatives from the 38th district 2022–present | Incumbent |
| Preceded by Val Okimoto | Minority Leader of the Hawaii House of Representatives; 2022–present | Incumbent |
