= Denny Coffman =

American politician

Member of the Hawaii House of Representatives from the 5th district 6th (2008–2012)
- In office November 4, 2008 – December 20, 2013
- Preceded by: Josh Green
- Succeeded by: Richard Creagan

Personal details
- Party: Democratic
- Website: dennycoffman.org

Denny Coffman is an American politician and former Democratic member of the Hawaii House of Representatives who represented District 5 until his resignation on December 20, 2013. Coffman served as the representative for District 6 from 2008 to 2012, before reapportionment placed him in District 5.

== Education ==
Coffman earned his associate degree in data processing and his bachelor's degree in business administration.

== Elections ==
- 2012 Redistricted to District 5, and with Democratic Representative Bob Herkes running for Hawaii Senate, Coffman won the August 11, 2012 Democratic Primary with 2,462 votes (55.9%), and won the November 6, 2012 General election with 5,464 votes (63.2%) against Republican nominee Dave Bateman.
- 2010 Coffman was unopposed for the September 18, 2010 Democratic Primary, winning with 2,490 votes, and won the November 2, 2010 General election with 3,538 votes (49.8%) against Republican nominee Rebecca Leau.
- 2008 When Democratic Representative Josh Green ran for Hawaii Senate and left the District 6 seat open, Coffman won the three-way September 20, 2008 Democratic Primary with 1,426 votes (39.2%), and won the November 4, 2008 General election with 4,520 votes (47.6%) against Republican nominee Andy Smith.
