= Micah Aiu =

American politician (born 1989)

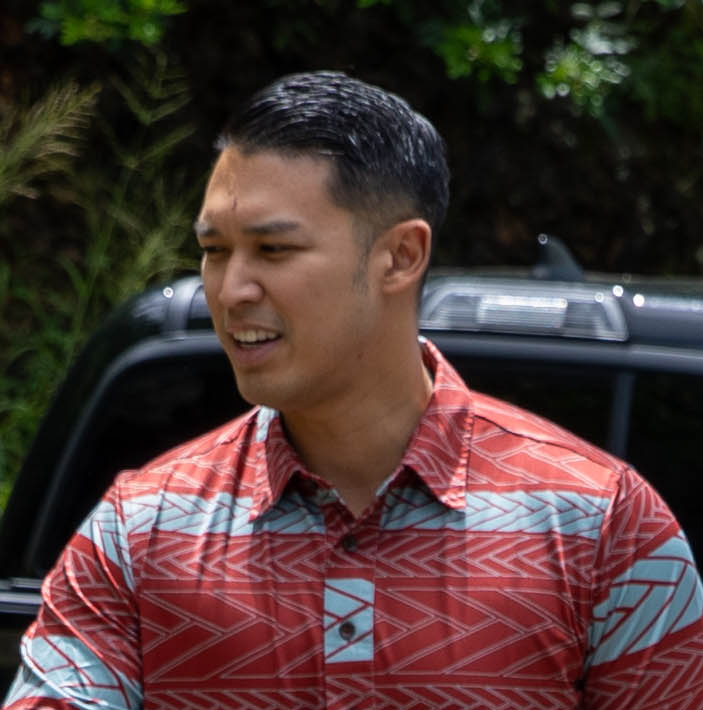
- Aiu in 2023

Member of the Hawaii House of Representatives from the 32nd district
- Incumbent
- Assumed office November 3, 2026
- Preceded by: Garner Shimizu
- In office November 8, 2022 – November 8, 2024
- Preceded by: Redistricted
- Succeeded by: Garner Shimizu

Personal details
- Born: May 24, 1989 (age 37) Honolulu, Hawaii
- Party: Democratic
- Relatives: Donna Mercado Kim (mother)
- Education: Lasell University (BS); William S. Richardson School of Law (JD)
- Profession: Attorney
- Website: https://www.micahaiu.com/

Micah Poʻokela Kim Aiu (born May 24, 1989) is an American Democratic politician serving in the Hawaii House of Representatives for the 32nd district (Fort Shafter, Moanalua, Āliamanu, Foster Village, portions of ʻAiea and Hālawa) since November 2026. He previously served in the seat from 2022 to 2024.

Aiu initially won his seat in the 2022 election against Republican opponent Garner Shimizu, and lost it to Shimizu in the 2024 election. He reclaimed the seat in a rematch with Shimizu in 2026.

== Early life and education ==
Aiu was born May 24, 1989, in Honolulu, Hawaii. He is the son of Robert Aiu, a longtime civil servant and law enforcement official who led the DEA's investigation into yakuza boss Masahisa Takenaka, and Donna Mercado Kim, a member of the Hawaii Senate since 2000 who served as president of the body from 2012 to 2015.

Aiu attended Washington State University and Springfield College before transferring to Lasell University, where he played on the volleyball team and earned a Bachelor of Science in accounting. He then earned a Juris Doctor from the University of Hawaiʻi at Mānoa's William S. Richardson School of Law.

== Career ==
Aiu worked as an attorney at Ashford & Wriston, LLP as of 2022. In March 2023, he was reported to be working as an in-house lawyer for Nan Inc., a construction company which receives state contracts including the Skyline.

== Hawaii House of Representatives ==
Following incumbent Democrat Aaron Ling Johanson's decision to retire, Aiu moved back to Moanalua and ran for the redistricted seat in the 2022 election. He was unopposed in the Democratic primary election and defeated Republican Garner Shimizu in the general election by 246 votes. Upon his election, Aiu and his mother became the first mother and son to concurrently serve in the Hawaii State Legislature.

In June 2024, Aiu was reported to have wrongly claimed a property tax exemption on a Honolulu apartment which was not his primary residence in Moanalua. He informed the city of his change of residence and called the incident "an oversight." He lost to Shimizu by 72 votes in a re-match in the 2024 election.

Aiu ran against Shimizu in the 2026 election. He was unopposed in the Democratic primary election. In October 2026, the Honolulu Civil Beat reported that a campaign mailer for Aiu's campaign stated voters could win a free television and roundtrip flights to Las Vegas for attending an in-person campaign rally. The executive director of the Hawaiʻi Campaign Spending Commission said, "If campaign funds were used to purchase these items for a door prize drawing, we believe that it could be a violation of the use of campaign funds," but noted that the giveaway had not yet occurred.

=== Committees ===
Aiu served as vice chair in the committee on housing and was a member of the committee on finance as well as the committee on transportation.
