= Eli Marozzi =

American sculptor

Eli Raphael Marozzi (1913–1999) was a sculptor, ceramist, teacher, and illustrator.

He was born in Motegallo, Italy, but came to the United States as a child and grew up in Pennsylvania. He served in the United States military from 1941 to 1943. Marozzi received a bachelor's degree from the University of Washington in 1949 and a master's degree from the University of Hawaiʻi at Mānoa in 1952. His public sculptures include:

E Pluribus Unum by Eli Marozzi, 1982

- Nartanam, a cast white marble aggregate relief sculpture at the Tennent Art Foundation Gallery, Honolulu, Hawaii, 1958
- The Cat, a concrete sculpture at Leeward Community College, Honolulu, Hawaii, 1970
- As You Like It, terrazzo sculpture at Honolulu Stadium State Park, Honolulu, Hawaii, 1981
- E Pluribus Unum, a white Vermont marble sculpture at President Thomas Jefferson Elementary School, Honolulu, Hawaii, 1982
- Kuikahi, a terrazzo sculpture at Waianae High School, Honolulu, Hawaii, 1985

In addition to his art and teaching, Marozzi traveled extensively in India, heightening his interest in Indian art and philosophy. His sculpture E Pluribus Unum, installed at Jefferson Elementary School in Honolulu, Hawaii, shows the Indian Hindu influence on the artist's style. He founded the Vedanta Society of Hawaii, and served as president from its inception. He illustrated the book, Buddhist Stories for Children by E. K. Shinkaku Hunt (published by Takiko Ichinose, 1959 ASIN: B0007HEFCU). Marozzi died in a hospice on August 31, 1999 at age 86.

== Printed works ==
- Hunt, E. K. Shinkaku & illustrated by Eli R. Marozzi, Buddhist Stories for Children, Honolulu, Takiko Ichinose, 1959 ASIN: B0007HEFCU
- Eli Raphael Marozzi (1952). The influence of medium and technique on sculptural form, especially in ceramic and stone sculpture. University of Hawaiʻi at Mānoa. Master of Arts Thesis
