= Chris Muraoka =

American politician

Member of the Hawaii House of Representatives from the 45th district
- Incumbent
- Assumed office November 5, 2024
- Preceded by: Cedric Gates

Personal details
- Born: March 25, 1977 (age 49) Waianae, Hawaii
- Party: Republican

Christopher Lee Muraoka (born March 25, 1977) is an American businessman and politician serving as a member of the Hawaii House of Representatives for the 45th district, covering part of west Oahu, since 2024. A Republican, he previously served on the Waianae neighborhood board.

== Early life, education, and career ==
Born and raised in Waianae, Muraoka graduated from Waianae High School in 1995.

Muraoka founded SureCan LLC., a company that contracts workers for jobs around Oahu.

== Hawaii House of Representatives ==
Muraoka announced his campaign for the open 45th district in west Oahu in 2024. He emphasized the issues of homelessness, violent crime, and education in his campaign. Muraoka loaned his campaign $26,000, topping the fundraising field in the district. Muraoka defeated Tiana Wilbur in the primary with 51.3% of the vote. He went on to defeat Democrat Desiré DeSoto in the general election by 209 votes, flipping the seat to Republicans.

In May 2026, Muraoka was the sole member to vote against a bill targeting Citizens United v. FEC. He stated he did not want to vote for the legislation as, according to Hawaii Attorney General Anne E. Lopez, the law would likely be struck down and taxpayers would have to pay the legal fees associated with any court challenges to the legislation.
