= Julie Reyes Oda =

American politician (born 1977)

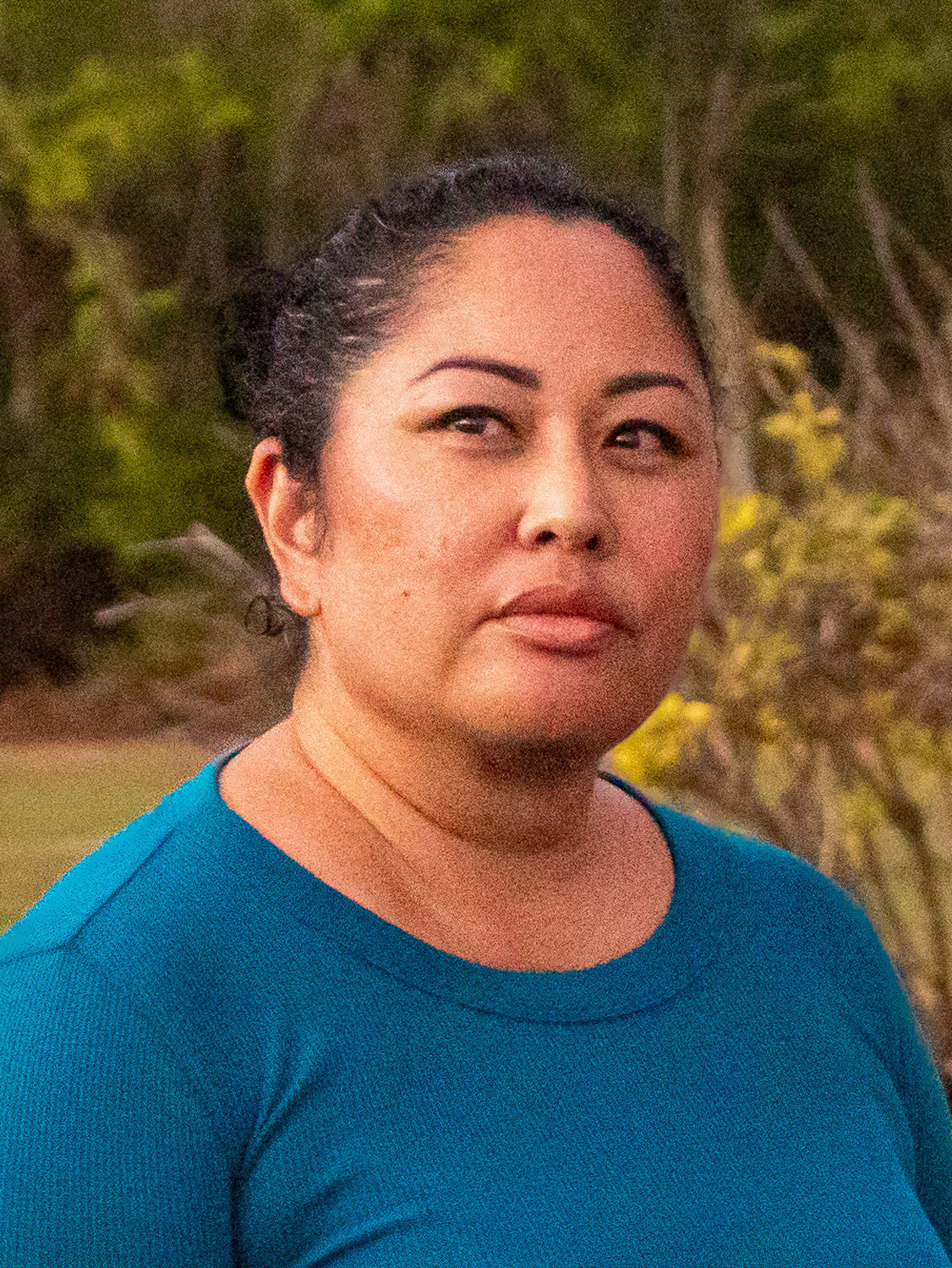
- Oda in 2024

Member of the Hawaii House of Representatives from the 40th district
- Incumbent
- Assumed office November 5, 2024
- Preceded by: Rose Martinez

Personal details
- Born: March 25, 1977 (age 49) Oʻahu, Hawaii
- Party: Republican
- Education: Kapiʻolani Community College (AS); Hawaiʻi Pacific University (BA, MBA, MA); Western Governors University (MA); University of Southern California (EdD)

Julie Kuuleialoha Reyes Oda (born March 25, 1977) is an American politician and educator serving as a member of the Hawaii House of Representatives for the 40th district since 2024.

== Early life and career ==
Reyes Oda was born and raised on Oʻahu to parents who grew up on sugar plantations in Waialua and Honokaʻa. She is of Filipino, Japanese, Hawaiian, and Portuguese descent. She graduated from President William McKinley High School. She then graduated from Kapiʻolani Community College with an Associate of Science in paralegal studies, Hawaiʻi Pacific University with a BA, MBA, and Master of Arts, Western Governors University with a Master of Arts, and the University of Southern California with a Doctor of Education.

Reyes Oda has worked as a mathematics teacher at Nānākuli High and Intermediate School since 2015. She was previously a teacher at the Hale Ho’omalu Juvenile Detention Facility with Olomana High & Intermediate School, a math instructor at Leeward Community College from 2012 to 2014, and a social studies and mathematics teacher at James Campbell High School from 2007 to 2012. She co-wrote a March 2022 article in the Honolulu Civil Beat advocating for expanded Hawaiian language immersion and cultural programs on the Oʻahu's Leeward Coast.

== Hawaii House of Representatives ==
In the 2024 Hawaii House of Representatives election, Reyes Oda defeated incumbent Democrat Rose Martinez.

== Electoral history ==
Hawaii House of Representatives District 40 general election, 2024
Party	Candidate	Votes	%
Republican	Julie Reyes Oda	4,290	49.4
Democratic	Rose Martinez (incumbent)	3,828	44
We the People	Christian Ulufanua	253	2.9
	Blank votes	310	3.6
	Over votes	11	0.1
Total votes		8,692	100%
Republican gain from Democratic			
