= Matthias Kusch =

American politician

Member of the Hawaii House of Representatives from the 1st district
- Incumbent
- Assumed office November 27, 2024
- Appointed by: Josh Green
- Preceded by: Himself
- In office September 12, 2024 – November 5, 2024
- Appointed by: Josh Green
- Preceded by: Mark Nakashima
- Succeeded by: Himself

Personal details
- Party: Democratic
- Education: California State University, Chico

Matthias W. Kusch is an American politician and former firefighter serving as a member of the Hawaii House of Representatives from the 1st district. A Democrat, he was appointed by Governor Josh Green to fill the vacancy caused by Mark Nakashima's death, and re-appointed following Nakashima's posthumous unopposed re-election in 2024.

Kusch attended high school in Davis, California, then graduated from California State University, Chico in 1989. In 2022, he ran for district 2 of the Hawaii County Council, but lost to Jenn Kagiwada.
