= Tina Nakada Grandinetti =

American politician

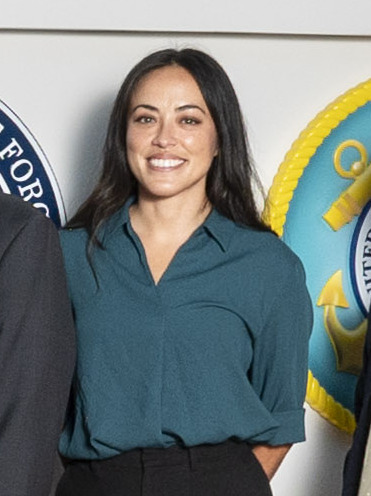
- Grandinetti in 2024

Member of the Hawaii House of Representatives from the 20th district
- Incumbent
- Assumed office November 5, 2024
- Preceded by: Bertrand Kobayashi

Personal details
- Born: O'ahu, Hawaii
- Party: Democratic
- Education: University of Hawaii Manoa (M); RMIT University (PhD)

Tina Nakada Grandinetti is an American politician, who has been serving as a member of the Hawaii House of Representatives for the 20th district since 2024. She has Okinawan ancestry.

Grandinetti was born and raised on O'ahu, graduating from Mililani High School. She then earned a master's degree from the University of Hawaii Manoa and a PhD focused on Hawaii's housing crisis from RMIT University in Australia.
