= Waiʻanae High School =

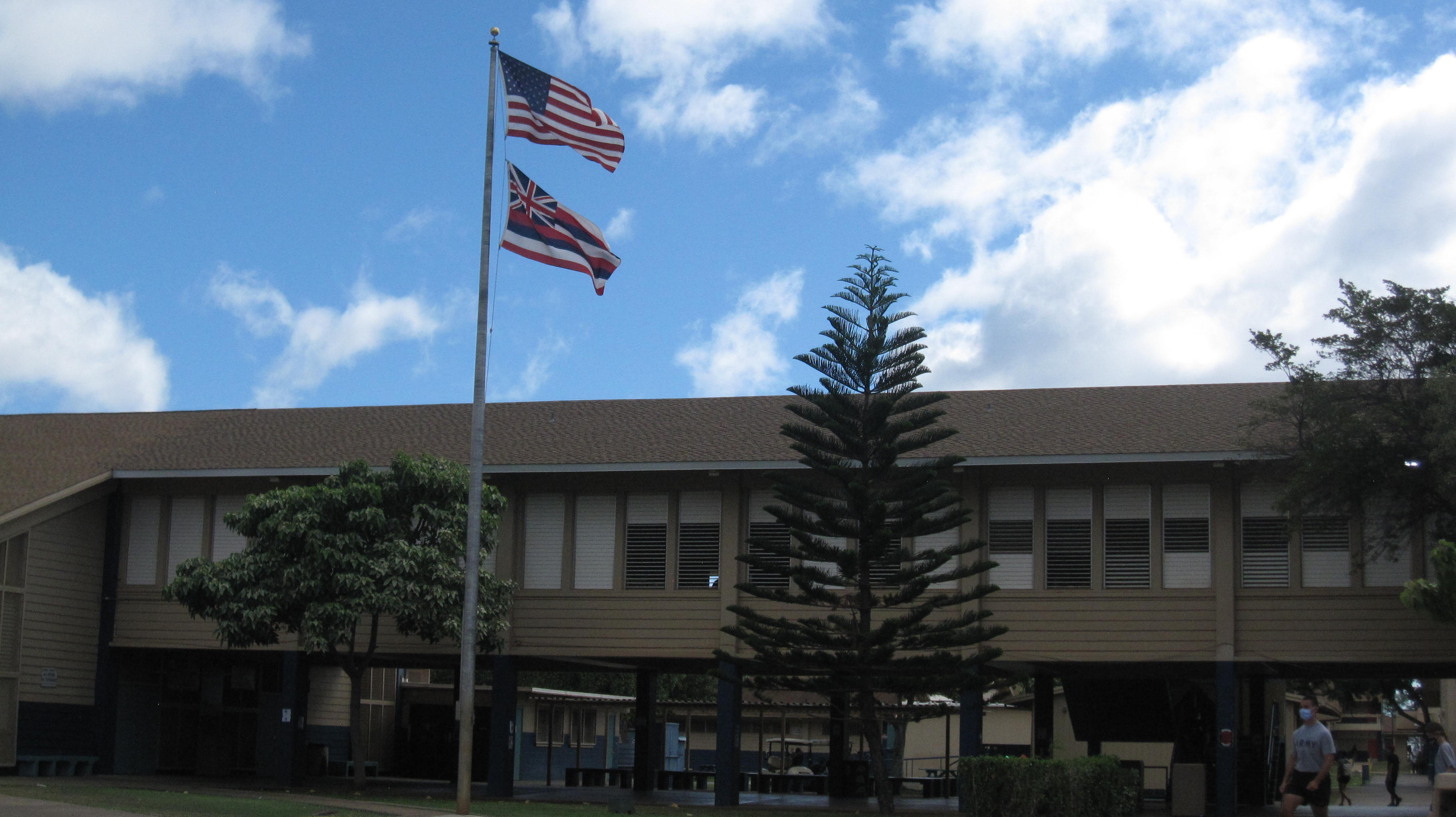

Location
- 85-251 Farrington Highway; Waiʻanae, Hawaii 96792; United States
- 21°27′19″N 158°12′00″W

Information
- School type: Public, high school
- Motto: I mua mākou ʻO Waiʻanae (We of Waiʻanae move forward)
- Established: 1957; 69 years ago
- School district: Leeward District
- Superintendent: Christina Kishimoto
- Principal: Disa Hauge
- Teaching staff: 123.00 (FTE)
- Grades: 9-12
- Gender: Co-educational
- Enrollment: 1,643 (2023–2024)
- Student to teacher ratio: 13.36
- Campus: Rural
- Campus size: 40 acres (0.16 km^{2})
- Colors: Red and Blue
- Athletics: Oahu Interscholastic Association
- Mascot: Searider
- Rival: Kahuku Red Raiders
- Newspaper: Ka Leo O Waiʻanae
- Yearbook: Ke Ahe Kai
- Communities served: Makaha; Makaha Valley; Waiʻanae; Maili
- Website: kaleoowaianae.com

Waiʻanae High School is a public, coeducational secondary school in the City and County of Honolulu, Hawaii, United States, on the leeward (western) coast of the island of Oʻahu. The school about 40 miles (64 km) northwest of central Honolulu CDP. Waiʻanae High School is part of the Leeward School District, under the Hawaii State Department of Education.

== Campus ==
The 40-acre (160,000 m^{2}) campus is located at 85-251 Farrington Highway between two census-designated places (CDPs): Mākaha (to the north), and Waiʻanae (to the south). It has a Wainae postal address. Waiʻanae High School is situated on the coastline; the Pacific Ocean is directly west of the campus and Farrington Highway bordering on the east. This location makes it the only high school in the U.S. built on the beach.

The school's football field, which borders the shoreline, is named after the school's first principal, Raymond Torii. The school's annual commencement ceremony is usually held there.

The campus boasts the sculptures Kuikahi by Eli Marozzi and Four Valleys by Ken Shutt.

== Academics ==
Waiʻanae High initiated its self-contained career academy program in 2004. According to the school's website, the academies provide students work-based education in addition to a core college preparatory curriculum. Each of the four career academies has several hundred students enrolled. Groups of teachers serve in teams in each academy.

- Business/Industrial Education and Technology
- Health and Human Services
- Natural Resources
- Ninth Grade Success Academy
- Searider Productions Academy (formerly Arts & Communications Academy)

== Notable alumni ==
Listed alphabetically by last name (year of graduation):

- Kurt Gouveia (1982) – professional football athlete
- Max Holloway (2010) – professional MMA fighter, former UFC Featherweight Champion
- Jo Jordan, former member of the Hawaii House of Representatives
- Israel Kamakawiwoʻole (1977) – recording artist
- Wade Keliikipi, NFL player
- Kana'i Mauga, professional football linebacker
- Yancy Medeiros – 3rd at Hawaii State Wrestling Championships; professional Mixed Martial Artist, current UFC Lightweight
- Chris Muraoka (1995) – Hawaii state representative (2024–)
- Raquel Paʻaluhi – professional Mixed Martial Artist, currently competing for Invicta FC
- Fiamalu Penitani aka Musashimaru (1989) – sumo wrestler
- Tom Tuinei, NFL player
