= Richard Creagan =

American politician

Member of the Hawaii House of Representatives from the 5th District
- In office January 10, 2014 – November 3, 2020
- Preceded by: Denny Coffman
- Succeeded by: Jeanné Kapela

Personal details
- Born: Naalehu, Hawaii
- Party: Democratic
- Education: University of Hawaiʻi at Hilo; University of Connecticut; Yale University

Richard P. Creagan is an American politician from the Democratic Party of Hawaii. He was a member of the Hawaii House of Representatives from 2014 to 2020.

Creagan was appointed Governor of Hawaii Neil Abercrombie to replace Denny Coffman. In 2019, he introduced a bill to raise the minimum smoking age to 100. This made Hawaii the first state to consider such legislation.
