= Cedric Gates =

American politician

Cedric Asuega Gates

Member of the Hawaii House of Representatives
- In office November 8, 2016 – November 5, 2024
- Preceded by: Jo Jordan
- Succeeded by: Chris Muraoka
- Constituency: 44th District (2016–2022); 45th District (2022–2024)

Personal details
- Born: Cedric Solosolo Asuega Gates
- Party: Democratic
- Other political affiliations: Green (2014)

Cedric Solosolo Asuega Gates is a politician who served as a member of the Hawaii House of Representatives for the 45th district from 2022 to 2024, previously representing the 44th district from 2016 to 2022, as a member of the Democratic Party.

== Early life and education ==
Gates is of African-American and American Samoan descent. His mother, Easter Asuega Gates, died in 2006, and his father, William Gates, died in 2014. According to members of his family, he is the great-grandson of Solosolo Mauga Asuega, who was High Chief of Pago Pago.

Gates attended Waianae High School and graduated in 2010 from YouthBuild Honolulu, an alternative learning program for low-income high school dropouts. He later enrolled at Leeward Community College. In 2013, he was honored by Governor Neil Abercrombie as an Outstanding Advocate for Children and Youth.

== Political career ==
In 2014, Gates ran as a Green Party candidate in District 44, losing to incumbent Democrat Jo Jordan. In 2016, Gates ran against Jordan again, this time in the Democratic primary. Gates' 2016 candidacy was controversial, as his 2014 candidacy as a Green Party candidate was supposed to have barred his nomination as a Democrat under Democratic Party of Hawaii rules.

Nevertheless, Gates defeated incumbent Jo Jordan in the District 44 Democratic primary, and went on to defeat Marc Pa'aluhi in the general election. During the 2016 campaign, his campaign posters were vandalized with a racial slur. Upon taking office at age 23, he became the youngest member of the state legislature. After completing his first term in office, Gates was reelected in 2018 and 2020.

In 2024, Gates ran for District 22 in the Hawaii State Senate and was defeated 44.3% to 53.1% by Samantha DeCorte.
