= Romeo Munoz Cachola =

American politician

Romy Cachola

Member of the Hawaii House of Representatives from the 30th district
- In office November 2, 2012 – November 3, 2020
- Preceded by: Redistricted
- Succeeded by: Sonny Ganaden

Member of the Honolulu City Council from District 7
- In office 2000–2012
- Preceded by: Donna Mercado Kim
- Succeeded by: Joey Manahan

Member of the Hawaii House of Representatives from the 30th district 39th (1984–1992)
- In office 1984–2000
- Succeeded by: Ben Cabreros

Personal details
- Born: March 8, 1938 (age 88) Ilocos Sur, Philippines
- Party: Democratic
- Spouse: Erlinda
- Children: 2
- Education: Manuel L. Quezon University

Romeo Munoz Cachola, commonly known as Romy Cachola, is a Democratic politician from the state of Hawaii and former member of the Hawaii State House of Representatives, representing House District 30 (Kalihi Kai, Sand Island, Hickam, Pearl Harbor, Ford Island, and Halawa Valley Estate) since 2012. He formerly served in the Hawaii State House of Representatives from 1984 to 2000. An immigrant from the Philippines, Cachola became one of the first Filipino Americans to be elected to the Honolulu City Council since statehood in 1959.

== Education ==
Born in the historic Spanish colonial town of Vigan in the Philippines province of Ilocos Sur, Cachola studied at Quezon University near Manila where he obtained his Bachelor of Laws and Master of Laws degrees. After having settled in Honolulu and obtained United States citizenship, Cachola became an entrepreneur and realtor.

== Politics ==
With the urging of fellow Filipino Americans in his neighborhood, Cachola ran for the House District 39 seat comprising Aliamanu, Foster Village, and all the military housing districts on the southern coast of Oahu. He served the district until reapportionment in 1991 placed him in House District 30. He successfully ran for the seat and continued his service as a legislator until his election to the Honolulu City Council in 2000, when he replaced outgoing then-Councilmember Donna Mercado Kim in a special election.

In the Honolulu City Council, Cachola served as chairman of key positions with budget authority. As Chairman of the Zoning Committee, he was considered one of the most powerful politicians in the City & County of Honolulu following the mayor, managing director and council budget chairman. In 2003, Cachola was elected by his fellow council members as floor leader. Cachola was reelected to the Honolulu City Council on September 18, 2004.

In 2005, the City Council approved a tax increase to fund mass transit, the largest and most expensive public works project in state history. In 2007, shortly after the tax went into effect, Cachola was the swing vote in a controversial decision to decide the train's route. Cachola insisted that the route go through Salt Lake as a condition of his support. Though the Council voted 5-4 to approve a route with Cachola's changes, some Salt Lake residents voiced opposition to the noise and property devaluation that they feared rail transit would bring to their community. After the following city elections and over loud objections by Cachola and some Salt Lake residents, the new City Council reconsidered the decision and decided to re-route the rail line to pass by Pearl Harbor and the airport, without a Salt Lake alignment.

Cachola was fined $2,500 in July 2014 by the Hawaii Campaign Spending Commission for state campaign spending violations and had to reimburse his campaign $32,000 for using campaign money to buy a new truck and allegedly use it for personal reasons. He admits no wrongdoing under the terms of the settlement agreement.

In September 2014, the Honolulu Ethics Commission fined Cachola $50,000 "based on a number of aggravating factors in the case, [...] including that the misconduct occurred over several years on a monthly basis, that Cachola knew the ethics laws and their penalties but 'blatantly disregarded' them, and that he failed to cooperate with the commission during its investigation." Honolulu Ethics Commission executive director Chuck Totto said in a news release that "[t]his case is a perfect storm of public corruption," and that the $50,000 was the largest civil fine ever approved by the commission.

In the 2020 Democratic primary elections, he lost his bid for reelection to Sonny Ganaden in a 64% to 36% vote.
