= Sonny Ganaden =

American politician

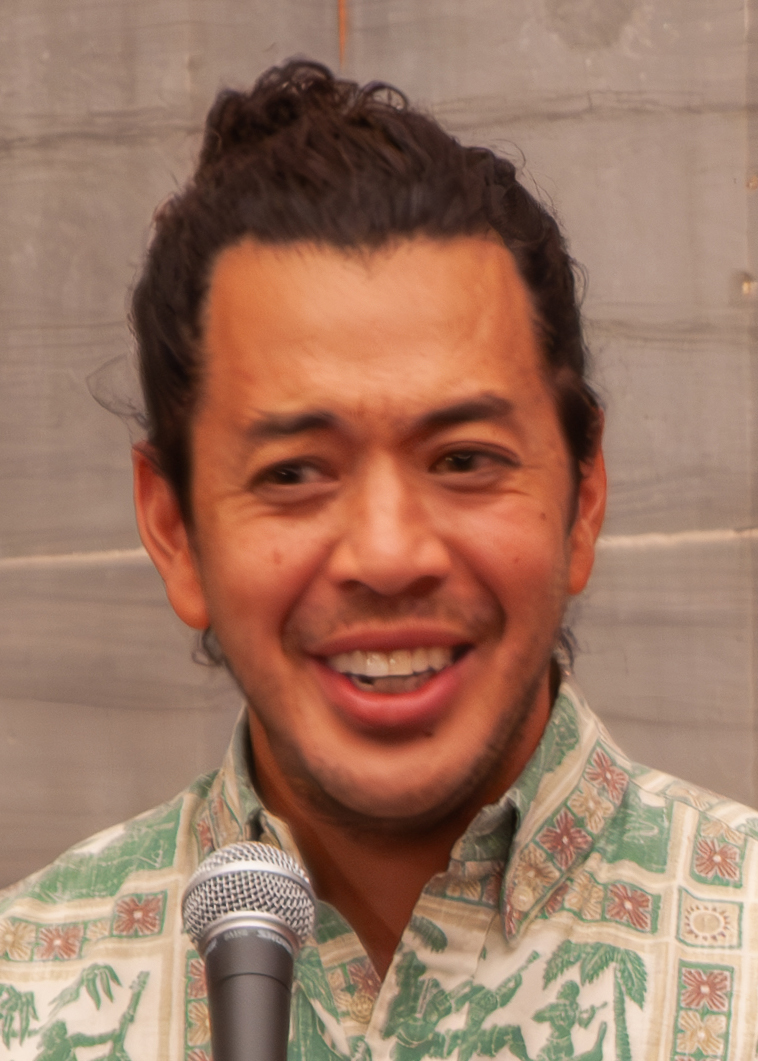
- Ganaden in 2023

Member of the Hawaii House of Representatives from the 30th District
- In office November 3, 2020 – November 5, 2024
- Preceded by: Romeo Munoz Cachola
- Succeeded by: Shirley Ann Templo

Personal details
- Born: Ernesto Montemayor Ganaden; March 14, 1981 (age 45)
- Party: Democratic
- Education: University of California, Los Angeles (B.A.); University of Hawaiʻi at Mānoa (J.D.)

Ernesto Montemayor (Sonny) Ganaden is an American attorney and politician who served as a member of the Hawaii House of Representatives' 30th district from 2020 to 2024.

== Background and education ==
Ernesto Montemayor Ganaden is a second generation Filipino American. Ganaden received his degree in Political Science and Public Policy from the University of California, Los Angeles (UCLA). In 2006, he received his Juris Doctor degree from the University of Hawaiʻi at Mānoa's William S. Richardson School of Law.

== Legal and academic career ==
As an attorney, Ganaden defended the rights of Native Hawaiian elders who were arrested for protesting the construction of the controversial Thirty Meter Telescope. In 2013, Ganaden was the leader writer on the Native Hawaiian Justice Task Force Report, which concluded that Native Hawaiians were disproportionately and unfairly overrepresented in Hawaiian prisons. Ganaden has criticized the existence of private prisons and argued that in "communities where basic human needs are met, crime is rare".

Ganaden was previously an instructor at the University of Hawai'i at Mānoa, teaching in the departments of American studies and ethnic studies. Ganaden contributed an essay to Detours: A Decolonial Guide to Hawai’i, where he wrote about King Kamehameha I's impact on modern Hawaiian law.

== Hawaii House of Representatives ==
=== Elections ===
In 2018, Ganaden ran to represent District 30 in of the Hawaii House of Representatives, where he faced incumbent Romeo Munoz Cachola in the Democratic primary. Cachola narrowly defeated Ganaden by a 51-vote margin.

In 2020, Ganaden ran for the seat once again, defeating incumbent Cachola in the Democratic primary and defeating Republican Tess Quillingking in the general election. During the 2020 campaign, Ganaden spoke out against proposed austerity measures during the COVID-19 pandemic.

In 2024, Ganaden lost renomination in the primary election to Democratic challenger Shirley Ann Templo.

=== Tenure ===
In office, Ganaden has called for the United States Navy to be investigated for potentially misleading regulators about a fuel release into Pearl Harbor, which is part of Ganaden's district. Ganaden was a member of the Progressive Legislative Caucus, a coalition of left-wing members of the Hawaii Legislature.
