= May Mizuno =

American politician

Member of the Hawaii House of Representatives from the 29th district
- In office January 16, 2024 – November 5, 2024
- Appointed by: Josh Green
- Preceded by: John Mizuno
- Succeeded by: Ikaika Hussey

Personal details
- Born: 1969 or 1970 (age 56–57)
- Party: Democratic
- Spouse: John Mizuno

Joje May Besario Mizuno (née Besario) is an American politician and a Democratic member of the Hawaii House of Representatives. In 2024, Governor of Hawaii Josh Green appointed her to succeed her husband John Mizuno. She lost renomination during the primary election that year to Democratic challenger Ikaika Hussey.
