= Fabio Marozzi =

Argentine footballer

Personal information
- Full name: Fabio Norberto Marozzi (Note: In Poland, he was known as Favio Norberto Marozzi, due to a misspelling diffused by sport newspapers)
- Date of birth: 26 June 1967 (age 59)
- Place of birth: Buenos Aires, Argentina
- Height: 1.78 m (5 ft 10 in)
- Position: Forward

Senior career*
Years	Team	Apps	(Gls)
1986–1988	Club Almirante Brown		
1988-1989	Alianza Atlético		
1989–1990	Instituto de Cordoba	2	(0)
1990	Villa Dálmine	2	(0)
1990–1991	Śląsk Wrocław	14	(2)
- * Club domestic league appearances and goals

Fabio Norberto Marozzi (born 26 June 1967) is an Argentine former professional footballer who played primarily as forward.

== Career ==
Born in Buenos Aires, Marozzi began his career at Club Almirante Brown. In 1988, he had a short spell with Peruvian top-flight club Alianza Atlético. In the 1989–90 season, he competed in Argentine Primera División playing for Instituto de Cordoba. In 1990, he played for Villa Dálmine in Primera B Nacional. In the summer of 1990, he joined Polish Ekstraklasa side Śląsk Wrocław, becoming the first foreign player in club's history. He made his league debut in 2–1 win over Zagłębie Sosnowiec on 20 October 1990, scoring a goal. Representing the club for a year-and-a-half, Marozzi made 14 league appearances and scored two goals. After leaving Śląsk, he withdrew from professional football.
