= Jo Jordan =

American politician (born 1962)

Georgette "Jo" Jordan
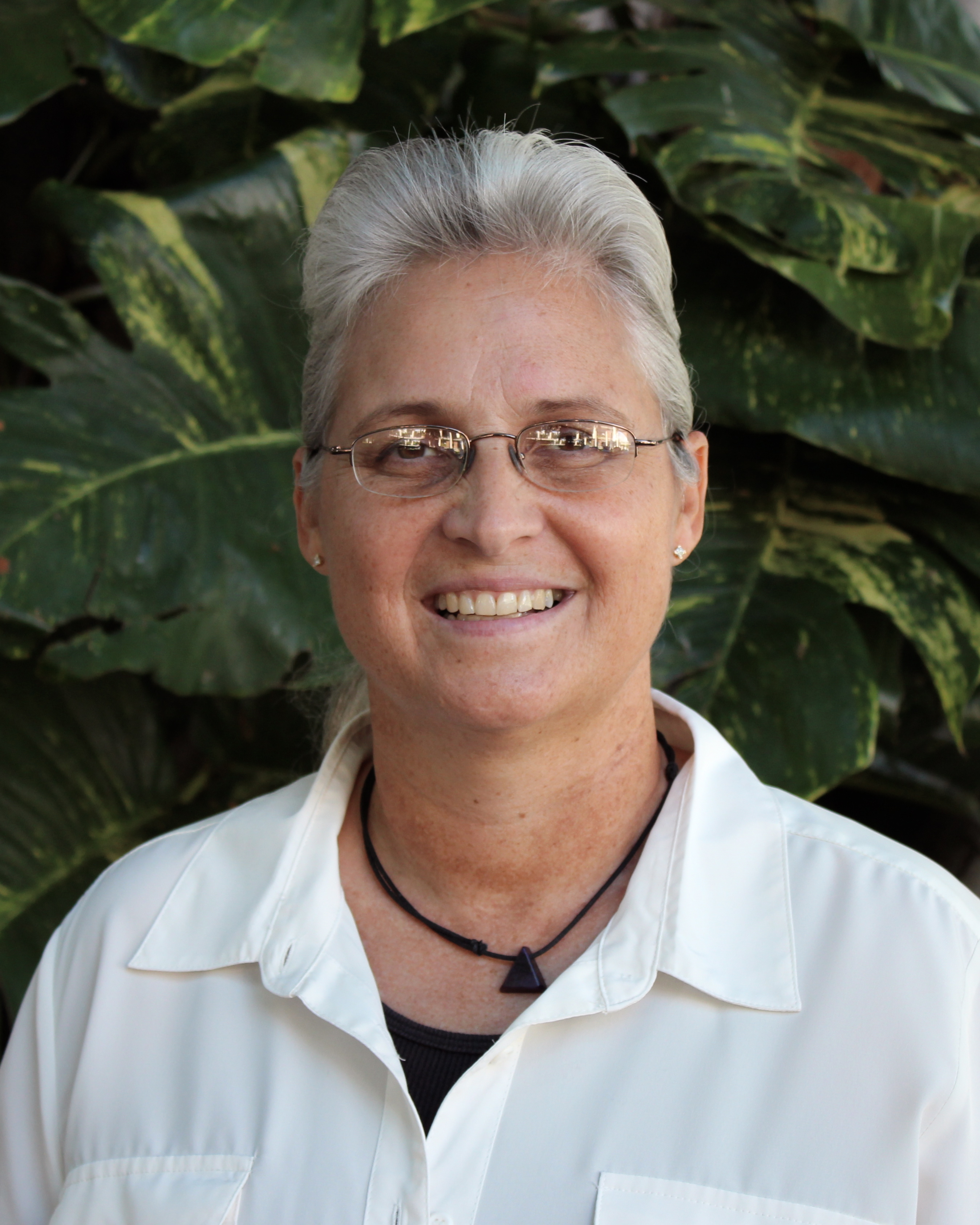

Member of the Hawaii House of Representatives from the 44th district 45th (2011–2012)
- In office January 19, 2011 – November 8, 2016
- Preceded by: Maile Shimabukuro
- Succeeded by: Cedric Gates

Personal details
- Born: May 5, 1962 (age 64)
- Party: Democratic
- Education: Waianae High School
- Occupation: Legislator
- Profession: Tax preparer and small business owner ("The Tax Lady")
- Committees: Finance; Health; Housing; Human Services
- Website: Legislative website

Georgette "Jo" Jordan (born May 5, 1962) is the former Democratic representative of the 44th House District of the Hawaii House of Representatives, which includes Wai‘anae, Mākaha, Makua, and parts of Māʻili on the island of Oahu. Jordan was appointed to the seat by Governor Neil Abercrombie on January 19, 2011 after the seat was vacated by Maile Shimabukuro, who filled Colleen Hanabusa's vacated Senate seat. Cedric Asuega Gates defeated incumbent Jo Jordan in the Hawaii House of Representatives District 44 Democratic primary.

== Legislative history ==
=== 2011–2012: Appointment to and First Term in the House ===
Jordan was appointed to her seat in the 45th district by Governor Neil Abercrombie on January 19, 2011. The then-incumbent Maile Shimabukuro was appointed to Colleen Hanabusa's vacated Senate seat.

For the 2011 and 2012 sessions, Jordan sat on five committees in the House of Representatives: Human Services, Culture and the Arts, Finance, Hawaiian Affairs, and Health. She was Vice Chair on the House Committee of Human Services.

Jordan has a TV show on ‘Ōlelo Community Television called Jordan's Journal. On her program, she interviews legislators and community members about issues affecting her district. She has interviewed state representatives such as Sharon Har, Linda Ichiyama, and Marcus Oshiro; community members such as education reform activist Mark Dannog and harbormaster William Aila; and representatives from organizations such as Kamehameha Schools and Ordnance Reef.

Jordan voted in support of Senate Bill 232, which legalized gender-neutral civil unions in Hawaii. The measure passed the House by a vote of 31–19.

In August 2011, Jordan expressed opposition to extending the life of Waimanalo Gulch Sanitary Landfill on the grounds that the deadline did not give sufficient time for the community to express their opinions and that the community had been accepting Oahu's trash for the past twenty years. Jordan urged the City and County of Honolulu's Department of Planning and Permitting to "seriously consider other sites outside of the Leeward Coast."

=== 2013–2016: Election and Second Term in the House ===
On November 6, 2012, Jordan was elected to the recently redistricted 44th district of the Hawaii House of Representatives. She sat on four committees: Finance, Health, Housing, and Human Services.

Jordan, a lesbian, created controversy on November 6, 2013, when she voted against a bill to allow same-sex marriage in Hawaii. Despite her no vote, the bill passed. On November 9, 2013, the Hawaii House passed same-sex marriage, to become the 16th state to do so. It is believed that Jordan is the first openly gay legislator in the US to vote against same-sex marriage.

In 2014, Jo Jordan was re-elected with 60.7% of the vote in the general election against Cedric Gates (23%) of the Green Party and Allen "Al" Frenzel (16.2%) of the Libertarian Party.

In 2016, Cedric Asuega Gates switched parties and ran in the Democratic primary, where he defeated Jordan.
