= Cindy Evans =

American politician (born 1952)

Majority Leader of the Hawaii House of Representatives
- In office 2017
- Preceded by: Scott Saiki
- Succeeded by: Della Au Belatti

Member of the Hawaii House of Representatives from the 7th district
- In office November 5, 2002 – November 2018
- Preceded by: Redistricted
- Succeeded by: David Tarnas

Personal details
- Born: July 26, 1952 (age 74) Urbana, Illinois
- Party: Democratic
- Education: The Evergreen State College

Cynthia 'Cindy' F.W. Evans (born July 26, 1952, in Urbana, Illinois) is an American politician and a former Democratic member of the Hawaii House of Representatives, representing District 7 from 2002 to 2018.

== Education ==
Evans earned her BA from The Evergreen State College.

== Elections ==
- 2002 When Republican Representative Ron Davis was redistricted to District 13, Evans was unopposed for the open District 7 seat in the September 21, 2002 Democratic Primary, winning with 1,573 votes, and won the November 5, 2002 General election with 3,400 votes (49.0%) against incumbent Republican Representative nominee Jim Rath, who had been redistricted from District 6.
- 2004 Evans was unopposed for the September 18, 2004 Democratic Primary, winning with 2,316 votes, and won the November 2, 2004 General election with 4,671 votes (55.3%) against Republican nominee Bill Sanborn.
- 2006 Evans and Sanborn were both unopposed for their September 26, 2006 primaries, setting up a rematch; Evans won the November 7, 2006 General election with 3,977 votes (59.8%) against Sanborn.
- 2008 Evans was unopposed for the September 20, 2008 Democratic Primary, winning with 2,550 votes, and won the November 4, 2008 General election with 6,250 votes (62.1%) against Republican nominee Ronald Dela Cruz.
- 2010 Evans won the September 18, 2010 Democratic Primary with 2,585 votes (67.5%), and won the November 2, 2010 General election with 4,361 votes (57.4%) against Republican nominee Scott Henderson.
- 2012 Evans was unopposed for both the August 11, 2012 Democratic Primary, winning with 3,426 votes, and the November 6, 2012 General election.
