= John Mizuno =

American politician (born 1964)

Vice Speaker of the Hawaii House of Representatives
- In office January 20, 2021 – November 8, 2022
- Preceded by: Mark Nakashima
- Succeeded by: Greggor Ilagan
- In office January 2013 – January 2017
- Preceded by: Joey Manahan
- Succeeded by: Mark Nakashima

Member of the Hawaii House of Representatives
- In office December 2006 – January 2, 2024
- Preceded by: Karl Rhoads
- Succeeded by: May Mizuno
- Constituency: 28th district (2006–2022); 29th district (2022–2024)

Personal details
- Born: August 2, 1964 (age 62) Honolulu, Hawaii, U.S.
- Party: Democratic
- Spouse: May Mizuno
- Education: University of Hawaiʻi at Mānoa (BS); Willamette University (JD)
- Website: State House website

John M. Mizuno (born August 2, 1964) is a Democratic politician who served in the Hawaii House of Representatives from 2006 to 2024. Mizuno was Vice Speaker of the House from 2013 to 2017 and 2021 to 2022.

In the 2026 Hawaii House of Representatives election, Mizuno ran for his former seat in the but lost the Democratic nomination to incumbent Ikaika Hussey.

== Education ==
Mizuno is a graduate of the University of Hawaiʻi at Mānoa and Willamette University College of Law.

== Career ==
Mizuno is the first Hawaii lawmaker to ever be recognized as the Legislator of the Year as a freshman. In 2007, Mizuno was recognized as the Legislator of the Year by the Coalition for a Tobacco Free Hawaii. Mizuno was recognized as Legislator of the Year in 2009 by the Hawaii Psychological Association, and in 2010 Mizuno was awarded the Legislator of the Year title by the United States Humane Society. He served as a House Majority Whip from 2011 until 2013.

In 2017, Mizuno became the Chair of the newly formed super committee of Health and Human Services. This was the first time in the history of the House of Representatives that the Health Committee has ever been combined with the Human Services Committee. Mizuno is the former chair of the Human Services Committee (2009–2012).

Prior to winning elective office, Mizuno was an administrative hearings officer for the Department of Human Services in Hawaii (1992–1998), a special investigator for the Department of Human Services in Hawaii (1998–2003), and a legislative staff member for the House of Representatives (2003–2006).

Mizuno resigned from the Hawaii House in January 2024 to assume the position of coordinator on homelessness under Governor Josh Green; his wife May Mizuno was appointed to succeed him. Mizuno stepped down from the position the following year, after publicly criticizing excessive operating costs of the governor's kauhale initiative.

Hawaii House of Representatives
Preceded by Joey Manahan	Vice Speaker of the Hawaii House of Representatives; 2013–2017	Succeeded by Mark Nakashima
Preceded by Mark Nakashima	Vice Speaker of the Hawaii House of Representatives; 2021–2023	Succeeded by Greggor Ilagan
