= Trish La Chica =

Filipino-born American politician

Member of the Hawaii House of Representatives from the 37th district
- Incumbent
- Assumed office February 15, 2023
- Appointed by: Josh Green
- Preceded by: Ryan Yamane

Personal details
- Born: Manila, Philippines
- Party: Democratic
- Education: Ateneo de Manila University; University of San Francisco

Mae Patricia Quema (Trish) La Chica is a Filipino-born American politician and a Democratic member of the Hawaii House of Representatives. In 2023, Governor Josh Green appointed her to replace Ryan Yamane.
