= Ryan Yamane =

American politician

Member of the Hawaii House of Representatives from the 37th district
- In office November 3, 2004 – January 3, 2023
- Preceded by: Guy Ontai
- Succeeded by: Trish La Chica

Personal details
- Born: October 24, 1969 (age 56) Honolulu, Hawaii, U.S.
- Party: Democratic
- Education: University of Hawaiʻi

Ryan Ichiro Yamane (born October 24, 1969) is an American politician and a Democratic member of the Hawaii House of Representatives from November 2004 to January 2023 representing District 37. He is the son of former representative Brian Yamane.

Yamane was reelected to a two-year term in the 2022 Hawaiʻi House of Representatives election, but resigned on January 3, 2023 to accept an appointment in Governor Josh Green's cabinet. Gov. Green appointed Trish La Chica to the District 37 seat on February 15, 2023.

Yamane served as director of the Hawaii Department of Human Services until May 19, 2026, when he announced his retirement from the department effective immediately. His departure came days after he had been subpoenaed to testify in a state bribery investigation. The office of Governor Josh Green did not provide a reason for Yamane's departure.

== Education ==
Yamane earned his Bachelor of Arts in psychology, his MSW, and his Master of Business Administration from the University of Hawaiʻi.

== Elections ==
- 2002 Yamane attempted to challenge incumbent Republican Representative Guy Ontai for the District 35 seat, but lost the four-way September 21, 2002 Democratic Primary.
- 2004 Yamane and Representative Ontai were both unopposed for their September 18, 2004 primaries, setting up a rematch; Yamane won the November 2, 2004 General election against Ontai.
- 2008 Yamane was unopposed for both the September 20, 2008 Democratic Primary, winning with 4,036 votes, and the November 4, 2008 General election.
- 2010 Yamane was unopposed for the September 18, 2010 Democratic Primary, winning with 4,493 votes, and won the November 2, 2010 General election with 5,092 votes (54.8%) against Republican nominee Beth Fukumoto.
- 2012 Yamane was unopposed for the August 11, 2012 Democratic Primary, winning with 5,510 votes, and won the November 6, 2012 General election with 8,660 votes (75.1%) against Republican nominee Emil Svrcina.

== Controversy ==
As Chair of the House Health, Human Services, and Homelessness Committee he was in charge of amending House Bill 1570. A law that would attempt to rein in tobacco products aimed at young children and teens. His critics have stated that the amendments were "poison pill" amendments meant to "Tank the bill and make sure it never passes." Ryan Yamane has said that the amendments and his decisions around the bill were in no way influenced by the thousands he received in donations from big tobacco companies and corporate lobbyists.

== Bribery indictment ==
In July 2026, an Oʻahu grand jury indicted Yamane as part of a state public-corruption investigation conducted by the Hawaii Department of the Attorney General. He was charged with criminal conspiracy to commit bribery and bribery.

According to the indictment, businessman and lobbyist Tobi Solidum allegedly provided Yamane with cash and checks while seeking government funding for COVID-19 testing programs. Prosecutors alleged that Yamane and Solidum had been in contact beginning in 2020 and cited several instances in which Solidum allegedly arranged payments to Yamane. The indictment also alleged that Yamane later sought amendments to legislation providing additional funding for COVID-19 testing sites.

Yamane pleaded not guilty to the charges on July 30, 2026.
