= Bertrand Kobayashi =

American politician

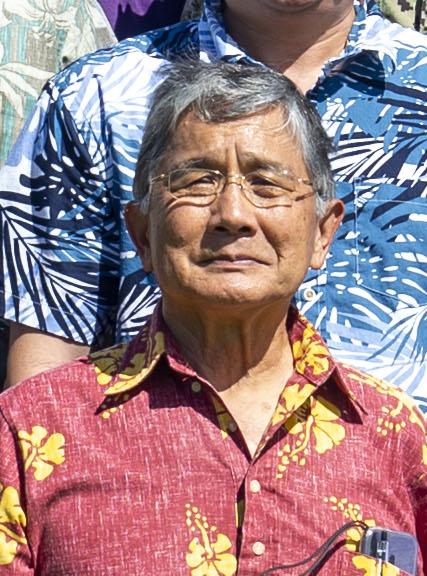
- Kobayashi in 2023

Member of the Hawaii House of Representatives from the 20th district 19th (2012–2022)
- In office November 6, 2012 – November 5, 2024
- Preceded by: Barbara Marumoto
- Succeeded by: Tina Nakada Grandinetti

Member of the Hawaii Senate from the 10th district
- In office 1982–1994
- Succeeded by: Les Ihara Jr.

Member of the Hawaii House of Representatives from the 10th district
- In office 1978–1982
- Preceded by: Lisa Naito
- Succeeded by: Redistricted

Personal details
- Born: June 19, 1944 (age 82) Honolulu, Hawaii, U.S.
- Party: Democratic
- Spouse: Mary Lou
- Children: 1

Bertrand Yoshito Kobayashi (born June 19, 1944) is an American politician and a former Democratic member of the Hawaii State Legislature. Kobayashi has held elected office in the legislature for a combined 28 years, most recently serving in the Hawaii House of Representatives from 2012 to 2024, retiring after a cerebrovascular incident.

On March 3, 2026, Kobayashi was presented with the Order of the Rising Sun, Gold Rays with Rosette, for his work to strengthen ties between Japan, Hawaii, and the United States, especially for his leadership in cultivating Hawaii's sister relationship with Fukuoka Prefecture, Hawaii’s first sister prefecture.

== Education ==
Kobayashi attended Kaimuki High School, received his bachelor's degree at University of Hawaiʻi at Mānoa, and earned his doctorate in political science at Michigan State University. From 1972 to 1975, Kobayashi taught as an assistant professor of government at American University.

== Career ==
In the legislature, Kobayashi helped enact legislation on issues including living will, "Nursing Homes Without Walls" (a community-based alternative to nursing homes), and HIV confidentiality. He also supported the establishment of Kapiʻolani Community College since its initial planning in 1980.

From 1994 to 1997, Kobayashi served as deputy director for community hospitals for the Hawaii Department of Health, where he helped transition the Community Hospital Division to an independent agency. He has also worked for the American Lung Association and Pacific Gateway Center, and worked with Honolulu city councilmember Duke Bainum and state representative Karl Rhoads.

== Elections ==
- 2012 When Republican Representative Barbara Marumoto retired and left the District 19 seat open, Kobayashi won the August 11, 2012 Democratic Primary with 3,272 votes (54.5%) against former Representative Brian Yamane, and won the November 6, 2012 General election with 6,749 votes (62.5%) against Republican nominee Darrell Young.

== Honors ==
- Order of the Rising Sun, Gold Rays with Rosette (2026)
