= David Tarnas =

American politician

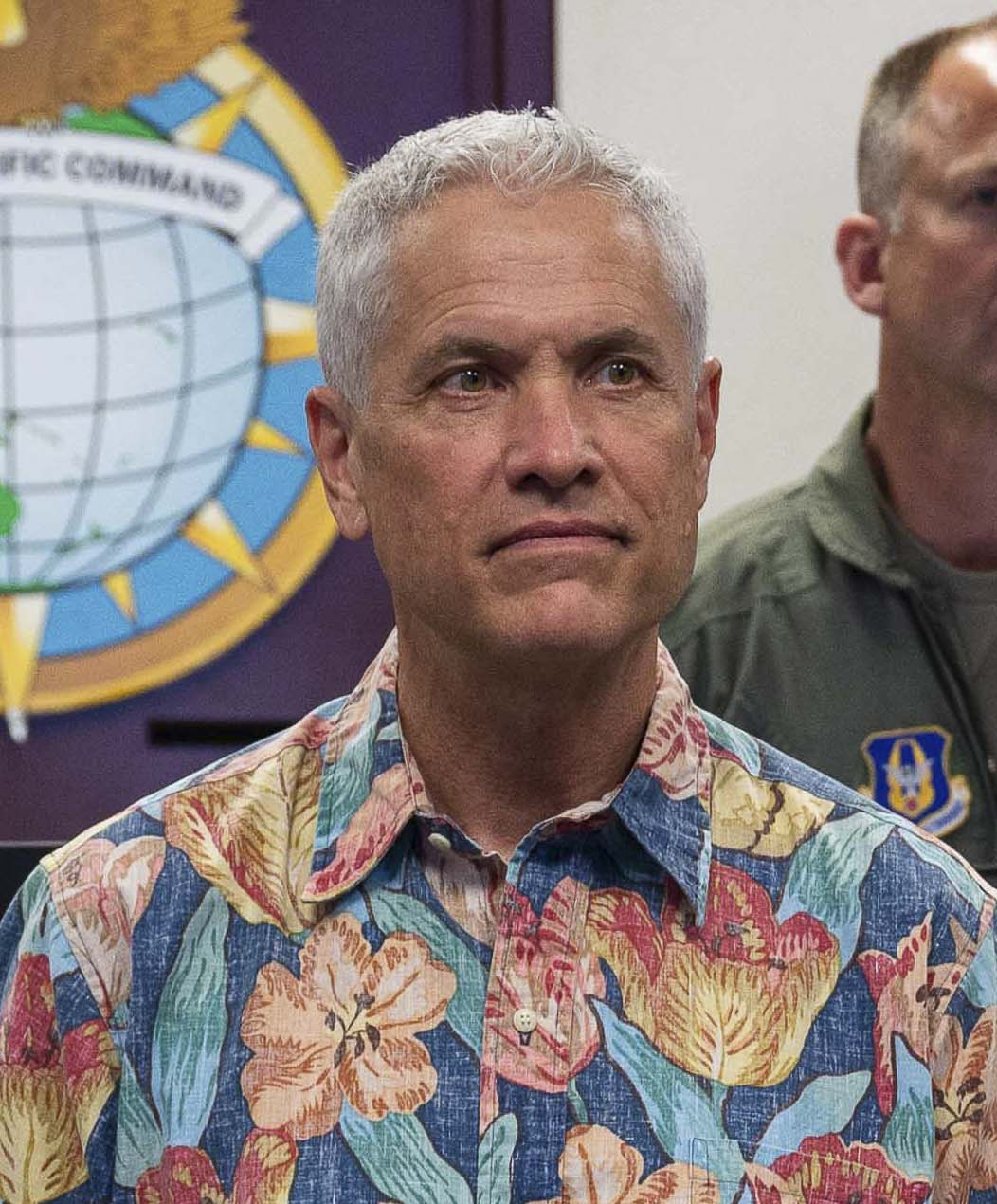
- Tarnas in 2023

Member of the Hawaii House of Representatives
- Incumbent
- Assumed office November 6, 2018
- Preceded by: Cindy Evans
- Constituency: 8th district (2022–present); 7th district (2018–2022)
- In office 1994–1998
- Preceded by: Larry Tanimoto
- Succeeded by: Jim Rath
- Constituency: 6th district (1994–1998)

Personal details
- Born: 1960 or 1961 (age 65–66) Detroit, Michigan, U.S.
- Party: Democratic
- Spouse: Carolyn Stewart
- Children: 2
- Education: Kalamazoo College (BA); University of Washington (MMA)

David Anthony Tarnas is an American politician and planner serving as a Democratic member of the Hawaii House of Representatives. He currently represents the 8th district, which covers North and South Kohala on the island of Hawaiʻi, including the communities of Niuliʻi, Hāwī, Kapaʻau, Kawaihae, Waimea, Waikiʻi, and Waikoloa. He previously served in the Hawaii House of Representatives from 1994 to 1998 and returned to the chamber in 2018.

== Early life and education ==
Tarnas grew up in Detroit, Michigan, graduating from the University of Detroit Jesuit High School and Academy in 1978. He earned a Bachelor of Arts in political science from Kalamazoo College in 1982 and a Master of Marine Affairs (MMA) in coastal and marine resources management policy from the University of Washington in 1985.

== Career ==
Before and between his terms in the Hawaii State Legislature, Tarnas worked in Hawaiʻi as a small business owner, planning consultant, and meeting facilitator. His consulting work involved land use, natural resources, ecosystem protection, renewable energy projects, scientific research facilities, and infrastructure developments such as harbors, highways, farms, ranches, and fishponds. He also co-founded the Malama Kai Foundation and served as the Hawaiʻi County chair of the Democratic Party of Hawaii.

== Hawaii House of Representatives ==
Tarnas first served as the State Representative for Kohala and Kona from 1994–1998. After a 20 year break from politics, he won the 7th district seat by defeating incumbent Democrat Cindy Evans in a primary election, going on to win the general election. He previously ran in a primary against Evans for the same seat in 2016, losing that primary 52.1% to 47.9%. He has since won the Democratic primary and general elections in 2020 and 2022, chairing the Water, Land & Hawaiian Affairs Committee from 2021–2022. and the Judiciary and Hawaiian Affairs Committee in 2023.

== Personal life ==
Tarnas resides in Waimea, Hawaii, with his wife, Carolyn.. They have two adult children.
