= Mark Nakashima =

American politician (1963–2024)

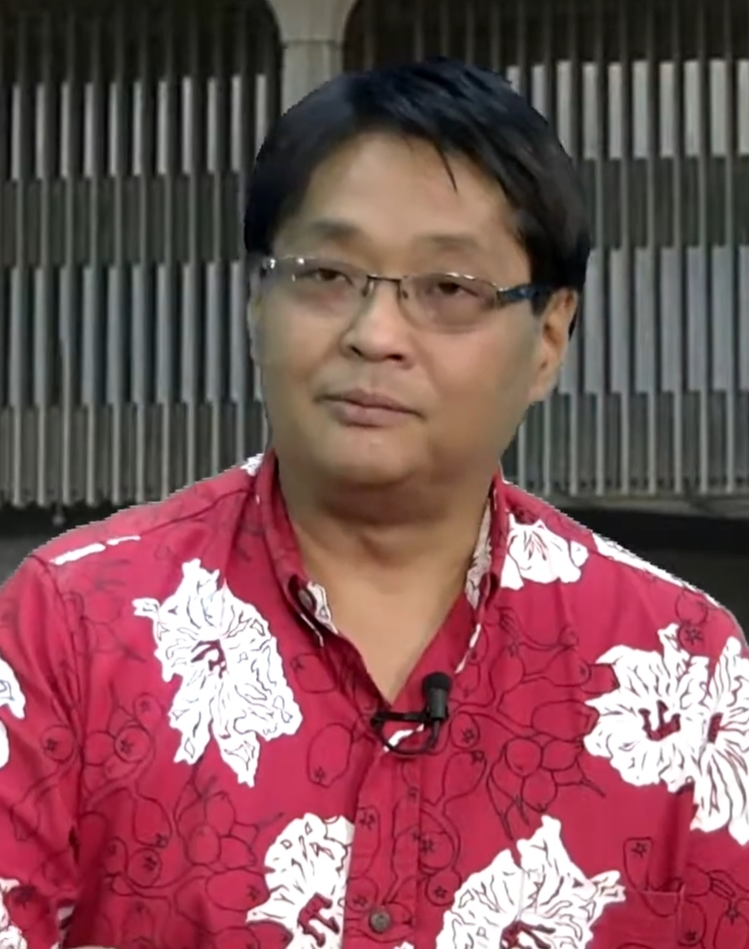
- Nakashima in 2016

Vice Speaker of the Hawaii House of Representatives
- In office January 17, 2018 – January 2021
- Preceded by: John Mizuno
- Succeeded by: John Mizuno

Member of the Hawaii House of Representatives from the 1st district
- In office November 8, 2008 – July 11, 2024
- Preceded by: Dwight Takamine
- Succeeded by: Matthias Kusch

Personal details
- Born: March 27, 1963 Hilo, Hawaii, U.S.
- Died: July 11, 2024 (aged 61) Honolulu, Hawaii, U.S.
- Party: Democratic
- Education: University of Hawaiʻi at Mānoa
- Profession: Legislator (full time)

Mark Masashi Nakashima (March 27, 1963 – July 11, 2024) was an American politician who was a Democratic member of the Hawaii House of Representatives. He was first elected in 2008, and represented the first district, including Hamakua, North Hilo, and South Hilo.

After obtaining a bachelor's degree in education from the University of Hawaiʻi at Mānoa in 1988, he taught at Castle High School and Olomana School's Alder Street Detention Home before transferring back to his alma mater, Honokaa High & Intermediate School. He was also a staff assistant to U.S. Senator Spark Matsunaga. From 1993 until his election to the state legislature, he worked for the Hawaii State Teachers Association, the state affiliate of the National Education Association. While in office, Nakashima helped to raise the minimum wage.

He died in Honolulu on July 11, 2024, at the age of 61.
