= Leeward Community College =

Public college in Pearl City, Hawaii, US

- Motto: To Help People Learn
- Type: Public community college
- Established: 1968; 58 years ago
- Parent institution: University of Hawaiʻi
- Accreditation: ACCJC
- Academic affiliations: Space-grant
- Chancellor: Carlos Peñaloza
- Faculty: 196 full-time faculty
- Undergraduates: 6,500
- Location: Pearl City, Hawaiʻi, United States; 21.393°N 157.984°W
- Website: leeward.hawaii.edu

Leeward Community College is a public community college in Pearl City, Hawaiʻi. It is one of 10 campuses of the University of Hawaiʻi system, and it is accredited by the Accrediting Commission for Community and Junior Colleges.

Leeward practices the open admissions policy, which only requires that a student be 18 years or older or earned a U.S. high school diploma or a GED (General Educational Development) certificate.

== Notable alumni ==
- Jennifer Carroll, 18th Lieutenant Governor of Florida
- Reggie Cross, professional basketball player
- Tulsi Gabbard, 8th Director of National Intelligence, former United States Representative for Hawaii's 2nd congressional district
