= Outline of Hawaii =

U.S. state

The flag of Hawaiʻi

The seal of Hawaiʻi

The location of the state of Hawaiʻi in relation to the rest of the United States of America

The following outline is provided as an overview of and topical guide to the U.S. state of Hawaii:

Hawaii is the newest state among the 50 states of the United States of America. It is also the southernmost state, the only tropical state, and the only state that was previously an independent monarchy.

The state comprises the Hawaiian Islands (with the exception of Midway) in the North Pacific Ocean and is the only U.S. state that is not primarily located on the continent of North America.

== General reference ==
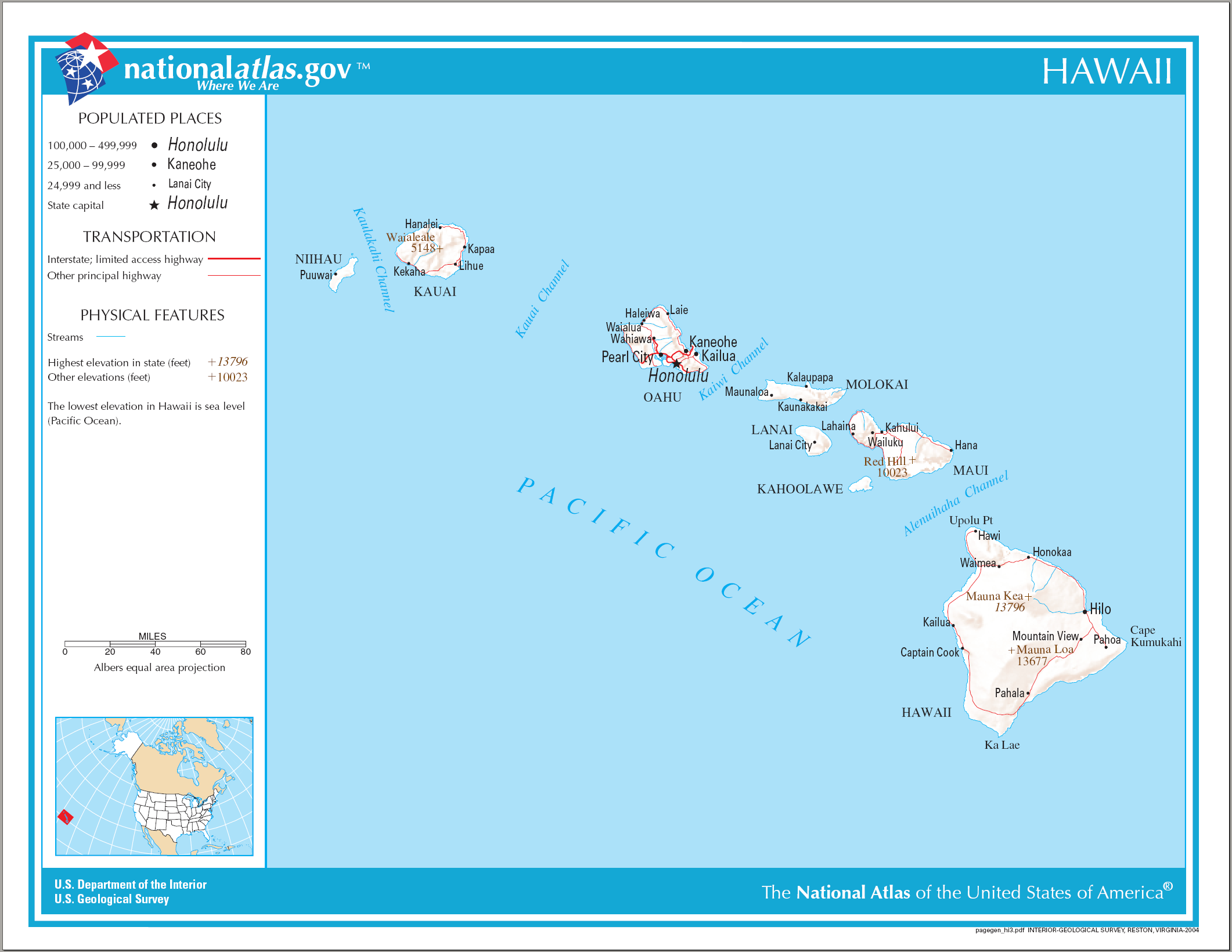
An enlargeable map of the state of Hawaiʻi

- Names
  - Common name: Hawaii
    - Pronunciation: /həˈwaɪ.i/
  - Official name: State of Hawaiʻi (use of ʻokina preferred, but not required), Hawaiian: Mokuʻāina o Hawaiʻi
  - Abbreviations and name codes
    - Postal symbol: HI
    - ISO 3166-2 code: US-HI
    - Internet second-level domain: .hi.us
  - Nicknames
    - Aloha State (currently used on license plates)
    - Paradise of the Pacific
    - Pineapple State
    - Rainbow State
    - Youngest State
- Adjectivals
  - Hawaii
  - Hawaiian
- Demonyms
  - Hawaii Resident
  - Hawaiian
- Transitive verb
  - Hawaiianize

== Geography of Hawaii ==
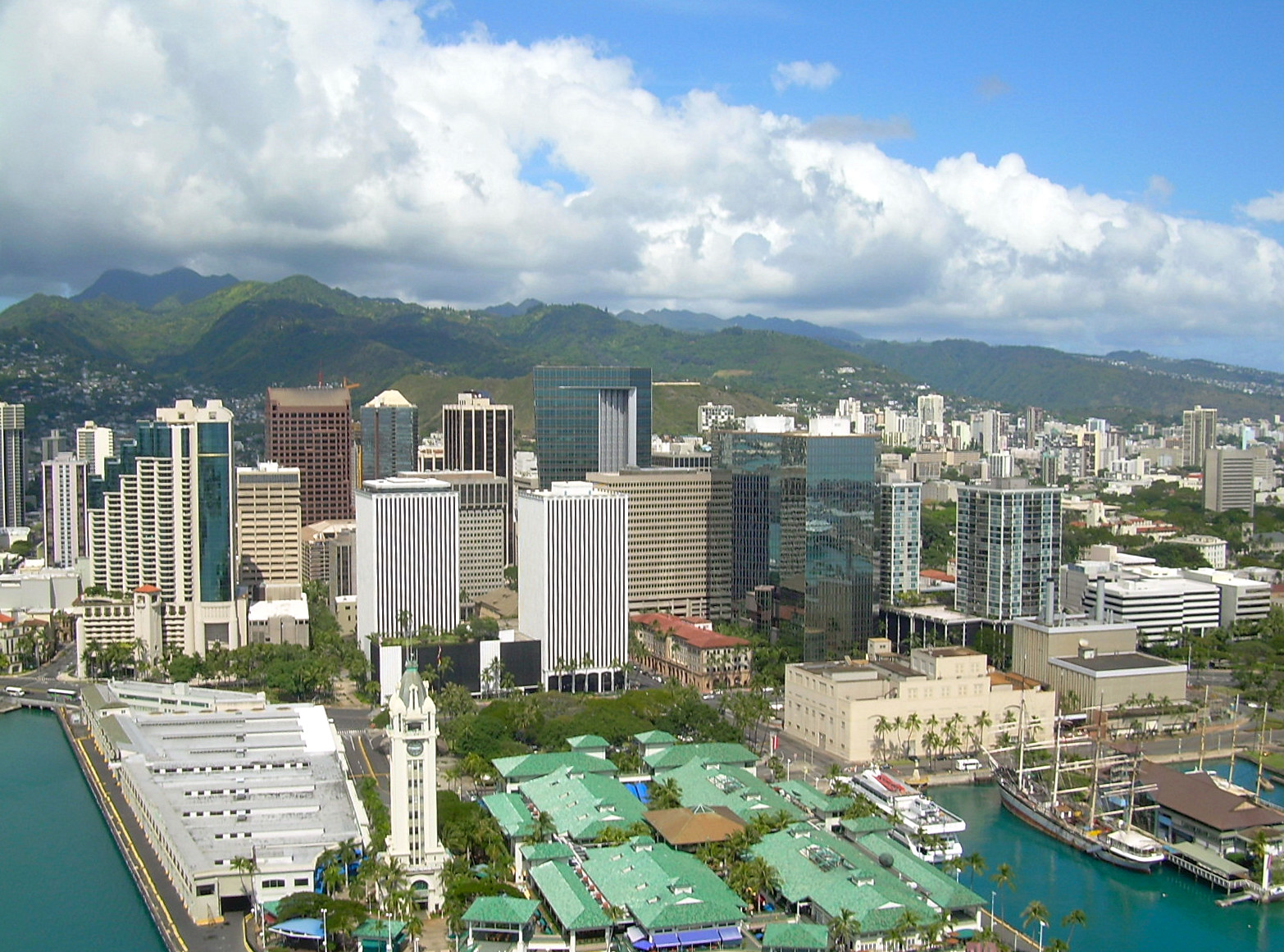
Honolulu, the capital of Hawaii

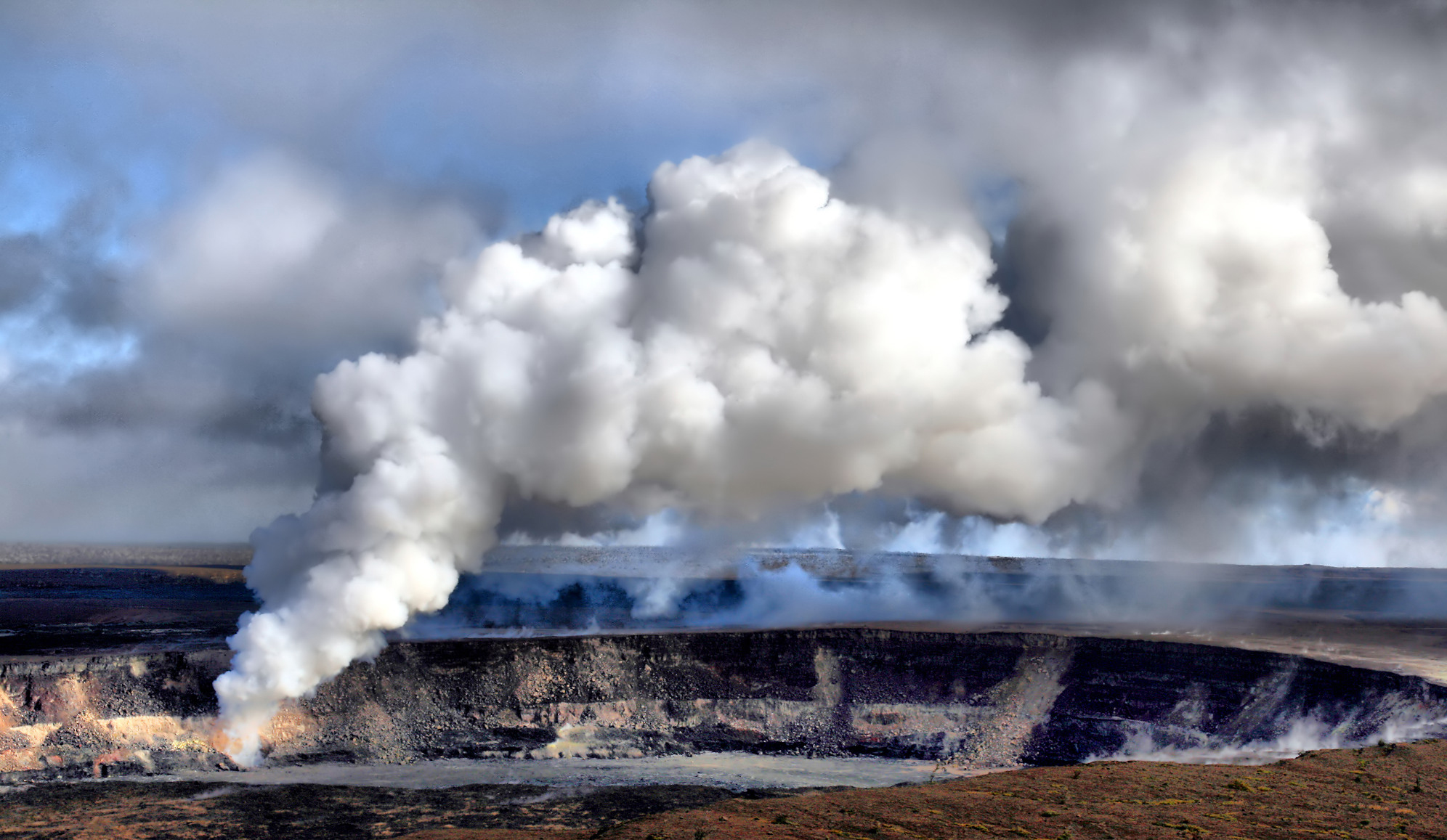
Several sites are within Hawaii Volcanoes National Park, a UNESCO World Heritage Site

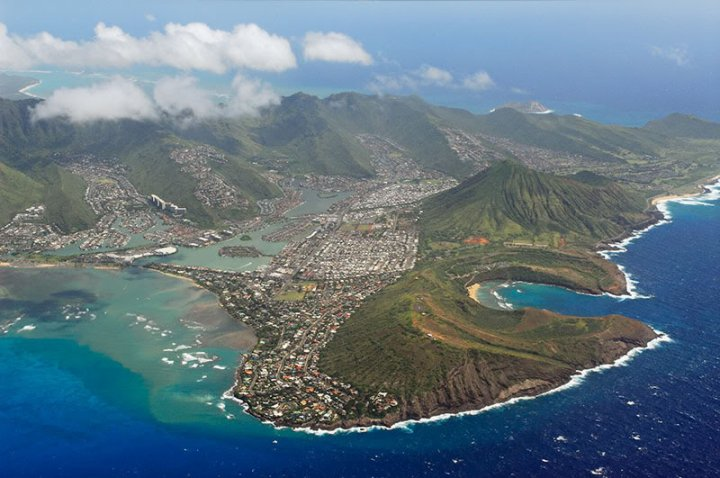
Aerial view of Hawaii Kai and Koko Head

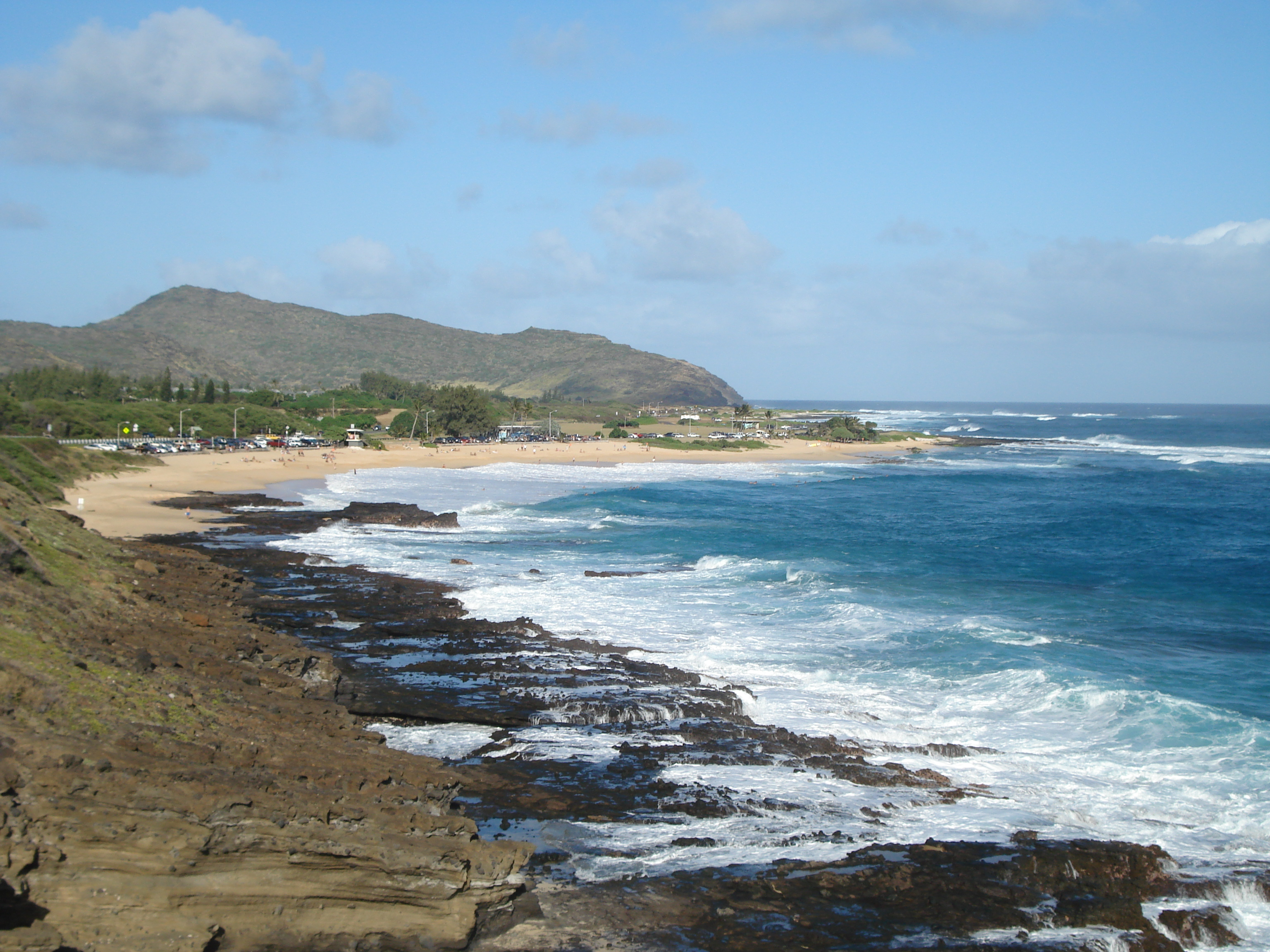
Sandy Beach, Hawaii

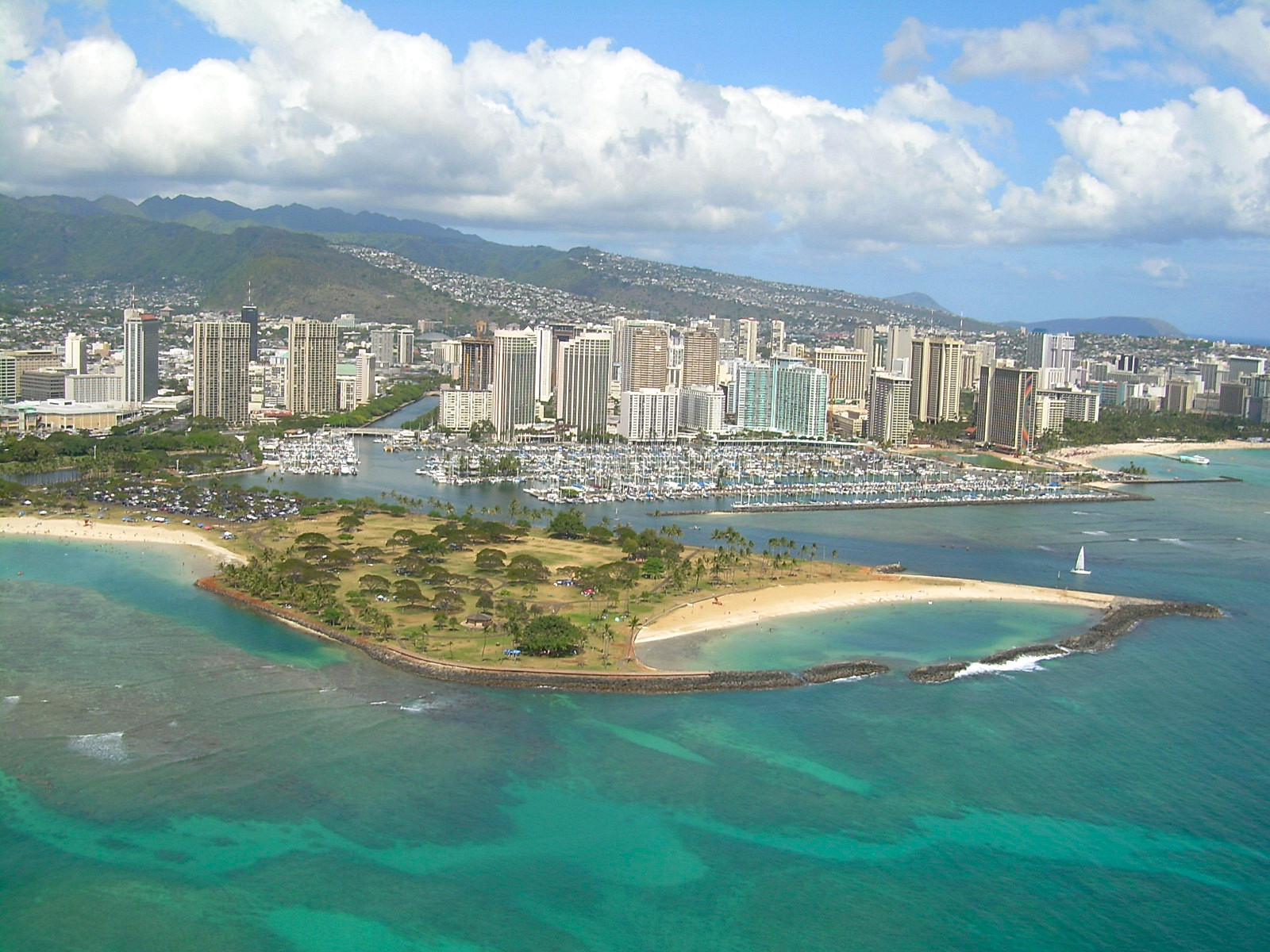
Aerial view of Magic Island, a manmade peninsula

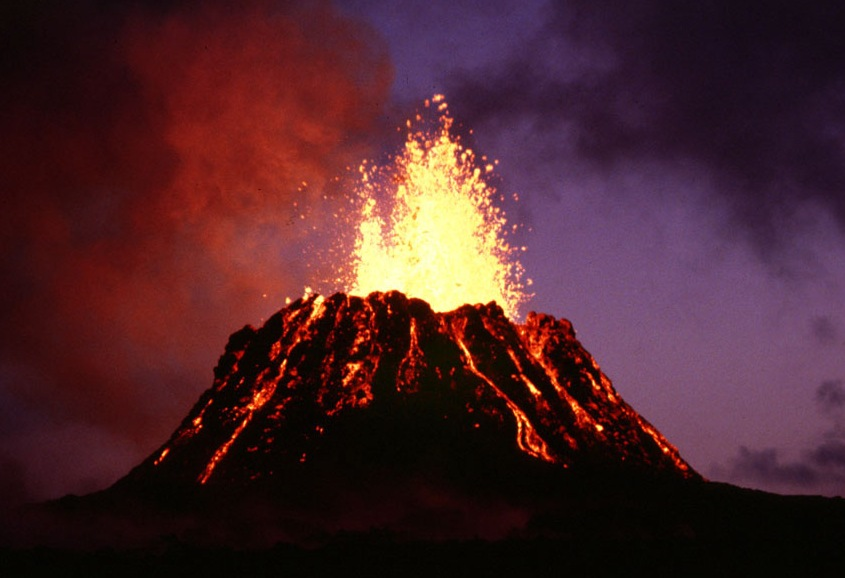
Puʻu ʻŌʻō at dusk, June 1983

Geography of Hawaii – Unlike the other states of the Union, Hawaii is a group of islands, located in the Pacific Ocean.

- Hawaii is: a U.S. state, a federal state of the United States of America
- Location
  - Northern Hemisphere
    - Pacific Ocean
      - North Pacific Ocean
        - Hawaiian Islands
    - United States
      - Western United States
  - Western Hemisphere
- Population of Hawaii: 1,455,271 (2020 U.S. Census)
- Area of Hawaii
- Atlas of Hawaii
- Places in Hawaii
  - Historic places
    - Archaeological sites in Hawaii
    - Ghost towns in Hawaii
    - National Historic Landmarks in Hawaii
    - National Register of Historic Places listings
      - Bridges on the National Register of Historic Places
  - National Natural Landmarks in Hawaii
  - Category:National Park Service areas in Hawaii
  - State parks in Hawaii

=== Environment of Hawaii ===
Environment of Hawaii

- Endemism in the Hawaiian Islands
- Environmental issues in Hawaii
- Climate of Hawaii
  - Global warming in Hawaii
- Geology
  - Hawaii hotspot
- Superfund sites in Hawaii
- Wildlife of Hawaii
  - Fauna of Hawaii
    - Birds of Hawaii
      - Endemic birds of Hawaii
    - Insects of Hawaii
      - Lepidoptera (butterflies and moths) of Hawaii
    - Invasive species in Hawaii

==== Geographic features of Hawaii ====
- Beaches of Hawaii
- Channels of the Hawaiian Islands
- Dams and reservoirs in Hawaii
- Leeward desert
- Manmade peninsula
- Mountain passes in Hawaii
- National Natural Landmarks in Hawaii
- Rivers of Hawaii
- Volcanoes of Hawaii
  - Evolution of Hawaiian volcanoes
- Wilderness area

==== Natural Area Reserves of Hawaii ====
- Ahihi-Kinau

==== Administrative divisions of Hawaii ====
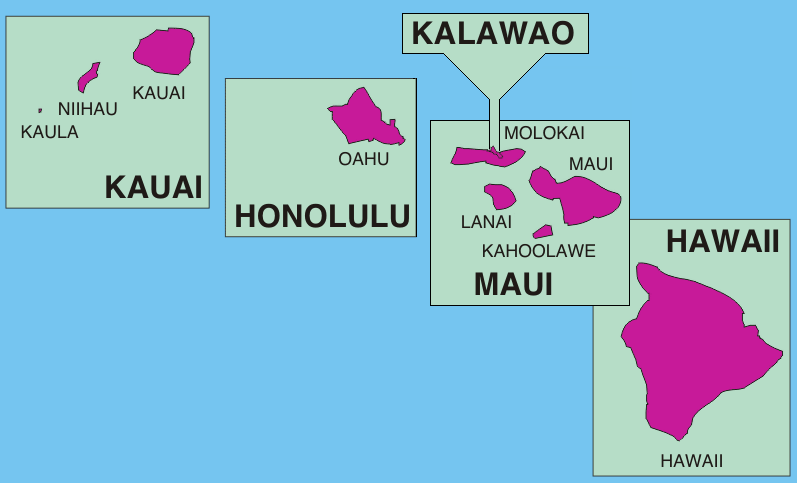
An enlargeable map of the five counties of the state of Hawaiʻi

- The five counties of the state of Hawaiʻi
- Communities in Hawaii
  - State capital of Hawaii: Honolulu (the 55th largest city in the United States)
  - City nicknames in Hawaii
  - Sister cities in Hawaii
  - Census-designated places in Hawaii

=== Demography of Hawaii ===
Demographics of Hawaii – Hawaii has a de facto population of over 1.4 million, due to large military and tourist populations.

- Ancient Hawaiian population
- Hawaii locations by per capita income

== Government and politics of Hawaii ==
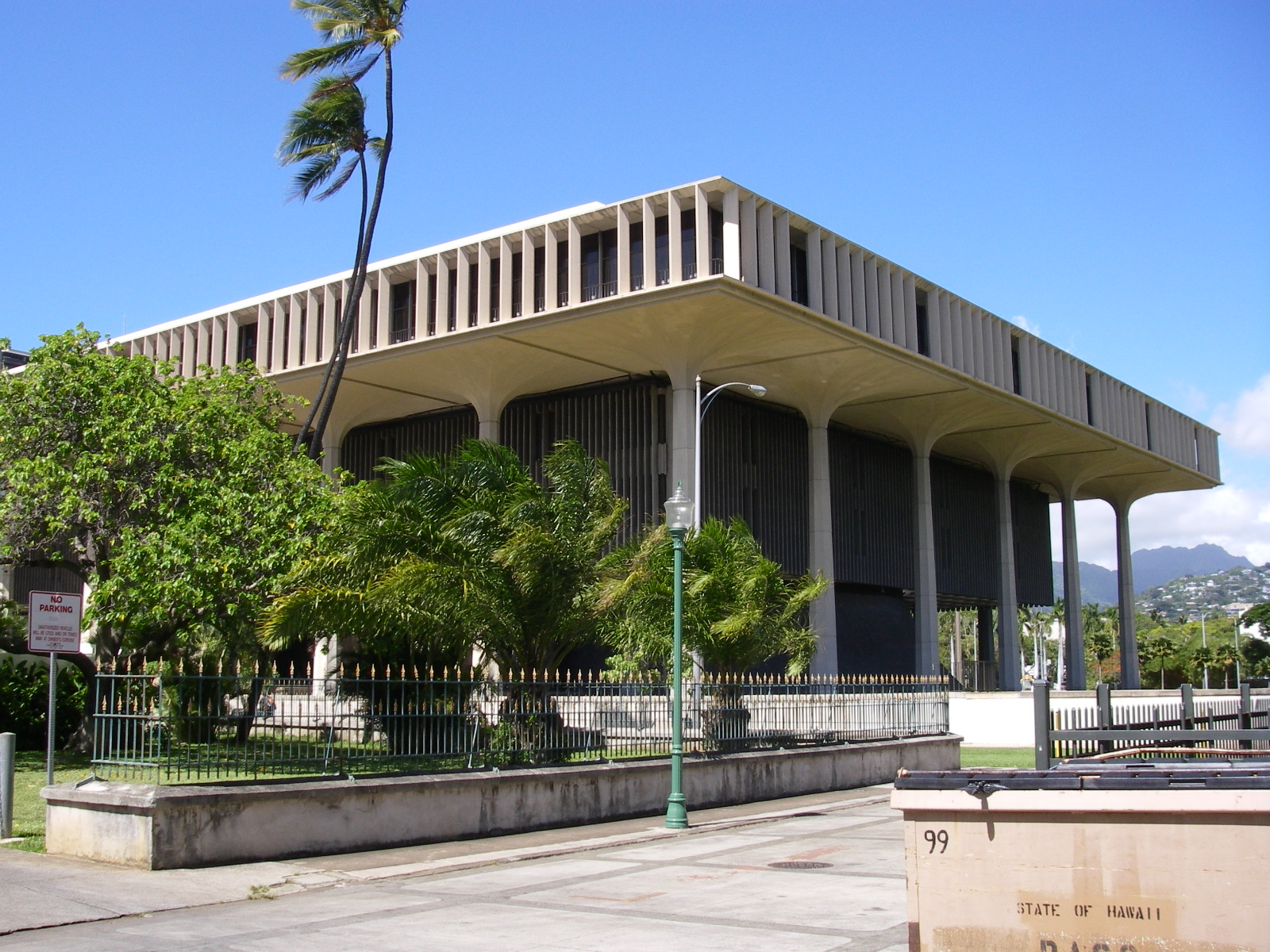
The Hawaii State Capitol from the southeast

Government and politics of Hawaii

- Form of government: U.S. state government
- Hawaii's congressional delegations
- Hawaii State Capitol
- Elections in Hawaii
  - Electoral reform in Hawaii
- Political party strength in Hawaii

=== Branches of the government of Hawaii ===
Government of Hawaii

==== Executive branch of the government of Hawaii ====
- Governor of Hawaii
  - Lieutenant Governor of Hawaii
  - Secretary of State of Hawaii
- State departments
  - Hawai'i Department of Education
  - Hawaii Department of Health
  - Hawaii Department of Human Services
  - Hawai'i Department of Land and Natural Resources
  - Hawaii Department of Public Safety
  - Hawaii Department of Transportation

==== Legislative branch of the government of Hawaii ====
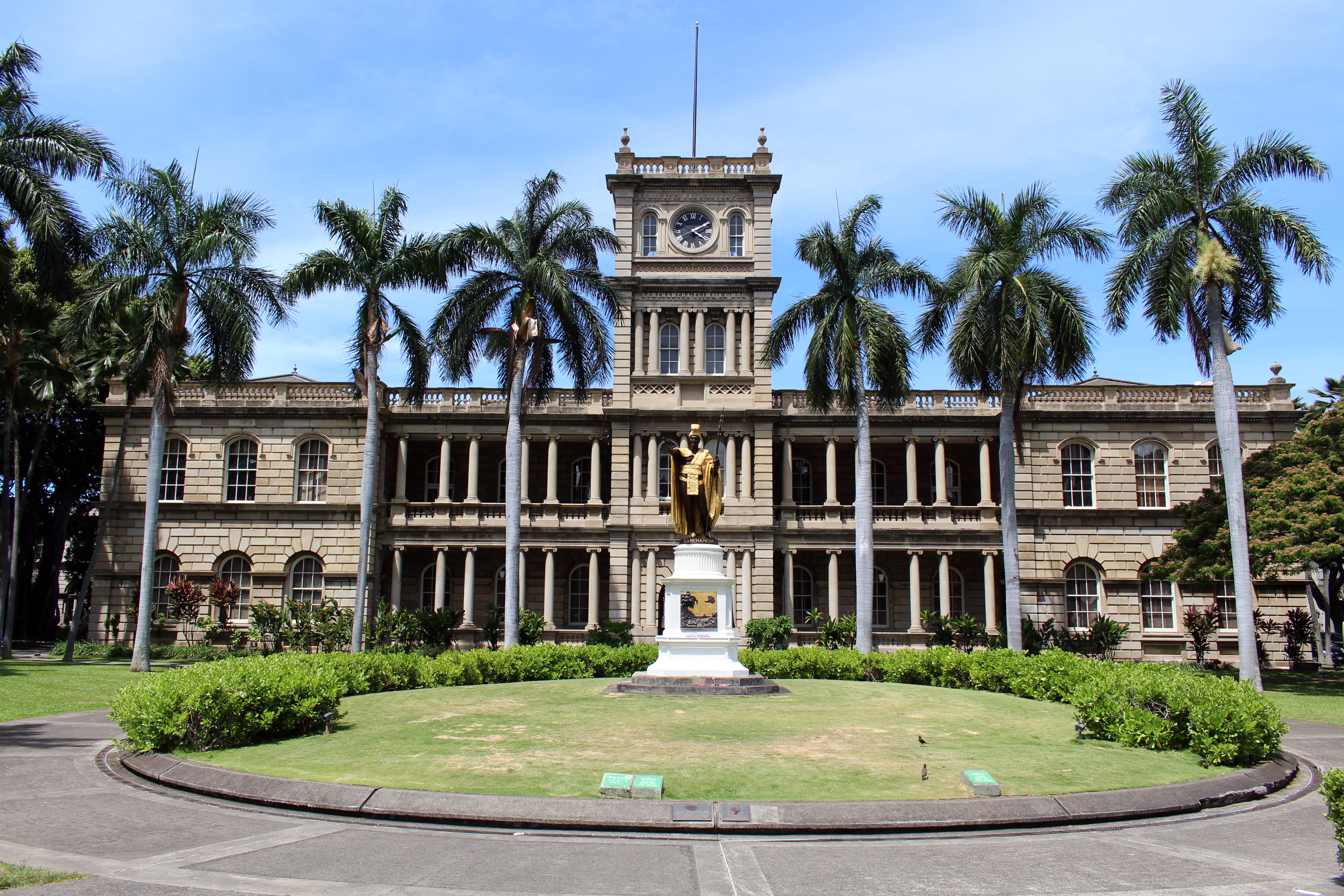
Aliʻiōlani Hale, the building where the Hawaii Supreme Court meets

- Hawaii State Legislature (bicameral)
  - Upper house: Hawaii State Senate
  - Lower house: Hawaii House of Representatives

==== Judicial branch of the government of Hawaii ====
- Courts of Hawaii
  - Supreme Court of Hawaii

=== Law and order in Hawaii ===
- Cannabis in Hawaii
- Capital punishment in Hawaii: none. Hawaii abolished the death penalty prior to statehood. See also Capital punishment in the United States.
- Constitution of Hawaii
- Crime in Hawaii
- Gun laws in Hawaii
- Law enforcement in Hawaii
  - Law enforcement agencies in Hawaii
  - State prisons of Hawaii
  - Legal status of Hawaii
- LGBT rights in Hawaii
  - Same-sex marriage in Hawaii

=== Military in Hawaii ===
- National Guard of Hawaii
  - Hawaii Air National Guard
  - Hawaii Army National Guard

== History of Hawaii ==
History of Hawaii

- Demographic history of Hawaii

=== History of Hawaii, by period ===
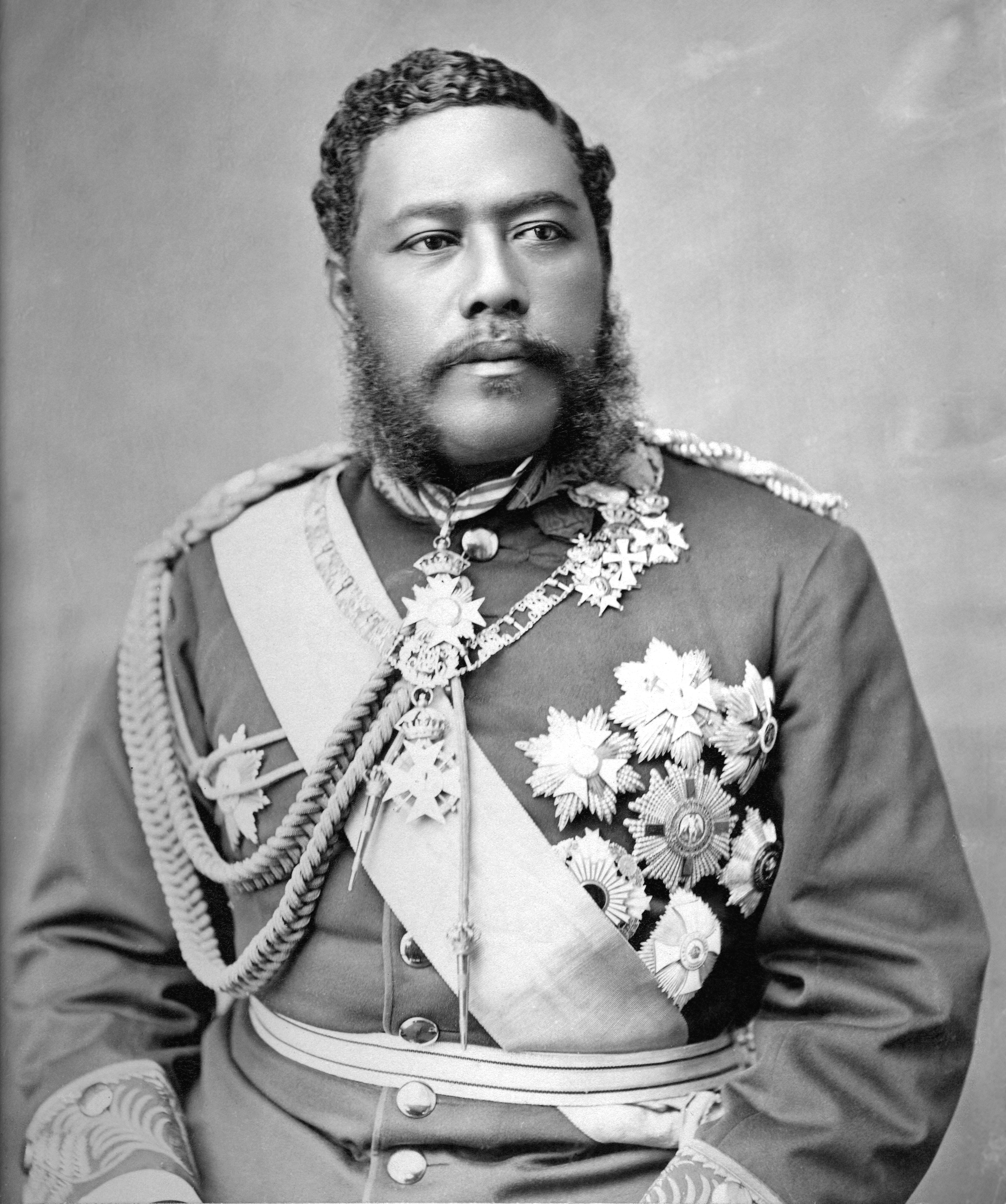
Kalākaua, the last king of the Kingdom of Hawaiʻi

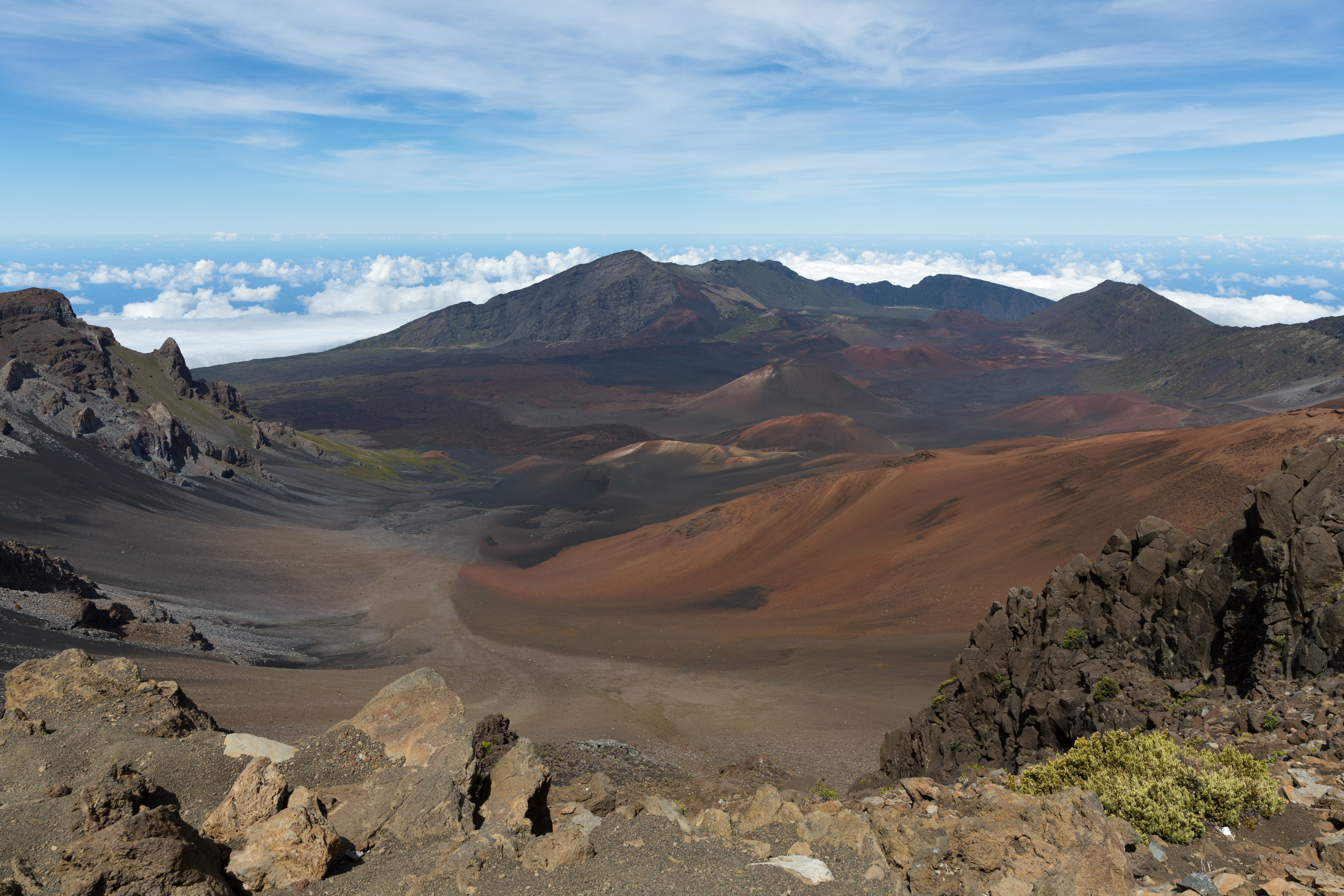
Haleakalā National Park, view at 9,740 feet (2,970 m)

- Ancient Hawaiʻi (before 1810)
- Kingdom of Hawaiʻi, 1810–1893
  - Kamehameha I, 1795–1819
  - Kamehameha II, 1819–1824
  - Kamehameha III, 1825–1854
  - Kamehameha IV, 1855–1863
  - Kamehameha V, 1863–1872
  - Lunalilo, 1873–1874
  - Kalākaua, 1874–1891
  - Liliʻuokalani, 1891–1893
  - Overthrow of the Kingdom of Hawaii
- Provisional Government of Hawaii, 1893–1894
  - Citizen's Committee of Public Safety, 1893–1894
- Republic of Hawaii, 1894–1898
  - Sanford Ballard Dole, 1894–1898
- Territory of Hawaii, 1898–1959
  - United States annexation, July 4, 1898
  - Hawaiian Organic Act of 1900
  - Hawaii National Park established on August 1, 1916
  - World War II, September 1, 1939 – September 2, 1945
    - Attack on Pearl Harbor, December 7, 1941
    - United States enters Second World War on December 8, 1941
- State of Hawaiʻi becomes 50th State admitted to the United States of America on August 21, 1959
  - Haleakala National Park designated on September 13, 1960
  - Hawaii National Park renamed Hawaii Volcanoes National Park on September 22, 1961
  - Hurricane Iniki, 1992

=== History of Hawaii, by region ===
- History of Hawaiʻi Island
- History of Maui
- History of Kahoʻolawe
- History of Lānaʻi
- History of Molokaʻi
- History of Oʻahu
- History of Kauaʻi
- History of Niʻihau
- History of Honolulu

=== History of Hawaii, by subject ===
- Constitution
- List of Hawaii state legislatures

== Culture of Hawaii ==
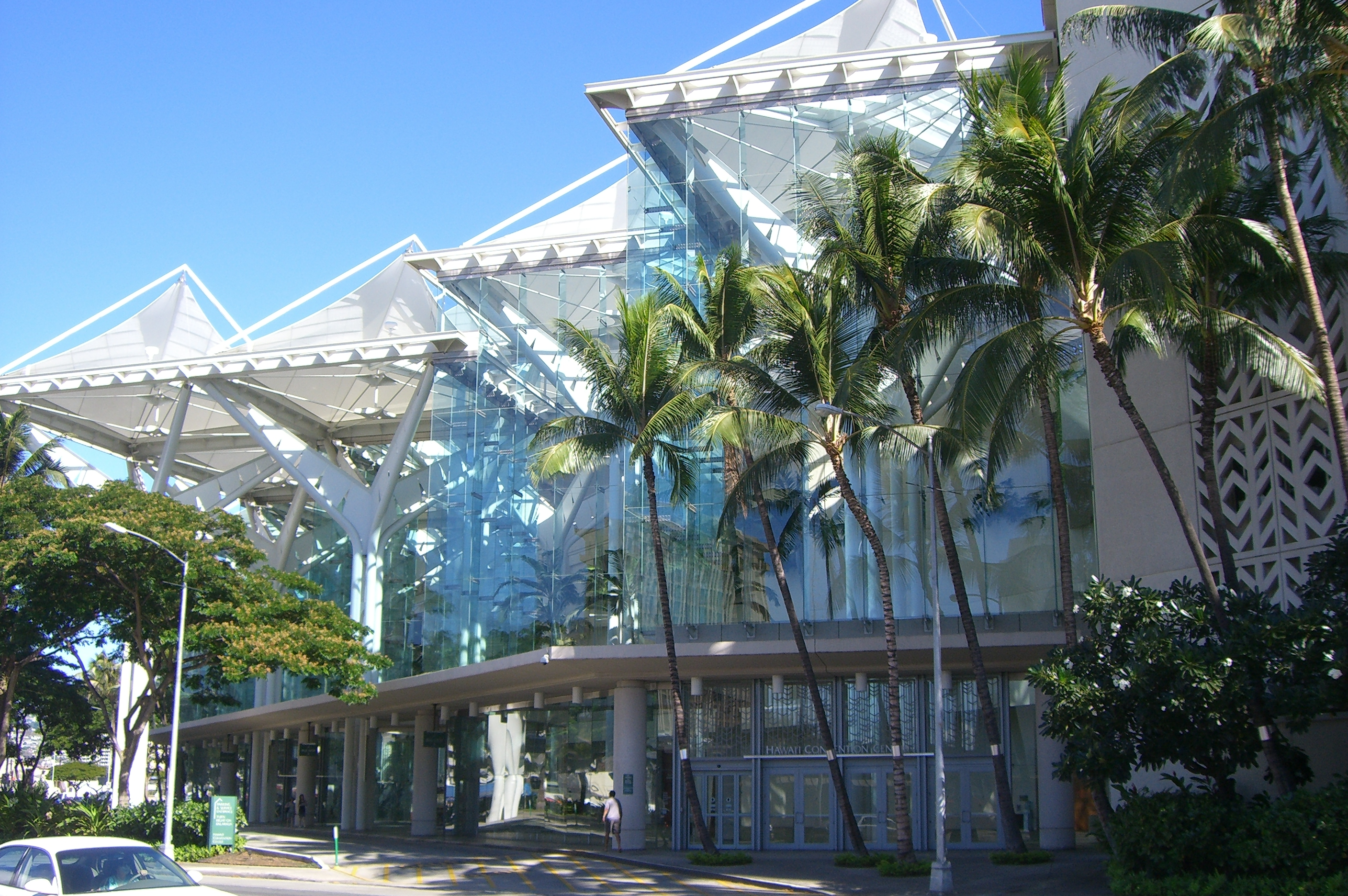
The Hawaii Convention Center building in Honolulu

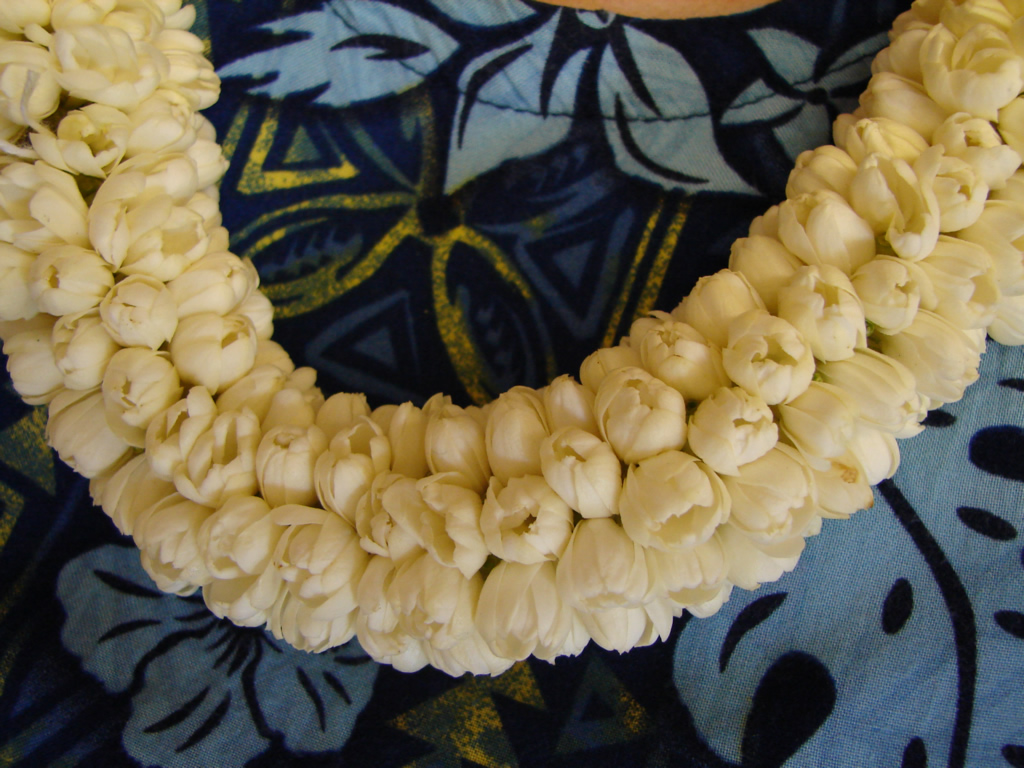
Aloha shirt and fragrant lei of fresh pikake (Arabian jasmine)

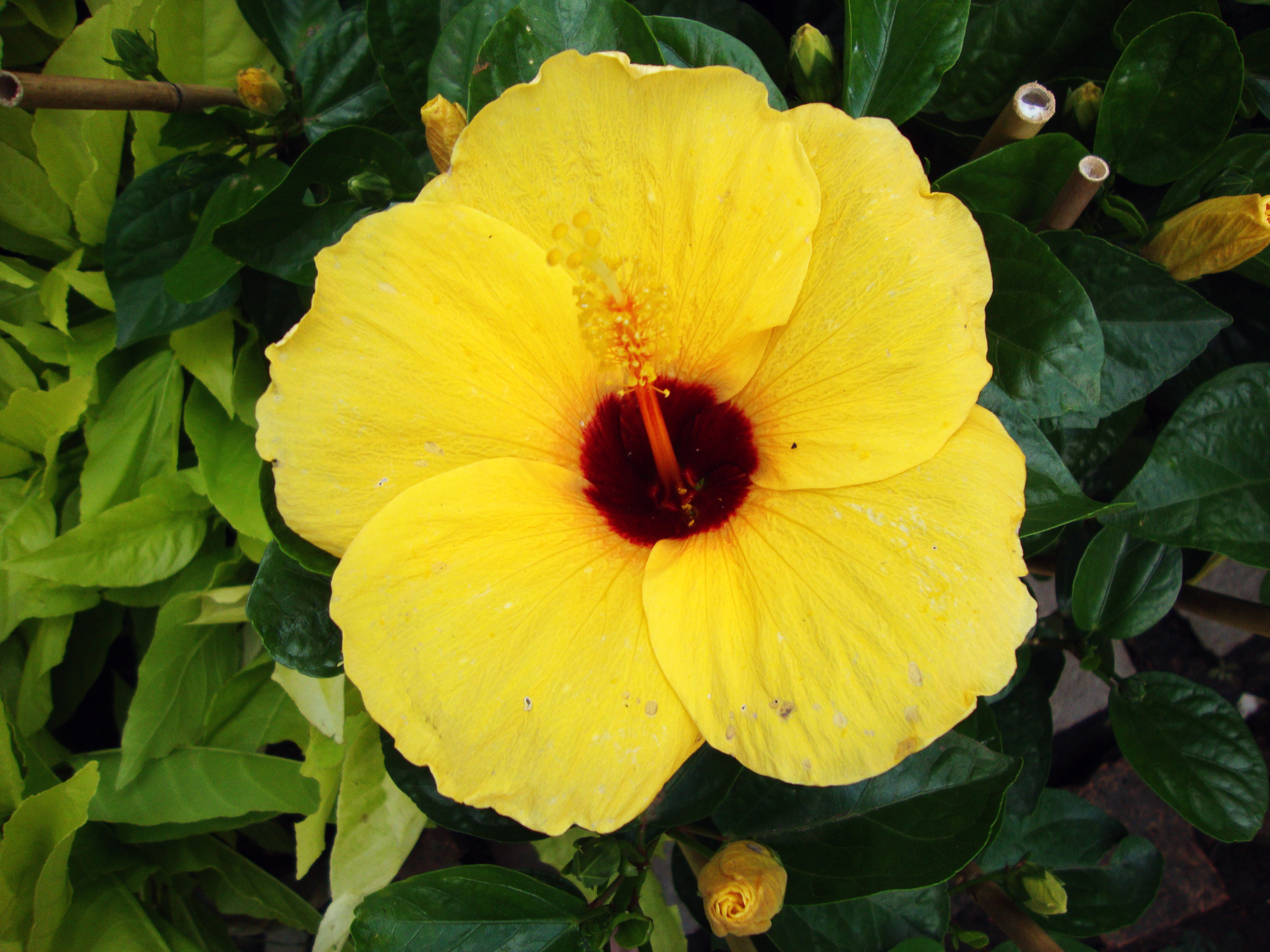
Hawaiian hibiscus (Hibiscus brackenridgei), the official state flower of Hawaii

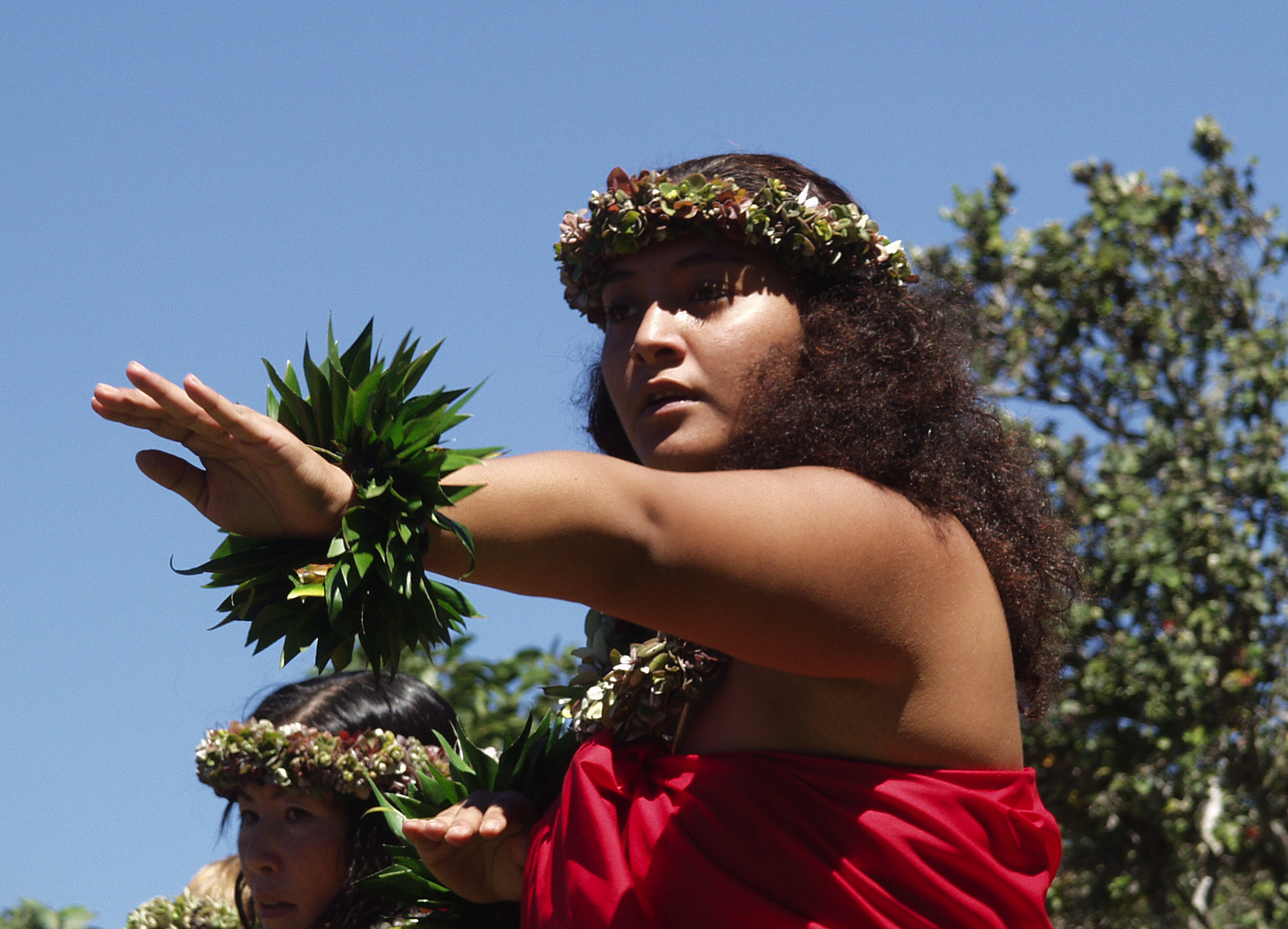
Hula kahiko performance in Hawaiʻi Volcanoes National Park

Culture of Hawaii – the aboriginal culture of Hawaii is Polynesian. Hawaii represents the northernmost extension of the vast Polynesian triangle of the south and central Pacific Ocean. While traditional Hawaiian culture remains only as vestiges in modern Hawaiian society, there are reenactments of the ceremonies and traditions throughout the islands.

- Hawaiian architecture
  - Tallest buildings in Honolulu
- Cuisine of Hawaii
  - Hawaiian dishes
  - Breweries in Hawaii
  - Restaurants in Hawaii
  - Wine in Hawaii
- Culture of the Native Hawaiians
- Customs and etiquette in Hawaii
  - Aloha greeting
  - Aloha shirt
  - Lei (garland)
  - Shaka sign
- Folklore in Hawaii
- Holidays in Hawaii
  - Christmas in Hawaii
- Museums in Hawaii
- Orders, decorations, and medals of Hawaii
- People of Hawaii
  - Native Hawaiians
    - Hawaiian home land
  - Africans in Hawaii
  - Asian immigration to Hawaii
    - Chinese in Hawaii
    - Filipinos in Hawaii
    - Japanese in Hawaii
  - Greeks in Hawaii
- Scouting in Hawaii
- State symbols of Hawaii
  - Flag of the State of Hawai'i (Hawaii)
  - Official state flower
  - State Great Seal of the State of Hawai'i

=== The Arts in Hawaii ===
- Art of Hawaii
- Dance
- Music of Hawaii
  - Hawaii Opera Theatre

== Religion in Hawaii ==
Religion in Hawaii

- Hawaiian Religion
- Islam in Hawaii
- Christianity in Hawaii
  - The Church of Jesus Christ of Latter-day Saints in Hawaii
  - Christmas in Hawaii
  - Eastern Catholic Community in Hawaii
  - Episcopal Diocese of Hawaii
  - Orthodox Church in Hawaii
    - Orthodox parishes in Hawaii

== Economy and infrastructure of Hawaii ==
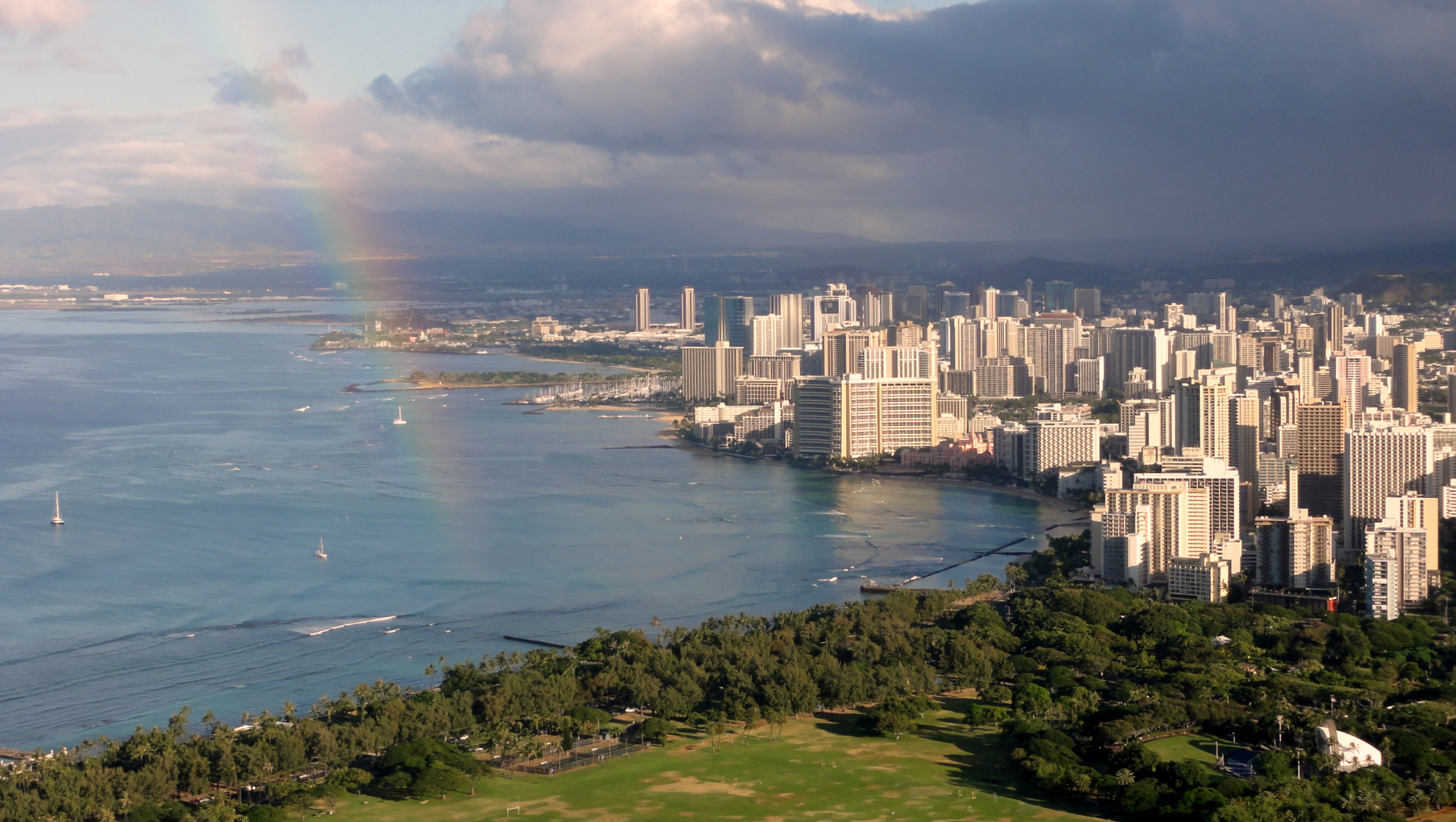
Honolulu viewed from Diamond Head

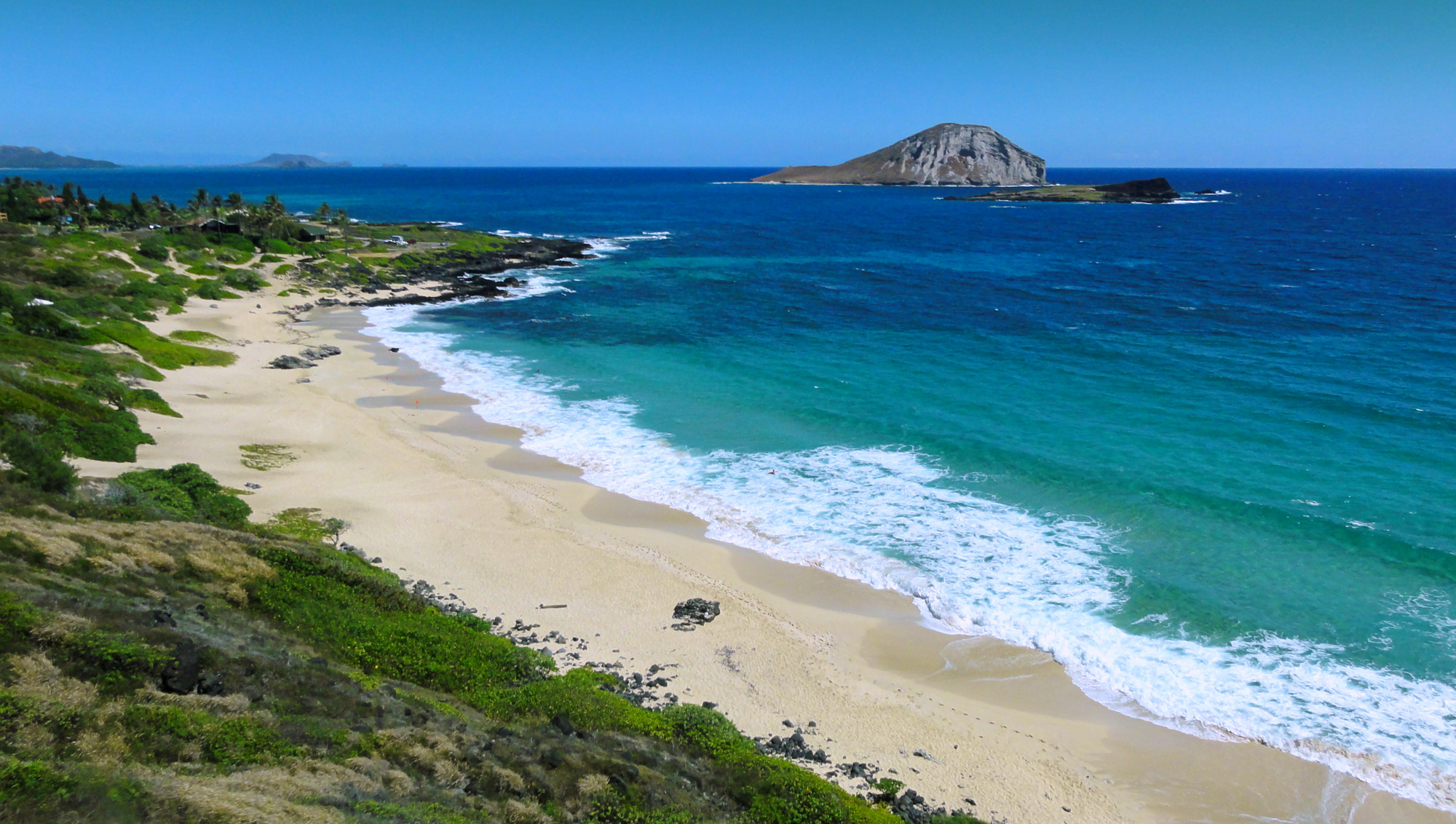
Makapuʻu Beach

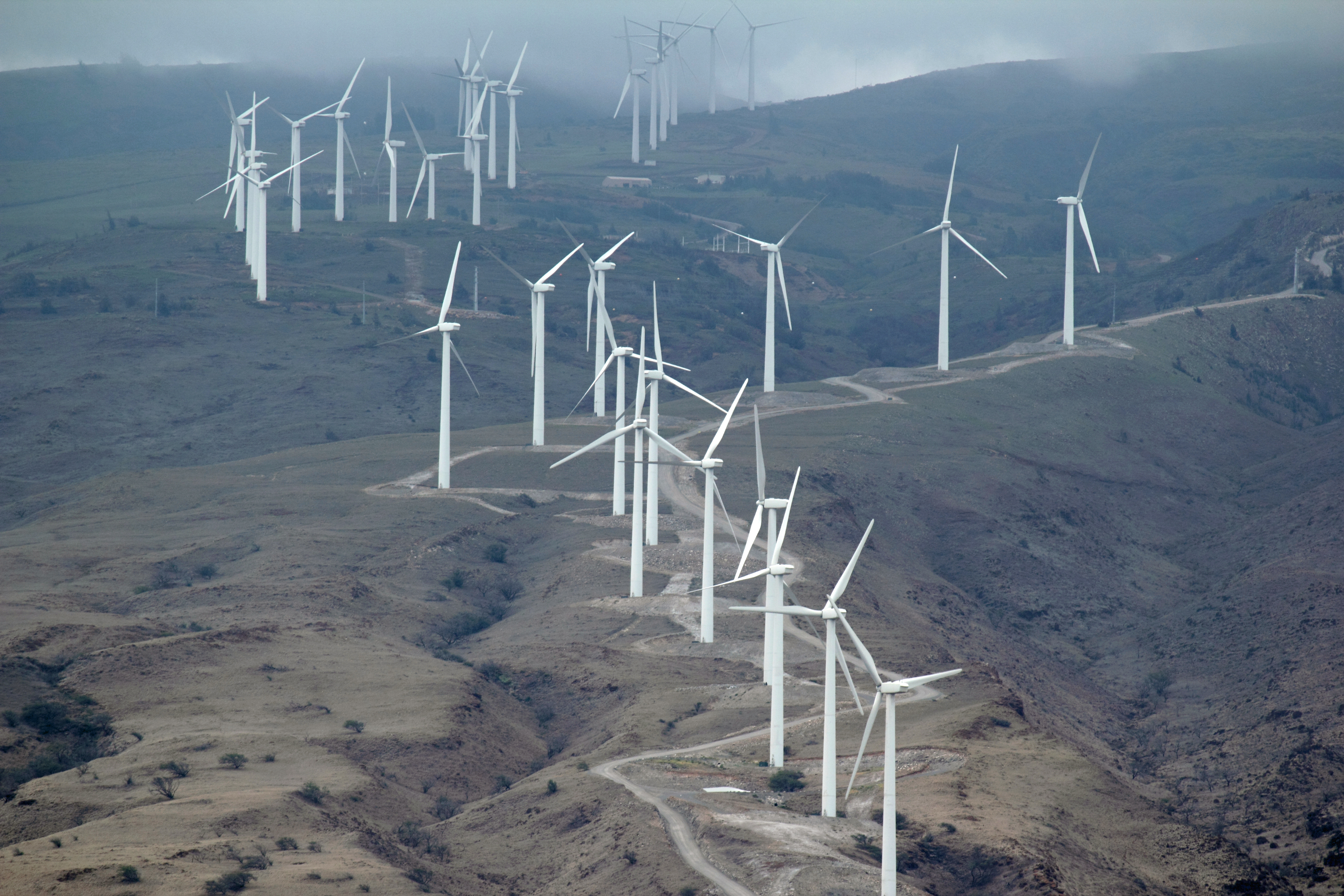
Kaheawa Wind Power wind farm

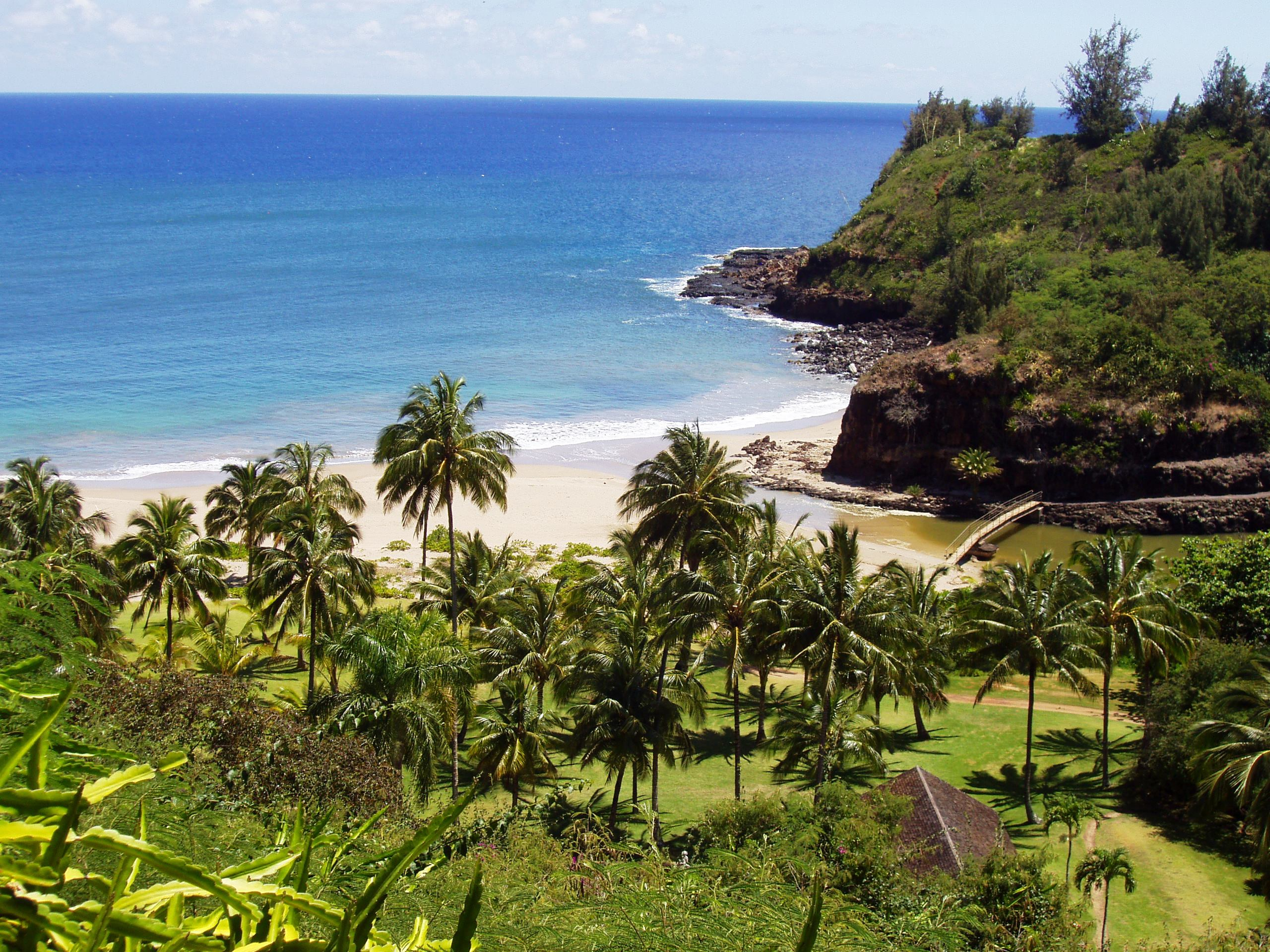
Allerton Garden, view from above

Economy of Hawaii

- Agriculture in Hawaii
  - Breweries in Hawaii
  - Coffee production in Hawaii
    - Kona coffee
  - Hawaii wine
  - Genetic engineering in Hawaii
  - Macadamia nut
  - Sugar plantations in Hawaii
- Banking
  - Bank of Hawaii
  - Hawaii National Bank
- Communications in Hawaii
  - Telephone Area Code: 808
- Currency of Hawaii: Hawaiian dollar
  - Coins of the Hawaiian dollar
- Energy in Hawaii
  - Power stations in Hawaii
  - Solar power in Hawaii
  - Wind power in Hawaii
- Health care in Hawaii
  - Hospitals in Hawaii
- Media in Hawaii
  - Film and television in Hawaii
    - Television stations in Hawaii
  - Newspapers in Hawaii
  - Radio stations in Hawaii
- Media in Honolulu
- Tourism in Hawaii
  - Visa policy of the United States
- Transportation in Hawaii
  - Aviation in Hawaii
    - Airports in Hawaii
  - Railroads in Hawaii
  - State highways in Hawaii

== Education in Hawaii ==
Education in Hawaii

- Libraries in Hawaii
  - Carnegie libraries in Hawaii
- Schools in Hawaii
  - School districts in Hawaii
    - High schools in Hawaii
    - Colleges and universities in Hawaii
      - University of Hawaii

== See also ==
- Topic overview:
  - Hawaii
  - Index of Hawaii-related articles
