= Mary Lambert =

Mary Lambert may refer to:

- Mary Lambert (director) (born 1951), American film and television director
- Mary Lambert (singer) (born 1989), American singer-songwriter
- Mary Lambert Jones, birth name of Mary Dominis (1803–1889), American settler of Hawaii
