= Eastern Catholic Community in Hawaii =

The Eastern Catholic Community in Hawaiʻi encompasses all Catholics of the Eastern Catholic Churches. It is based in Honolulu, Hawaiʻi.

== History ==
Eastern Catholics from western Ukraine began arriving in 1897, as part of a wave of emigration from the Austro-Hungarian Empire. However these were often ensnared into indentured servitude on sugar plantations in Hawaii, and were not able to develop their own churches. Ukrainian Catholic, Orthodox, and Jewish clergy in mainland North America pressured the San Francisco Chronicle to investigate, and on July 24, 1899 the newspaper's headline blared "Slavery in Hawaii Under the American Flag". Once freed, many of the Ukrainians departed for Canada, where there was a larger wave of Ukrainian settlement and many had relatives.

In 1975, the community began meeting for Divine Liturgy at St. Anthony Roman Catholic Church, Kalihi Kai, Honolulu with the late Reverend Archimandrite Jules C. E. Riotte, Episcopal vicar for the Eastern Rite. The community subsequently met at Saint Sophia Chapel in Waiʻanae, with Reverend Philip Harmon as its pastor.

On October 29, 2005, Most Reverend Richard Stephen Seminack, Eparch of the Ukrainian Catholic Eparchy of Saint Nicholas in Chicago visited Hawaiʻi, announced the retirement of Father Harmon, the move of the parish to Kuliʻouʻou, and the grant of bi-ritual eparchial faculties to Reverend Halbert Weidner, C.O., pastor of Holy Trinity Church. Bishop Seminack installed Father Weidner as the pastor of Saint Sophia Ukrainian Greek Catholic mission parish.

The Ukrainian church is no longer at 5919 Kalanianaole Hwy., Honolulu, Hawaii since 2011. St. Sophia UGCC Mission serves the Divine Liturgy on the 2d and 4th Sundays at St. Elizabeth of Hungary Roman Catholic Church in Aiea.

While ritually similar, the Eastern Catholic Community of Hawaii is distinct from the Eastern Orthodox Communities of Hawaii.

== See also ==
- Roman Catholic Diocese of Honolulu
- Orthodox Church in Hawaii
