= Christmas in Hawaii =

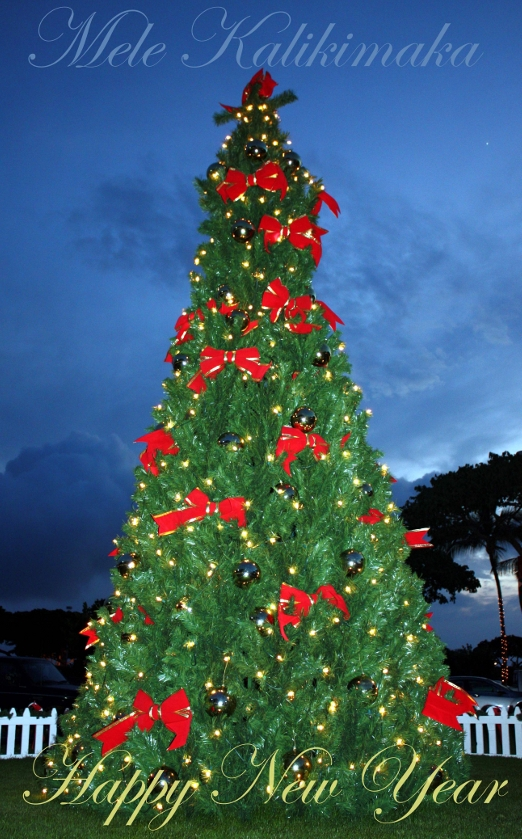
Hawaiian Christmas tree postcard

Christmas in Hawaii is a major annual celebration, as in most of the Western world.

== History ==
This festival was introduced to Hawaii with the arrival of Protestant missionaries, and is believed to have started after 1820. Most of the traditions they currently celebrate come from the missionaries. Before the Hawaiians celebrated the Christmas people know today, they had a festival named Makahiki which lasted around four months and in which all wars were forbidden. The season still had the essence of "peace and goodwill to all men", which is another thing people tend to associate with Christmas.

The first recorded Christmas in Hawaii was in 1786, when the captain of merchant ship the Queen Charlotte, George Dixon, was docked on the Hawaiian island of Kauai. Dixon and his crew celebrated a large Christmas dinner that included a whole roast pig.

King Kamehameha IV and Queen Emma of Hawaii officially celebrated Christmas in 1856 as a day of Thanksgiving. On Christmas Eve of 1858 Mary Dominis threw a party at Washington Place featuring the first instance of a Christmas tree and Santa Claus in Hawaii. King Kamehameha IV declared it an official holiday in 1862.

== Celebrations today ==
The annual Honolulu City Lights ceremony features a 50-foot Norfolk pine Christmas tree decorated with bright lights and elaborate decorations. There is also live entertainment. Another annual celebration is the Festival of Lights held during December in Lihue, Kauai.

The traditions on Christmas day are similar to other places; a large meal is eaten and then, as the beach is often nearby in Hawaii, surfing or swimming often takes place in the waters, and musical groups with guitars and ukuleles and dancing hula entertain the crowds on the beach. Santa hats are worn and the traditional Santa's sleigh and reindeer are replaced by an outrigger canoe pulled by dolphins. The different cultures and ethnic groups that have settled in the islands celebrate the Christmas traditions of Hawaii in their own unique ways, which may be religious or plainly secular. Even Santa Claus (Hawaiian: Kanakaloka) himself is not wearing his corporate red and white suit, but has swapped it for flowery Hawaiian clothes.

Christmas wreaths are made from the poinsettia plant.

== Mele Kalikimaka ==
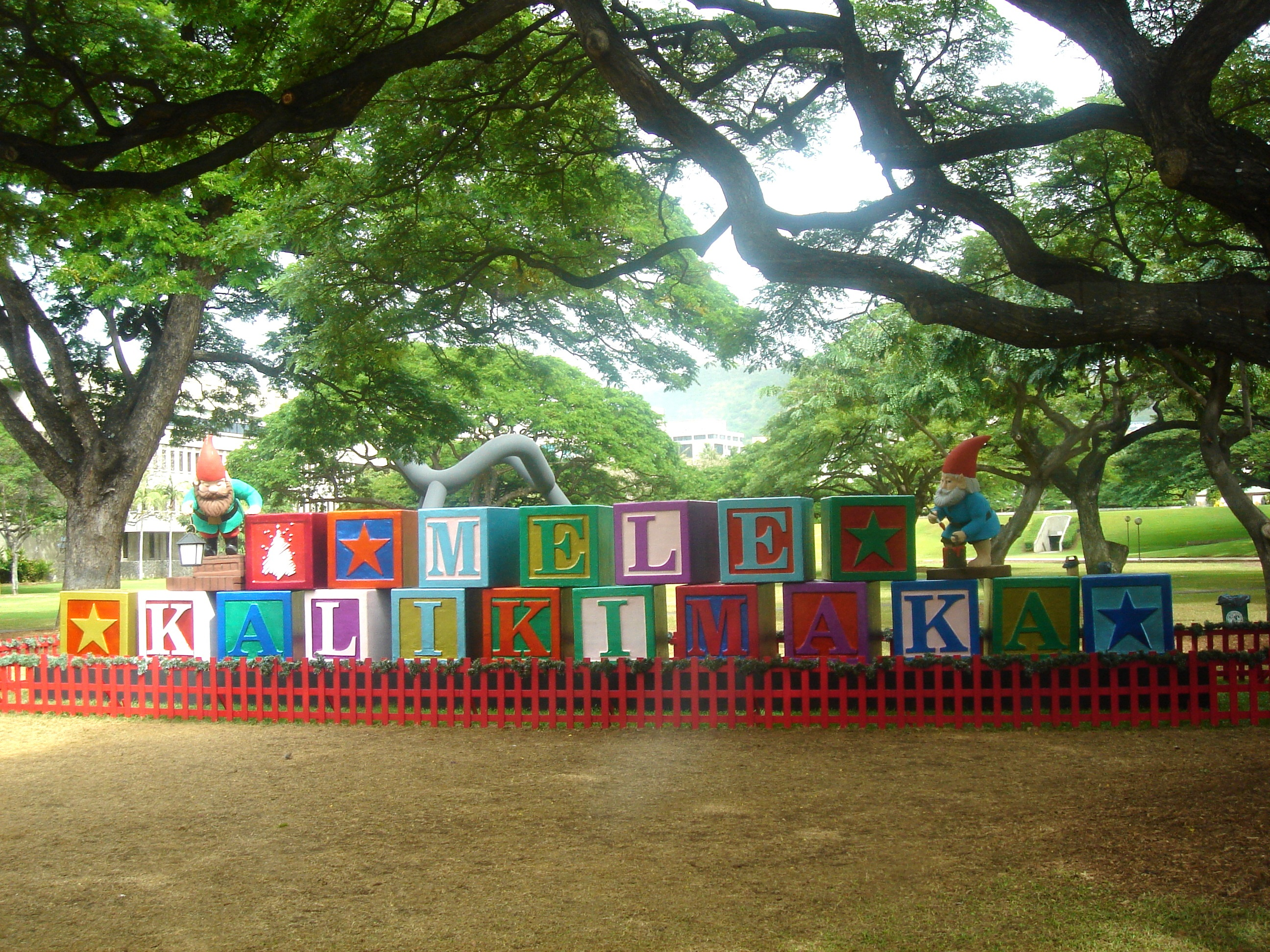
Mele Kalikimaka

The phrase "Mele Kalikimaka" can be translated from Hawaiian to mean "Merry Christmas". It is also a Hawaiian themed Christmas song composed by Robert Alex Anderson in 1949. The phrase is borrowed directly from English, but, since Hawaiian has a different phonological system (in particular, Hawaiian does not possess the /r/ or /s/ of English, nor does it have the phonotactic constraints to allow consonants at the end of a syllable), "Merry Christmas" becomes "Mele Kalikimaka".

There is also a more modern take on this song, called "Melekalikimaka" by rock band The Beach Boys from the compilation album Ultimate Christmas.

== Popular culture ==
- Sjömansjul på Hawaii (song about Hawaii at Christmastime)
