= Festival of Lights (Hawaii) =

Annual American event in Lihue, Kauai

Coordinates: 21.975125°N 159.3695021°W

The Festival of Lights is an annual celebration held during December in Līhuʻe, Kauaʻi.

The Festival of Lights was started by Josie Chansky in Lihue, Hawaii, in 1954 as a way of celebrating Christmas by using recycled materials as ornaments and decorations in her home. In 1996, the tradition was continued by Elizabeth Freeman, who had purchased Chansky's decorations at a garage sale and displayed them at Kauaʻi's Historic County Building in 1997 during the Christmas holiday.

As the Festival of Lights’ Creator and Art Director, Freeman has produced the event to showcase "Kauaʻi-style" decorations crafted by volunteers, as well as the late Auntie Josie Chansky's unique "folk art" creations. Freeman's most recognized themed trees include "Spam", "Hula Bear", "Kilauea Lighthouse", "Peacock" and the nationally recognized "Aloha Recycled Treasures", which is made from plastic water bottles. Other recent additions include the "If Can, Can" tree with recycled aluminum can ornaments and a dazzling "CD" tree with recycled CDs from S.C.R.A.P. (Scrounger's Center for Reusable Art Parts) in San Francisco, and the "Lure of the Sea" tree, decorated with ornaments of embossed recycled aluminum cans and recycled containers. New in 2015 was the "Over the Rainbow Tree", decorated with colorful flowers and butterflies created from recycled aluminum cans and water bottles.
