= Electoral reform in Hawaii =

Electoral reform in Hawaii refers to efforts, proposals and plans to change the election and voting laws in the Aloha State.

== Ballot access ==
On April 9, 2005, the Governor of Hawaii signed HB119, which eases the requirement that every signature on a petition must include the signer's social security number; now only the last 4 digits need be included.

== Allocation of electoral votes ==
In 2007, the Hawaii State Legislature passed legislation to join the National Popular Vote Interstate Compact but it was vetoed by Hawaii Governor Linda Lingle. She stated, "Hawaii's electoral votes would be awarded in a manner that may not reflect the will of the majority of the voters in Hawaii." The Hawaii Senate overrode her veto but the Hawaii House of Representatives failed to do so, and the bill died.

The legislation subsequently passed over her veto in the next (2008) session of the legislature.
