= List of National Natural Landmarks in Hawaii =

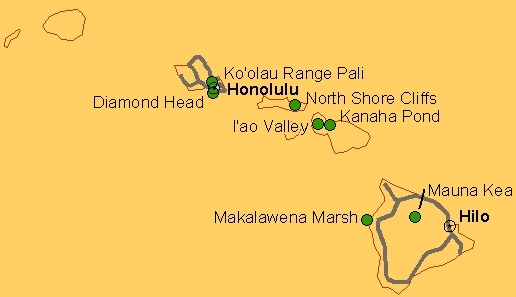
Locations within Hawaii

These are the National Natural Landmarks in the U.S. state of Hawaii.

Name	Image	Date	Location	County	Ownership	Description
Diamond Head			Honolulu	Oʻahu	State Monument	Towering volcanic tuff cone, overlooking Honolulu.
ʻĪao Valley			Wailuku	Maui	State Monument	Eroded volcanic pinnacles covered in vegetation and surrounded by a lush rain forest.
Kanahā Pond		June 1971	Kahului	Maui	State Wildlife Sanctuary	A brackish water bird refuge.
Koʻolau Range Pali				Oʻahu	State & private land	Faulted, eroded mountain range is the remnant of a shield volcano.
Makalawena Marsh		June 1972	North Kona	Hawaiʻi	State Park	Located in Kekaha Kai State Park, site supports endangered birds such as the Hawaiian stilt.
Mauna Kea		November 1972	Saddle Road	Hawaiʻi	Federal & state land	11,000 foot mountain is the world's finest example of a shield volcano.
North Shore Cliffs		December 1972	Molokaʻi	Maui	State & private lands	Contains steep, eroded volcanic cliffs.

== See also ==
- List of National Historic Landmarks in Hawaii
