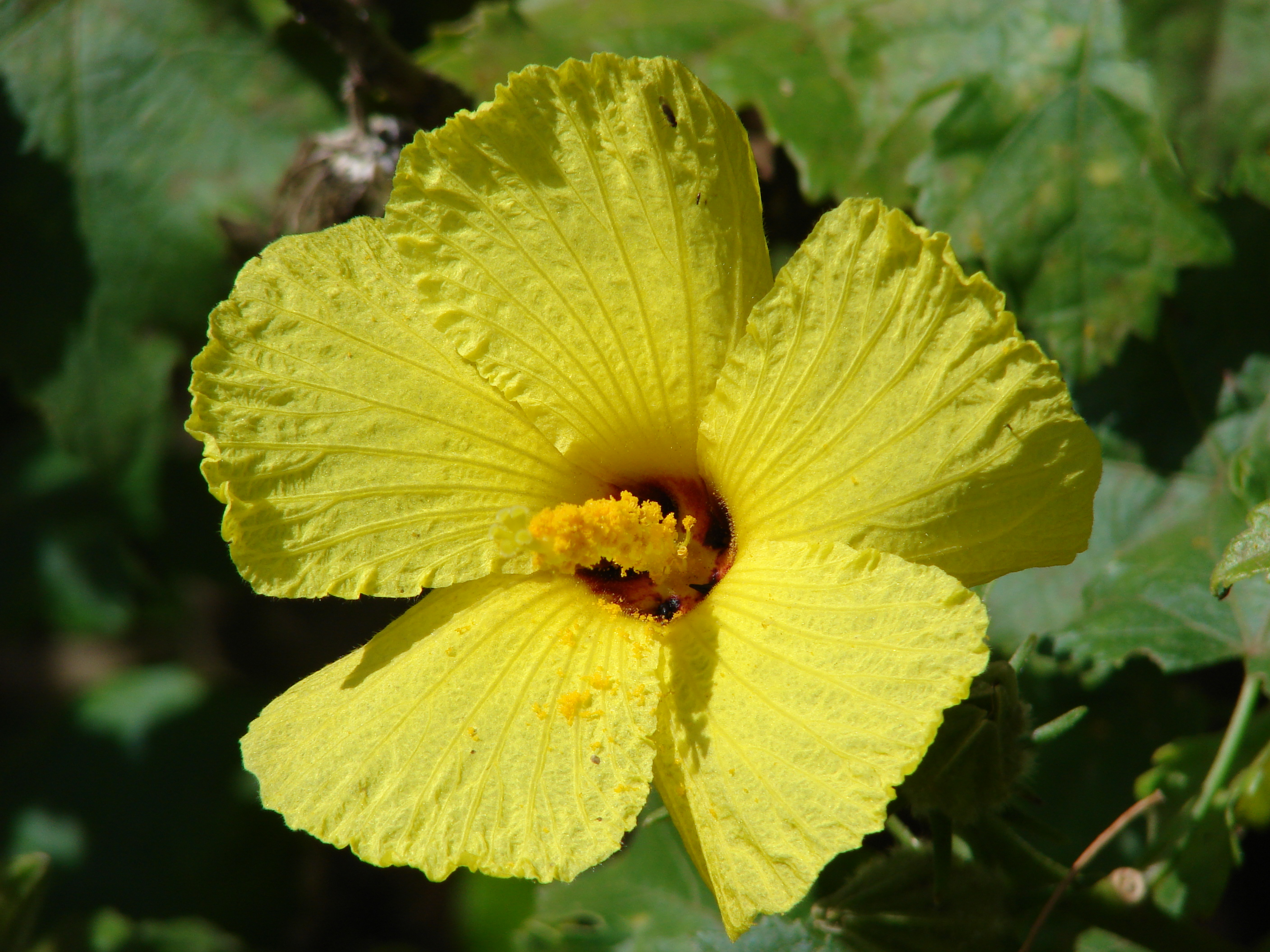
- Hibiscus brackenridgei subsp. brackenridgei

Conservation status
- Critically Endangered (IUCN 3.1)

Scientific classification
- Kingdom: Plantae
- Clade: Tracheophytes
- Clade: Angiosperms
- Clade: Eudicots
- Clade: Rosids
- Order: Malvales
- Family: Malvaceae
- Genus: Hibiscus
- Species: H. brackenridgei

Binomial name
- Hibiscus brackenridgei A.Gray

Subspecies
- Hibiscus brackenridgei subsp. brackenridgei; Hibiscus brackenridgei subsp. mokuleianus (M.J.Roe) D.M.Bates; Hibiscus brackenridgei subsp. molokaianus (Rock ex Caum) F.D.Wilson

= Hibiscus brackenridgei =

Species of flowering plant

Hibiscus brackenridgei is a species of flowering plant in the family Malvaceae. It is an upright shrub or small tree native to the Hawaiian Islands. It grows up to five meters tall and has bright yellow flowers. It is native to lowland Hawaiian dry forest and shrubland up to 350 meters elevation on the islands of Hawaii, Lanai, Maui, Molokai, and Oahu. The species is threatened by habitat loss and degradation from invasive non-native plant species, and predation and habitat degradation by non-native animals including pigs, deer, and goats.

Three subspecies are accepted.

- Hibiscus brackenridgei subsp. brackenridgei
- Hibiscus brackenridgei subsp. mokuleianus (M.J.Roe) D.M.Bates – Molokai and Oahu
- Hibiscus brackenridgei subsp. molokaianus (Rock ex Caum) F.D.Wilson – western Molokai and Oahu (extinct)
