= Holy Trinity Catholic Church (Honolulu) =

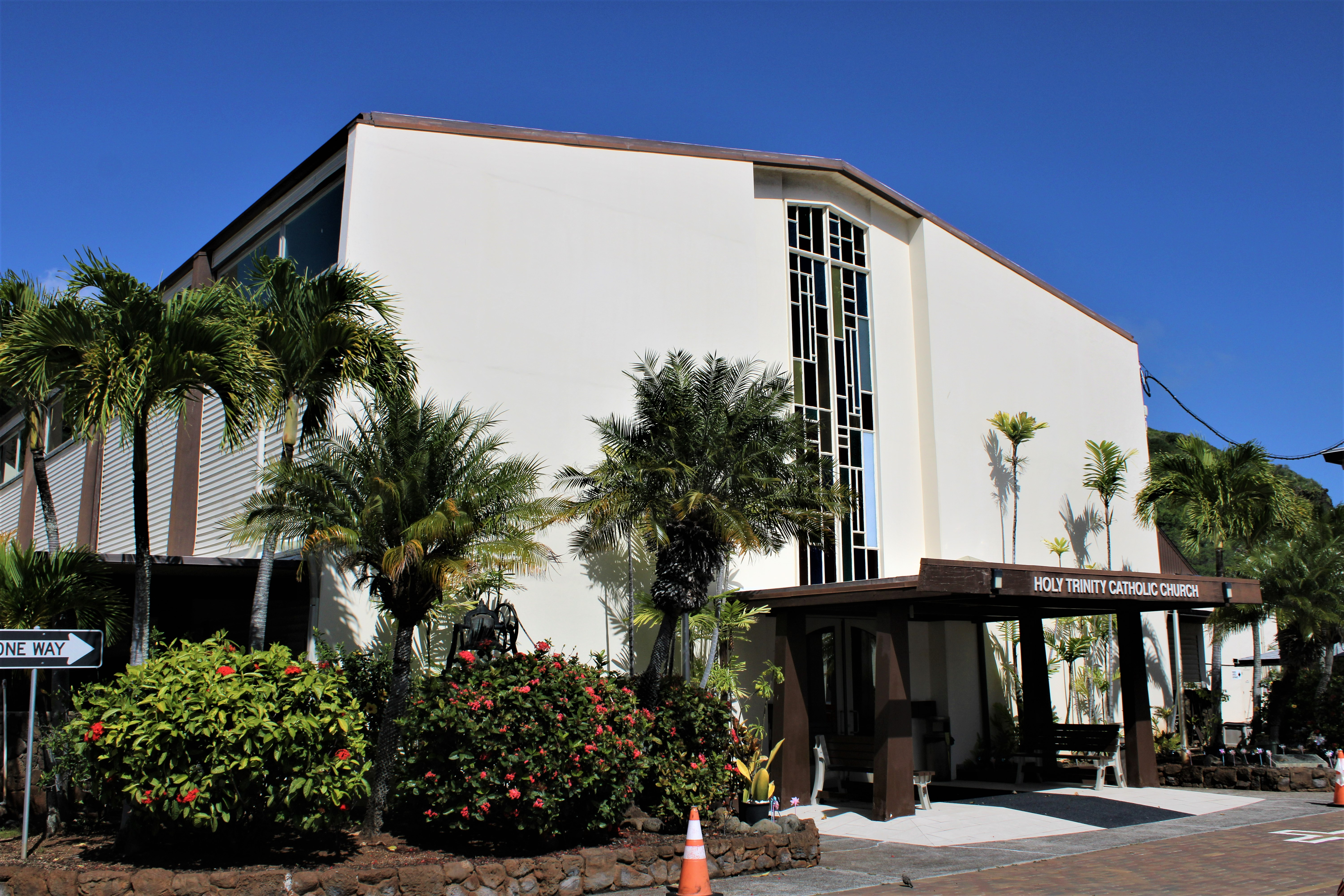
- Holy Trinity Church
- Holy Trinity Catholic Church
- 21°16′59″N 157°43′45″W
- Address: 5919 Kalanianaole Highway, Honolulu, Hawaii
- Country: USA
- Denomination: Roman Catholic
- Website: www.holytrinitychurchhi.org

History
- Founded: 1838
- Dedicated: January 8, 1939

Architecture
- Architect: George McLaughlin
- Architectural type: Basilica

Administration
- Diocese: Diocese of Honolulu

Clergy
- Bishop: Larry Silva
- Pastor: Father Michel Dalton

Holy Trinity is a Roman Catholic church located in East Honolulu, Hawaiʻi.

Holy Trinity Church is located in the East Honolulu neighborhood of Kuliʻouʻou on the island of Oʻahu, at 5919 Kalanianaole Highway (Route 72), 21°16′59″N 157°43′45″W. The church serves the communities of Niu Valley, Kuliʻouʻou, and Hawaiʻi Kai. It falls under the jurisdiction of the Diocese of Honolulu and the bishop of Honolulu.
