= Customs and etiquette in Hawaii =

Customs and etiquette in Hawaii are customs and general etiquette that are widely observed in the Hawaiian Islands. In most cases, these will be observed by long-time residents and Native Hawaiians. Some customs are unique to certain ethnic groups but are commonly observed and known by all residents.

== Dining etiquette ==
"Make plate" or "Take plate" are common in gatherings of friends or family that follow a potluck format. It is considered good manners to "make plate", literally making a plate of food from the available spread to take home, or "take plate", literally taking a plate the host of the party has made of the available spread for easy left-overs.

It is considered gracious to take the plate, or make a small plate, even if you don't intend to eat it. In part, this tradition is related to clean-up, being a good guest by not leaving the mass of left-overs at the party-throwers house and making them alone responsible for clean up. In more recent times, this has also evolved into donating your left-overs to the homeless population, especially if you're having a get-together at a public park or similar location, as it is likely there is a homeless population living nearby as well.

It is also considered thoughtful to bring back gifts from a trip for friends and family. Some people use the Japanese name for such gifts, omiyage. Others use the Hawaiian word, "makana" or the Samoan term "oso". Gifts of special foods unavailable outside the region visited are particularly appropriate. For example, Krispy Kreme is not available on the island of Oahu and visitors to Maui, where the only franchise is located, often return with donuts for friends and family. Conversely, locals traveling to the US mainland and abroad will take foods from Hawaii to friends and relatives where local foods are unavailable.

If someone has given you gift items or has done a service for you without asking for repayment, it is always wise and of good upbringing to at least give them something in return or offer them money. While it is common for people to play "hot potato" and refuse to accept the money, the important idea is that the offer was made.

Locals do not always like to feel as if they are taking and will often return the favor of giving with giving. When someone outright refuses to accept your donation, some locals will make it a personal challenge to make sure this person is repaid by slyly hiding the money in the other person's belongings and making sure they are out of sight as to not be given anything back. In that case, it is best just to keep the form of repayment and be sure to do something special for the person the next time you see them.

== Luaus ==
The indigenous Hawaiian form of luʻau is something seen most frequently as a tourist event, as opposed to a regular occurrence in the local culture. Some exceptions apply, such as the birthday luau or weddings. The local lu'au has evolved more into a potluck. A lu'au is always set up as a buffet. Some aspects of the lu'au, such as traditional Hawaiian foods, or roast pig cooked in an imu remain, but for local get-together are most often provided through catering services rather than individual family activities. More traditional rural families on the neighbor islands, especially Kauai, Molokai, and Hawaii, will prepare the food themselves using help from their extended families. The extended family, family friends, and neighbors will provide pupu, or appetizers, for a separate "pupu line". In most cases, pupu is actually a euphemism for local delicacies that are provided in such abundance as to rival the actual main buffet line, the only difference being the absence of rice or poi, or starch, on the "pupu line".

=== The birthday lū’au ===
Historically, it was customary for Hawai‘i's families, regardless of ethnicity, to hold a luau to celebrate a child's first birthday. In Polynesian cultures (and also in Korean culture), the first birthday is considered a major milestone. (See the entry under "for visitors from the mainland" for fuller description). Although these celebrations are called lū’au, they could have an overarching theme. For example, a baby lū’au might be decorated with sports, superhero, cartoon, or other themes, along with games. Guests usually come with a birthday card and a small monetary gift for the money box. These gatherings often include extended family, friends, and neighbors and can reach hundreds of attendees. Polynesian families, especially Samoans, Tongans, and Māori, also commemorate 21st birthdays with lavish parties and feasts.

This is also the time when the family recognizes the grandparents, family, godparents, and friends from other islands, states, or countries. When it comes to godparents most cultures keep with the normality of one male and one female godparent. However for some cultures, for example, Filipinos, they will often have duplicate numbers of godparents for a single child. For some, this number reaches into the 30s or higher.

== Wedding customs ==
It is a tradition for a Japanese-American bride to fold a thousand origami cranes prior to her wedding for good luck and long life. People in Hawaii add one more for good luck.

At Japanese weddings, it is customary for friends and relatives to offer "banzai" toasts to the bride and groom, wishing them long life.

It is customary at Hawaii weddings, especially at Filipino weddings for the bride and groom to do a 'Money dance', also called the pandango. A similar custom is observed by Samoan and Tongan newlyweds who perform a solo dance called the "taualuga" or "tau'olunga", respectively. In all of these cases, as the bride and/or groom dance, the guests express their best wishes to the newlyweds with a monetary gift.

== Gratuities ==
Hawaii is a U.S. state, so gratuities are expected in accordance with American standards. For instance, 20–25% tips are the norm in restaurants. Many workers in Hawaii are paid less than minimum wage with tips factored into their regular pay similar to the US mainland. It can be considered rude to fail to tip or under tip your host or hostess.

== For visitors from the contiguous United States ==
=== Semantic considerations ===
- Depending on the audience, it may be deemed impolite to refer to the U.S. mainland as "the States" or to otherwise imply that Hawaiʻi is not part of the United States.
- It is rude to refer to the locals as "natives" or "Hawaiians". Only ethnically Native Hawaiians should be called "Hawaiians". Native Hawaiians, especially those involved in the sovereignty movement, often refer to themselves as "kanaka maoli" or "poʻe ʻōiwi." Non-Hawaiians who were born on the islands are generally referred to as "locals" to distinguish them from ethnic Hawaiians. Print media and local residents recommend that one refer to non-Hawaiians as "locals of Hawaii" or "people of Hawaii". In daily speech, few people use these words generally referring to themselves in passing as "from Hawaii". The term kamaʻāina is also used for locals of any ethnicity, particularly by businesses that offer local resident discounts. Never will someone who was born and raised in Hawaii but is not of full or part-native Hawaiian ethnicity ever refer to themselves as native Hawaiian or even Hawaiian. They will simply name their actual ethnicity. Most people in Hawaii are of mixed ethnicity.
- Unless fluent, one should not attempt to speak pidgin English. The pidgin used varies greatly by location with true forms following the grammatical rules of Hawaiian. Vocabulary will include heavy Hawaiian, Japanese, Filipino, and Portuguese influences. Some locals believe that if a non-local attempts to speak pidgin, it is equivalent to trying to speak with any other regional U.S. accent, thus mocking their way of speaking. Also, it is offensive to assume that a Hawaii resident can only speak/comprehend pidgin and cannot speak/comprehend Standard English.
- If you are living or visiting on Oʻahu, do not refer to the other Hawaiian islands as "outer" islands. Locals typically refer to them as the "neighbor" islands.
- If you are white, it is not uncommon to be referred to as haole. Sometimes erroneously spelt "hāʻole", the word is never actually said this way. In one of its earliest uses, the word haole is used to describe something of an observation of human migration made prior to Western contact. The term is usually used for "mainlanders" in general. As with other languages, you can make general distinctions by the tone of voice used. Thus, "howzit, haole boy?" has a different connotation than "eh, stupid haole." For many whites living in Hawaiʻi, being called haole is in fact taken as offensive, so just like many other racially charged terms, it is no longer considered politically correct to use the term.
- People of Portuguese descent may be offended if you refer to them as "haole", even though they themselves are Caucasian. The Portuguese have a long history in Hawaiʻi and share a common labor history with Chinese, Filipino, and people from other non-Caucasian backgrounds. Many Portuguese people in Hawaiʻi behave in the local custom and embody local values than those of other Caucasian descent; Portuguese influence is prominent in the fusion cuisine and pidgin communication of Hawaiʻi. At the same time, however, one should not assume that every white person who "acts local" is Portuguese.

=== Getting around ===
- If you are a visitor using public buses expect to wait for all of the local residents to board before you do. Many locals typically use public transportation to get to work, so tourists with daily bus fares are requested to, but not required to, wait for the next available open bus.
- Visitors driving vehicles on the islands are expected to honor signs which designate certain public roads as "local traffic only". These rules are enforced in order to protect local residents from dealing with extra traffic in their neighborhoods. Business areas would always be the exception to this.

=== Beaches ===
- There are many public beaches on the islands, but parking spaces may be limited in the "beach access lots". Since these "beach access" areas were initiated by state and local laws so that locals could regain access to beaches where they were denied access to in areas of heavy hotel/tourist development; it is appreciated when visitors leave these free limited parking spaces for the locals to use. Most hotels will allow day use parking for a fee.
- If you are coming to the Islands to surf it is best to ask the locals which beaches allow outsiders. In the most popular surfing areas, it takes many years to be accepted and forcing your way will usually be met with resistance from local surfers.

=== Environmental responsibility ===
- Always mālama ka ʻāina or in other words, take care of the land. Respect the local beaches and land by cleaning up your ʻōpala (trash) and take care to not upset any native species such as the Hawaiian green sea turtles, monk seals, and coral reefs. It is best to make sure all who visit can enjoy the natural resources. Visitors wishing to acquire shells, rocks and other mementos can usually find them for sale at many roadside stands, thus contributing to the local economy. When visiting the Big Island, it is important to not take any black sand or lava rock, as it is said to anger Pele, the Hawaiian fire goddess.
