= Demographic history of Hawaii =

Hawaii was first discovered and settled by Polynesians originating from the Society Islands or the Marquesas Islands, probably between 900 and 1200 C.E. The population of Hawaii grew, and then most likely remained stable for some time around 100,000–250,000 people. In 1776, Captain Cook brought European diseases into contact with the Hawaiian Islands, which, in combination with emigration, led to a rapid decline in the native population. Many white Europeans immigrated to Hawaii during this time, either for religious missions or as tradesmen. In the late 1800s many immigrants came from China, Japan, Korea, the Philippines, and Portugal to work on the plantations.

== Ancient Hawaiian population ==
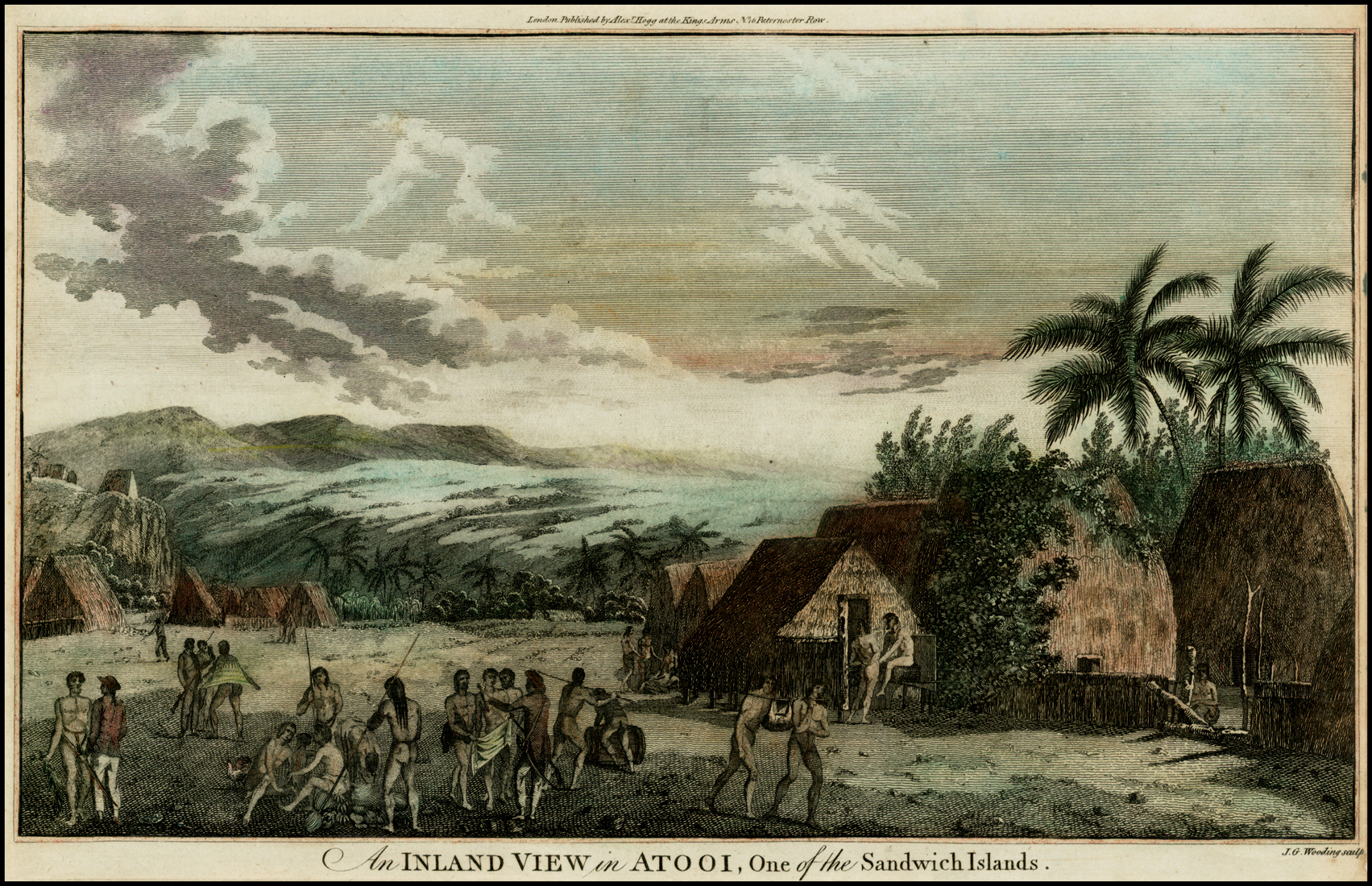
1785 etching of Waimea, Kauai, at the time of Cook's journey

There is no definitive date for the Polynesian discovery of Hawaii. However, high-precision radiocarbon dating in Hawaii using chronometric hygiene analysis, and taxonomic identification selection of samples, puts the initial such settlement of the Hawaiian Islands sometime between 940–1250 C.E., originating from earlier settlements first established in the Society Islands around 1025 to 1120 C.E., and in the Marquesas Islands sometime between 1100 and 1200 C.E.

There is still controversy about how many Native Hawaiians were living on the islands when Captain James Cook arrived in 1778. The frequently hypothesized model is that population growth was constant until James Cook's arrival, and was then halted by disease, followed by a rapid decrease. This theory relies on a hypothetical settlement date that radiocarbon dating in Hawaii has since refuted, as well as linear growth on the islands. Nevertheless, this theory is still used to support an estimate of between 800,000 and 1,000,000 people in 1778.

The constant-population-growth theory of Hawaii has scant support from the archaeological data and is contradicted by paleo-environmental evidence and radiocarbon dating of historical sites. Accordingly the evidence indicates a model of arrested population growth, especially as a consequence of island life. This theory finds corroboration in archaeological censuses of abandoned habitation sites on leeward (southern and western) Hawai'i island and Kaho'olawe Island which indicate that population levels reached a peak before Cook's arrival. The arrested-growth model fits well with an estimated pre-contact-era population of between 200,000 and 250,000, derived primarily from the study of historical records.

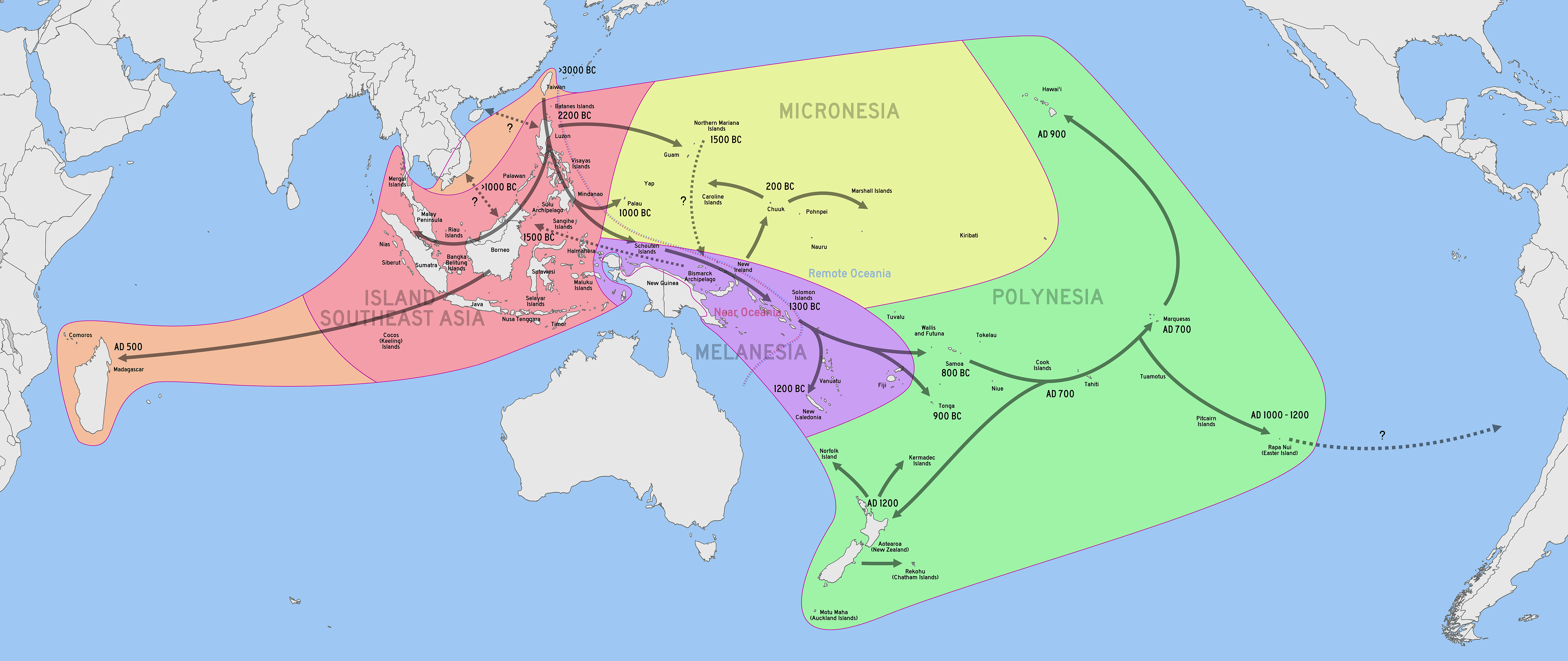
Map showing the migration of the Austronesians

Population estimates based on an initial discovery and settlement of Hawaii in around 1150 CE, a proposed growth rate at the highest in the world and reliance on the paleo-environmental evidence of early human impact on the land completely contradict the constant-population-growth theory. Instead the estimated population curve can be divided into three sections: pre-settlement where there were no people, the initial settlement growth phase of approximately 100 people around 1150 CE to the population peak in 1450 of approximately 150,000 people and third phase between 1450 and 1778, which reflected a relatively stable population where apparent declines were followed by periods of growth.

Simply and briefly, as the population grew so did their agricultural imprint (forest clearing by burning) and building of heiau at those sites, as well as the decline of plants. The paleo-environmental data showed that during 1450–1778 the pace of construction of heiau slowed dramatically, as did the clearing of agricultural land. Accordingly, the estimated population in 1778 around the time of Cook's arrival was between 110,000 and 150,000.

== Post-Captain Cook Western contact ==
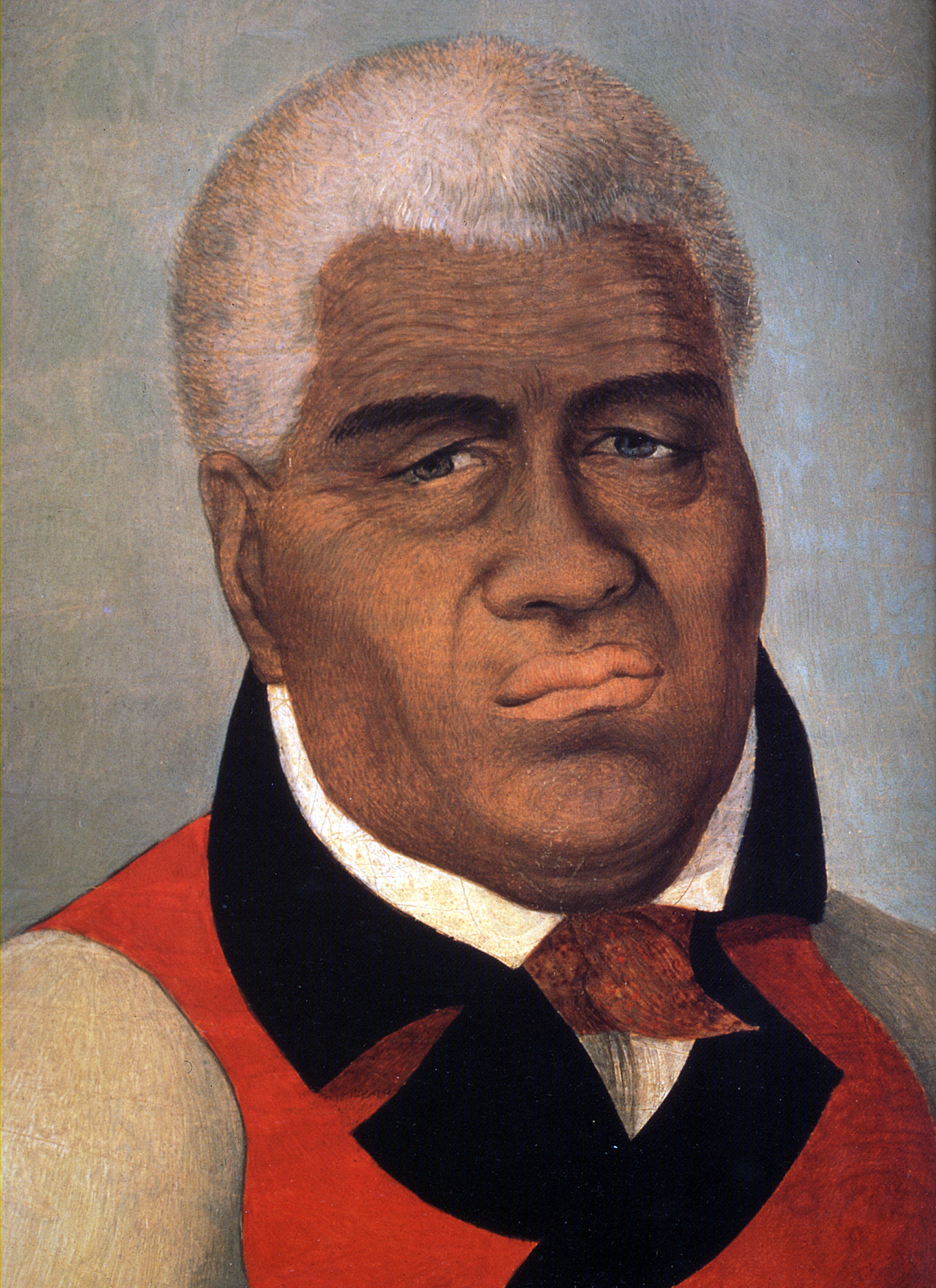
King Kamehameha I of Hawaii

Economic and demographic factors in the 18th to 19th centuries reshaped the Kingdom of Hawaii. With unfamiliar diseases such as bubonic plague, leprosy, yellow fever, declining fertility, high infant mortality, infanticide, the introduction of alcohol, and emigration off the islands or to larger cities for trade jobs, the Native Hawaiian population fell from around 150,000 in 1778 to 71,000 by 1853.

=== Rapid depopulation ===
The rapid depopulation of the Hawaiian people is traced to many causes. Missionary William Ellis described deserted villages and abandoned enclosures which he attributed to "the frequent and desolating wars during Kamehameha's reign, the ravages of a pestilence brought in the first instance by foreign vessels, which has twice during the period [1778-1823] swept through the islands; the awful prevalence of infanticide; and the melancholy increase and destructive consequences of depravity and vice." The Hawaii State Statistician Robert C. Schmitt explained the severe depopulation as a result of declining fertility, high infant mortality, and emigration.

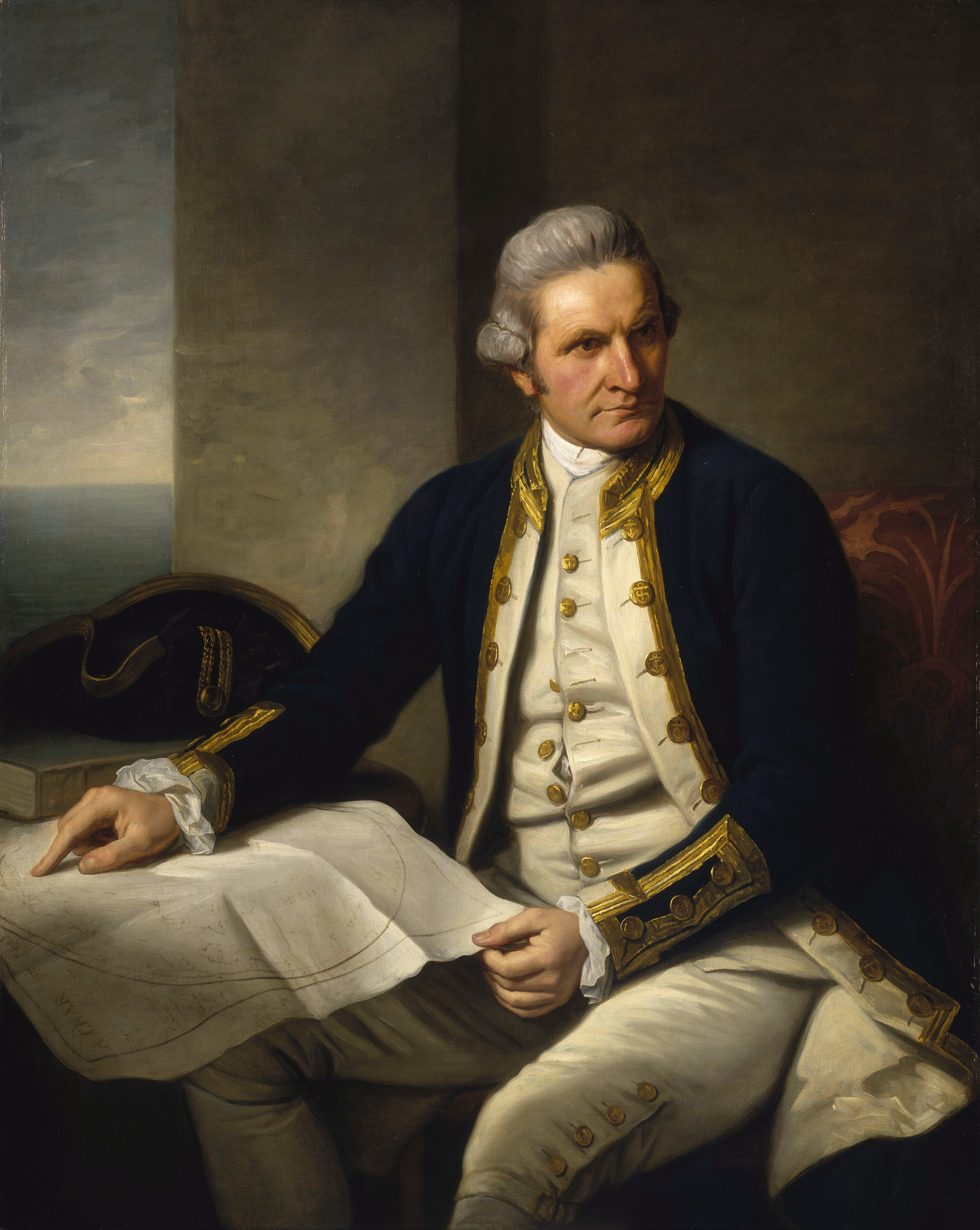
British explorer James Cook was the first European to establish formal ties with the island in 1778

The Hawaiians' customs and land use system also caused a downward spiral in the population from which after the diseases they could not recover. Firstly, Hawaiians practiced population control with infanticide, abortion, and the like. By one estimate by William Ellis in 1823, nearly two-thirds of babies were killed. It was not until 1835 and 1850 respectively that infanticide and abortion became illegal. Secondly, the family unit was centered around a "punahele" or favored child; a firstborn who would inherit the grandparent's property and continue the kupuna kin group. In this system, grandparents were responsible to then feed not only their children, but also their children's children. Further families could simply not accommodate growing unless they were ceded new lands from a kupuna group or applied for new lands with the local konohiki and paid for with renewed acts of submission. During the nineteenth century young adults found other things to do than to go into servitude as a hoa'aina (tenant). Artemas Bishop at Ewa in 1845 stated, "the young people of both sexes are idlers of a most worthless character, and dependent, in most cases, upon others for their daily food. There is scarcely a truly respectable and industrious young person of adult age, among the uneducated classes."

=== Whaling industry ===
Between 1820 and 1845 American commercial involvement in Hawaii surged and so did the whaling industry. Between the first few ships in 1819 by the 1840s there were some 400-500 ships which made semi-annual visits to the islands on their way back to New England Ports for provisions, recreation and labor. For instance a census of 1840 in Nantucket, Massachusetts, which was a center of whaling ships, indicates 793 Native Hawaiians had emigrated there alone.

== Colonial-era immigration ==
With fewer natives to work on the sugar plantations and the rapid depopulation from emigration on whaler ships, recruiters started to fan out across Asia and Europe for more male labor. As a result, between 1850 and 1900 some 200,000 laborers from China, Japan, Korea, Philippines, Portugal, Germany, Norway and elsewhere came to Hawaii under contracts. This greatly diversified the islands. Most left the sugar plantations on schedule, because Hawaii was viewed by migrants as a place to earn money rather than settle and raise families (there was only one Chinese woman per seventeen Chinese men).

In response to the rising immigration, King Kamehameha V established the Board of Immigration to control the importation of foreign labor. Although critical of the fact that Chinese male laborers were treated like slaves and whipped, the Hawaiian government asserted that the primary purpose was population reinforcement of the labor force to combat high mortality and depopulation of the islands. By 1881, however, they were prohibiting immigration of Chinese men altogether for a period because of mistreatment and exploitation.

Japanese migrants to the United States mainly came to Hawaii. In 1893, there were 22,000 Japanese in Hawaii, compared to 4,500 in the continental United States.

Despite the ban on immigration, there were still large numbers of Chinese and Japanese who stayed after their contracts ended, creating a small Chinatown in Honolulu. By 1893, Chinese and Japanese male workers represented 51.9% of the population. Once Hawaii was annexed in 1900, federal law applied and prohibited further Chinese immigration altogether. Koreans immigrated until 1905, and by 1908, a total of 180,000 Japanese workers had already arrived, though no more Japanese were allowed in after that. Ultimately, 50,000 Japanese workers remained permanently. Records from 1852 to 1875 indicate that in total, 56,720 Chinese arrived during that time period, however there were thousands of duplicates in the number of arrival records because of re-entry of those who had left the islands and returned. The first US census in 1900 put the population of Chinese at 22,296 men and 3,471 women.

== Historical population ==
Estimated Population
Year	Population (est.)	Notes
400	<1,000	
1150	20,000	Labor dedicated to Heiau construction begins to increase. Introduction of agricultural burning to make space for farming.
1450	160,000	Population hits its peak after a steep exponential increase.
1600	150,000	Agricultural burning has slowed down and the population has begun to decline.
1700	96,000	
1778	128,000	Population bounces back.
1805	112,000 to 150,000	

Official Population Census
Year	Population	Notes
1831	130,313	First reliable census is taken 1831-1832.
1835	108,579	Second missionary census is taken 1835-1836:
1850	82,000	
1853	73,134	
1872	56,897	
1878	57,985	
1884	80,578	
1890	89,990	
1900	154,001	About 25% Hawaiian/part-Hawaiian; 40% Japanese; 16% Chinese; 12% Portuguese; and about 5% other Caucasian

== See also ==
- Demographics of Hawaii
- History of Hawaii
