= Mary Dominis =

First mistress of Washington Place, Honolulu

- Born: Mary Lambert Jones; August 3, 1803; Boston, Massachusetts, United States
- Died: April 25, 1889 (aged 85); Honolulu, Oahu, Kingdom of Hawaii
- Resting place: Oahu Cemetery
- Spouse: John Dominis
- Children: John Owen, Mary Elizabeth, Frances Ann
- Relatives: Liliʻuokalani (daughter-in-law)

Mary Lambert Jones Dominis (August 3, 1803 – April 25, 1889) was an American settler of Hawaii and the first mistress of Washington Place in Honolulu. Born into a large New England family, she married merchant sea Captain John Dominis, for whom Honolulu was a frequent port of trade. The couple relocated in 1837 to the Hawaiian Kingdom with their son John Owen Dominis. Their two daughters remained behind to complete their education.

As the Dominis mansion was being constructed, King Kamehameha III relocated the seat of government from Lahaina, Maui, to Honolulu, which was quickly becoming a nexus where commerce and the government intersected. As her husband was often away, Mary was responsible for overseeing the construction of the house and gardens. On a voyage to China, Captain Dominis was lost at sea, and the completion of the mansion fell to Mary, who took in long-term boarders. On the birthday of U.S. President George Washington in 1848, the U.S. commissioner to Hawaii, Anthony Ten Eyck, who was living there as a boarder, had the mansion officially named "Washington Place".

Her son John Owen Dominis married Hawaiian high chiefess Lydia Kamakaʻeha Pākī, the future Queen Liliʻuokalani. She disapproved of the marriage but came to terms with the union towards the end of her life. Upon Mary's death, her daughter-in-law removed the American flag that had flown at Washington Place.

Mary Dominis established the first European-style garden in Hawaii. She also began Hawaii's annual Christmas festivities by inviting the children of Honolulu and their parents to Washington Place to celebrate the holiday. This event marked the first appearance of the Christmas tree and Santa Claus traditions in Hawaii. The celebrations of Christmas at Washington House have continued for over 160 years and are an annual tradition in Honolulu.

== Early life ==
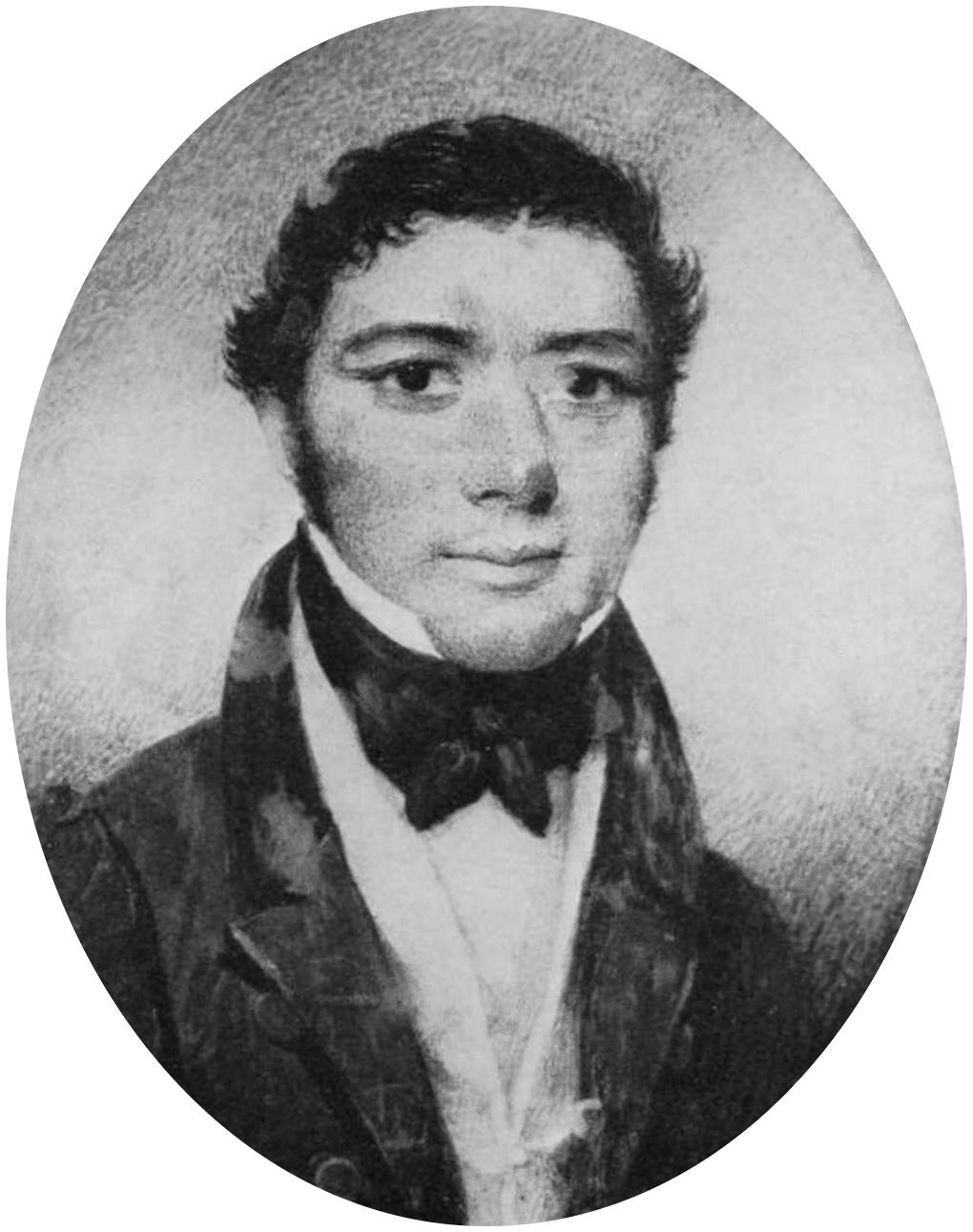
Captain Dominis (1796–1846)

Mary Lambert Jones was born on August 3, 1803, in Boston, Massachusetts, to Owen Jones and Elizabeth Lambert. One of eight children, her extended family remained mainly in New England except for her brother-in-law Robert William Holt (1792–1862) who settled in Hawaii around 1833 after her sister Anne Marie's death in 1832. Mary was left in charge of the guardianship of her two nieces Anna Marie and Elizabeth.

Jones married the merchant sea Captain John Dominis (1796–1846), originally of Trieste, on October 9, 1821. They had three known children: Mary Elizabeth Dominis (1825–1838), Frances Ann Dominis (1829–1842), and John Owen Dominis (1832–1891). The family lived in Boston and were listed in directories of Boston until about 1831 when they moved to Schenectady, New York, where John Owen was born. Captain Dominis was frequently absent from home, as he was involved in the China Trade in the Far East and competed in the fur trade in the Pacific Northwest with the British Hudson's Bay Company. Commanding the brig Owyhee in 1827, he became the first American importer to cure and introduce the Pacific salmon to the markets of New England. He frequently stopped in the Hawaiian Islands to conduct business and resupply. Captain Dominis, Mary and their son John Owen Dominis re-settled in Honolulu, arriving by the bark Jones on April 23, 1837. Their two daughters were left in New England for their education. Mary Elizabeth and Frances Ann both died in 1838 and 1842, respectively, and were buried in the Vale Cemetery of Schenectady.

== Life in Hawaii ==
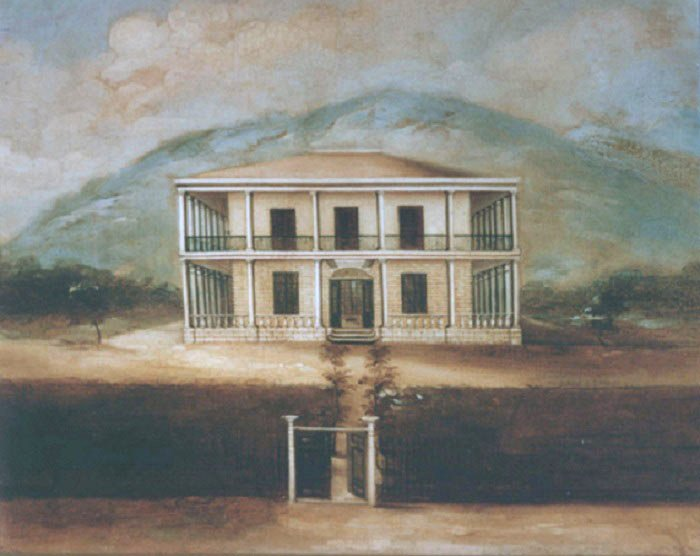
Washington Place, Honolulu. Oil on paper by an anonymous artist, ca. 1850–1854

In Honolulu, the Dominises started building a mansion, on lands near the residence of the British consul to Hawaii Richard Charlton. Between 1841 and 1847, the construction details of the mansion were largely attended to by Mary since Captain Dominis was mostly away on voyages raising money for the building cost. Honolulu had become the political and business capital of the Hawaiian Kingdom, as during the mid-1840s, King Kamehameha III relocated the government from Lahaina, establishing his residence at ʻIolani Palace on adjacent property facing the Dominis property. In 1846 Captain Dominis sailed for China on the brig William Neilson, intending to purchase Chinese-made furniture for the house which was nearing completion. The ship was lost at sea, along with the United States commissioner George Brown, and Mary became a widow.

After the reality of her husband's death became apparent, Dominis opened up Washington Place to boarders to support herself and her young son John Owen Dominis. (Note: "She opened her house to well-connected, long-term guests to Honolulu and welcomed many more through her dinner parties. That her guests paid for such privileges was known in Honolulu. Likely the architecture and setting of Washington Place, and the remoteness of Honolulu, overrode the social stigma typically associated with boardinghouses on the American mainland.") Among these tenants was Anthony Ten Eyck, the US resident commissioner to Hawaii. While boarding with the Dominises, his room became the United States legation in Honolulu. On February 22, 1848, the birthday of the first US President George Washington, Ten Eyck wrote to the kingdom's Minister of Foreign Affairs Robert Crichton Wyllie, that he had re-named the mansion "Washington Place". Wyllie replied in agreement the same date. Kuhina Nui Keoni Ana issued the official proclamation from Kamehameha III, of the renaming on Washington's birthday. Other tenants and guests included American diplomats Luther Severance, David L. Gregg and Elisha Hunt Allen and politicians William Little Lee and Robert Crichton Wyllie. Dominis also established the first European-style garden in Honolulu.

On September 16, 1862, Dominis' son married the Hawaiian high chiefess Lydia Kamakaʻeha Pākī, the future Queen Liliʻuokalani. The "small and quiet" wedding was held at Haleʻākala, the residence of Bernice Pauahi Bishop and her husband Charles Reed Bishop. The ceremony was officiated by Rev. Samuel C. Damon in the Anglican rites. King Kamehameha IV and other members of the royal family were honored guests. The newly married couple moved to Washington Place with Dominis. John was appointed Governor of Oʻahu in 1868 by King Kamehameha V. After the accession of Liliʻuokalani's brother King Kalākaua in 1874, John was also appointed Governor of Maui in 1878 and Lieutenant General and Commander in Chief of the Hawaiian Army in 1886.

Despite Liliʻuokalani's royal status, Mary Dominis disapproved of the marriage. According to historian James L. Haley, Mary Dominis was an "arrant racist" toward her daughter-in-law. The married life of Dominis and Liliʻuokalani was a troubled one, however by the time of Mary's death, she had learned to accepted her. In Hawaii's Story by Hawaii's Queen, Liliʻuokalani revealed a little about her domestic difficulties:

As she felt that no one should step between "[Dominis]" and her child, naturally "[Liliʻuokalani]", as her son's wife, was considered an intruder; and I was forced to realize this from the beginning. My husband was extremely kind and considerate to me, yet he would not swerve to the one side or to the other in any matter where there was danger of hurting his mother's feelings. I respected the closeness of the tie between mother and son, and conformed my own ideas, so far as I could, to encourage and assist my husband in his devotion to his mother. Later in life Mrs. Dominis seemed to fully realize that there had been some self-sacrifice, and she became more and more a tender and affectionate mother to me as her days were drawing to a close.

Mary Dominis died on April 25, 1889, and was buried at the Oahu Cemetery in Honolulu. After Mary Dominis's death, Queen Liliuokalani took down the American flag which had flown at Washington Place during Mary's lifetime. This flag wouldn't be raised again until April 1917 when Liliuokalani raised it in honor of Hawaiian casualties in the sinking of the SS Aztec by German U-boats.

=== Christmas in Hawaii ===
Mary Dominis is credited with starting the Christmas tree and Santa Claus traditions in Hawaii. Christmas in Hawaii had been introduced by the American Protestant missionaries who arrived in the islands in 1820. However, celebrations were never consistent or officially sanctioned until the 1850s since the Puritanic origin of the New England missionaries disapproved of the non-canonical holiday. During the reign of King Kamehameha IV and his consort Queen Emma of Hawaii, the Christmas tradition received greater support under the influence of the newly established Anglican Church of Hawaii. On Christmas Eve of 1858, Mary Dominis invited the children of Honolulu and their parents to Washington Place to celebrate the holiday. The party, featuring the first appearance of a Christmas tree and Santa Claus in Hawaii, received significant coverage in local Hawaiian newspapers: The Pacific Commercial Advertiser, The Polynesian and The Friend. The Advertiser reported:

Christmas passed off in good old fashioned style. The eve was ushered in by the assemblage of a large number of children and their parents at Washington Place, the mansion of Mrs. Dominis, where Santa Claus had given out that he would hold his court...A magnificent Christmas Tree had been provided...and the little folks as they gathered about it...found it all lighted up with candles, and the branches bending with the weight of gifts. Prompt as old Father Time ever was, bells were heard at the windows...and in a moment old Santa Claus stood at the door before the youthful group, who greeted him with a volley of merry shouts. He was dressed in the garb in which children love to imagine the saintly old elf...For an hour he bestowed his gifts with princely lavishness among the 100 children present, creating one of the happiest groups ever witnessed in Honolulu...who will long continue to talk of Santa Claus of Washington Place.

The tradition of opening Washington House for Christmas celebrations has continued in Honolulu for over 160 years. Annually the government sponsors tours of the home and various concerts and exhibits.

== Bibliography ==
- Allen, Helena G. (1982). The Betrayal of Liliuokalani: Last Queen of Hawaii, 1838–1917. Glendale, CA: A. H. Clark Company. ISBN 978-0-87062-144-4. OCLC 9576325.
- Dutton, Meiric Keeler (1950). Christmas in Hawaii. Honolulu: E. & M. Dutton. OCLC 16339340.
- Haley, James L. (2014). Captive Paradise: A History of Hawaii. New York: St. Martin's Press. ISBN 978-0-312-60065-5. OCLC 865158092.
- Hays, Kenneth (April 18, 2006). Patty Henry; Paul Lusignan (eds.). Washington Place. Washington, DC: National Park Service.
- Holt, John Dominis; Sinesky, Alice (1987). "John Dominis Holt". Watumull Foundation Oral History Project. 16. Honolulu. hdl:10524/48676. OCLC 663425247.
- Kovacevic, Ante (1976). "On the Descent of John Owen Dominis, Prince Consort of Queen Liliuokalani". The Hawaiian Journal of History. 10. Honolulu: Hawaiian Historical Society: 3–24. hdl:10524/409. OCLC 60626541.
- Kuykendall, Ralph Simpson (1938). The Hawaiian Kingdom 1778-1854, Foundation and Transformation. Vol. 1. Honolulu: University of Hawaii Press. ISBN 0-87022-431-X. OCLC 47008868.
- Liliuokalani (1898). Hawaii's Story by Hawaii's Queen, Liliuokalani. Boston: Lee and Shepard. ISBN 978-0-548-22265-2. OCLC 2387226.
- Lowe, Scott C. (2011). Christmas - Philosophy for Everyone: Better Than a Lump of Coal. John Wiley & Sons. ISBN 978-1-4443-4145-4.
- Price, Virginia (March 2009). "Washington Place: Harboring American Claims, Housing Hawaiian Culture". Buildings & Landscapes: Journal of the Vernacular Architecture Forum. 16 (2). Minneapolis, MN: University of Minnesota Press: 48–72. doi:10.1353/bdl.0.0029. OCLC 688617531. S2CID 161910629.
- Proto, Neil Thomas (2009). The Rights of My People: Liliuokalani's Enduring Battle with the United States, 1893–1917. New York: Algora Publishing. ISBN 978-0-87586-720-5. OCLC 319248358.
- Siler, Julia Flynn (2012). Lost Kingdom: Hawaii's Last Queen, the Sugar Kings and America's First Imperial Adventure. New York: Atlantic Monthly Press. ISBN 978-0-8021-9488-6. OCLC 881683650.
- Taylor, Albert Pierce (1922). Under Hawaiian skies, a narrative of the romance, adventure and history of the Hawaiian Islands. Advertiser Publishing Company, Ltd. – via HathiTrust.
- Taylor, Clarice B. (1954). Holt, Lisa Ululani (ed.). The Fabulous Holts. Honolulu. Archived from the original on December 8, 2016.
