= 2012 in Hawaii =

- Decades: 1990s; 2000s; 2010s; 2020s
- See also: History of Hawaii; Historical outline of Hawaii; List of years in Hawaii; 2012 in the United States

Events from 2012 in Hawaiʻi.

== Incumbents ==
- Governor: Neil Abercrombie
- Lieutenant Governor: Shan Tsutsui

== Events ==
Ongoing – Puʻu ʻŌʻō eruption

- March 9 – 2012 Hawaii hailstorm: A supercell thunderstorm causes hail to fall in windward Oʻahu and an EF0 tornado to touch down in Kailua.
- April 21 – The inaugural Lotte Championship is held at the Ko Olina Golf Club on Oʻahu. Ai Miyazato wins by four strokes.
- November 6 –
  - 2012 United States presidential election in Hawaii
  - 2012 United States Senate election in Hawaii
  - 2012 United States House of Representatives elections in Hawaii
  - 2012 Hawaii Senate election
  - 2012 Hawaii House of Representatives election
- December 24 – 2012 Hawaii Bowl: The Fresno State Bulldogs lose to the SMU Mustangs 10–43.

== Deaths ==
- December 17 – Daniel Inouye, 88, member of the U.S. Senate for Hawaiʻi (1963–2012) and Medal of Honor recipient
