= History of Hawaii =

The history of Hawaii began with the arrival of Polynesian peoples in the Hawaiian Islands between 940 and 1200 AD. The islands' history is marked by a slow, steady growth in population and the size of the chiefdoms, which grew to encompass whole islands. Local chiefs, called aliʻi, ruled their settlements, and launched wars to extend their influence and defend their communities from predatory rivals. Ancient Hawaiʻi was a caste-based society, much like that of Hindus in India. Population growth was facilitated by ecological and agricultural practices that combined upland agriculture (mauka), ocean fishing (makai), fishponds and gardening systems. These systems were upheld by spiritual and religious beliefs, like the lokahi, that linked cultural continuity with the health of the natural world. According to Hawaiian scholar Mililani Trask, the lokahi symbolizes the "greatest of the traditions, values, and practices of our people ... There are three points in the triangle—the Creator, Akua; the peoples of the earth, Kanaka Maoli; and the land, the ʻaina. These three things all have a reciprocal relationship."

In January 1778, Great Britain and the Hawaiians came into contact when explorer James Cook and his crew sighted the islands during his third voyage of exploration. This became the first recorded and sustained contact between Europeans and Hawaiians. This had a significant impact on Hawaii, even in this initial limited interaction, introducing firearms to Hawaiian warfare. Aided by firearms and ships, Kamehameha I conquered and unified most of the islands in 1795, establishing the Kingdom of Hawaii. The unification was completed in 1810 when Kauaʻi and Niʻihau voluntarily joined the kingdom. This event marked the end of the long tradition of warfare among rival chiefs. The Kingdom was an internationally recognized sovereign state, being recognized by the United States, Japan, Great Britain, France, Spain, and other powers through treaties and diplomatic exchanges beginning in the 1820s. The United States signed its first treaty with Hawaii on December 23, 1826; France followed on July 17, 1839. The kingdom became prosperous and important for its agriculture and strategic location in the Pacific.

The group of islands did not have a single name, and each island was ruled separately. The names of the islands recorded by Captain Cook reflect this fact. Kamehameha I, as ruler of the island of Hawaii, imposed the name Hawaiʻi on the whole island group when he unified them as the Kingdom of Hawaiʻi.

American immigration, led by Protestant missionaries, and Native Hawaiian emigration, mostly on whaling ships but also in high numbers as indentured servants and as forced labor, began almost immediately after Cook's arrival. Americans established plantations to grow crops for export. Their farming methods required substantial labor. Waves of permanent immigrants came from Japan, China, and the Philippines to labor in the cane and pineapple fields. The government of Japan organized and gave special protection to its people, who comprised about 25 percent of the Hawaiian population by 1896. The Hawaiian monarchy encouraged this multi-ethnic society, initially establishing a constitutional monarchy in 1840 that promised equal voting rights regardless of race, gender, or wealth.

The population of Native Hawaiians declined precipitously from an unknown number prior to 1778 (estimated to be around 300,000). It fell to around 142,000 in the 1820s based on a census conducted by American missionaries, 82,203 in the 1850 Hawaiian Kingdom census, 40,622 in the final Hawaiian Kingdom census of 1890, 39,504 in the sole census by the Republic of Hawaii in 1896, and 37,656 in the first census conducted by the United States in 1900. Thereafter the Native Hawaiian population in Hawaii increased with every census, reaching 680,442 in 2020 (including people of mixed heritage).

In 1893 Queen Liliʻuokalani was illegally deposed and placed under house arrest by businessmen (who included members of the Dole family) with help from the U.S. Marines. The Republic of Hawaii governed for a short time until Hawaii was annexed by the United States in 1898 as the Territory of Hawaii. In 1959, the islands became the 50th American state.

== Ancient Hawaii ==
=== Polynesian migration and arrival ===
Chronological dispersal of Austronesian people across the Pacific

The date of the first arrival of people is a continuing debate. Kirch's textbooks on Hawaiian archeology date the first Polynesian settlements to about 300, although his more recent estimates are as late as 600. Other theories suggest dates as late as 700 to 800. The most recent survey of carbon-dating evidence puts the arrival of people at around 940–1130.

The history of the ancient Polynesians was passed down through genealogy chants recited at formal and family functions. The high chiefs' genealogy traced back to the period believed to be inhabited only by gods. The pua aliʻi ("flower of royalty") were considered to be living gods.

Tahitian priest Paʻao is said to have brought a new order around 1200. It included laws and a social structure that separated the people into classes. The aliʻi nui was the king, with his ʻaha kuhina just below them. The aliʻi were the royal nobles with the kahuna (high priest) below them, the makaʻāinana (commoners) next with the kauā as the lowest class.

The rulers (noho aliʻi o ko Hawaiʻi Pae ʻAina) were independent rulers of geographic areas. Their genealogy traces to Hānalaʻanui and others. The aliʻi nui were responsible for making sure that people observed a strict kapu (code of conduct). The system governed many aspects of Hawaiian social order, fishing rights and even where women could eat.

Hawaiians continued to travel between the Hawaiian Islands and other parts of Polynesia. Regular voyages occurred between Tahiti and Hawaii for some time, but stopped around 1300 AD.

=== Social structure ===
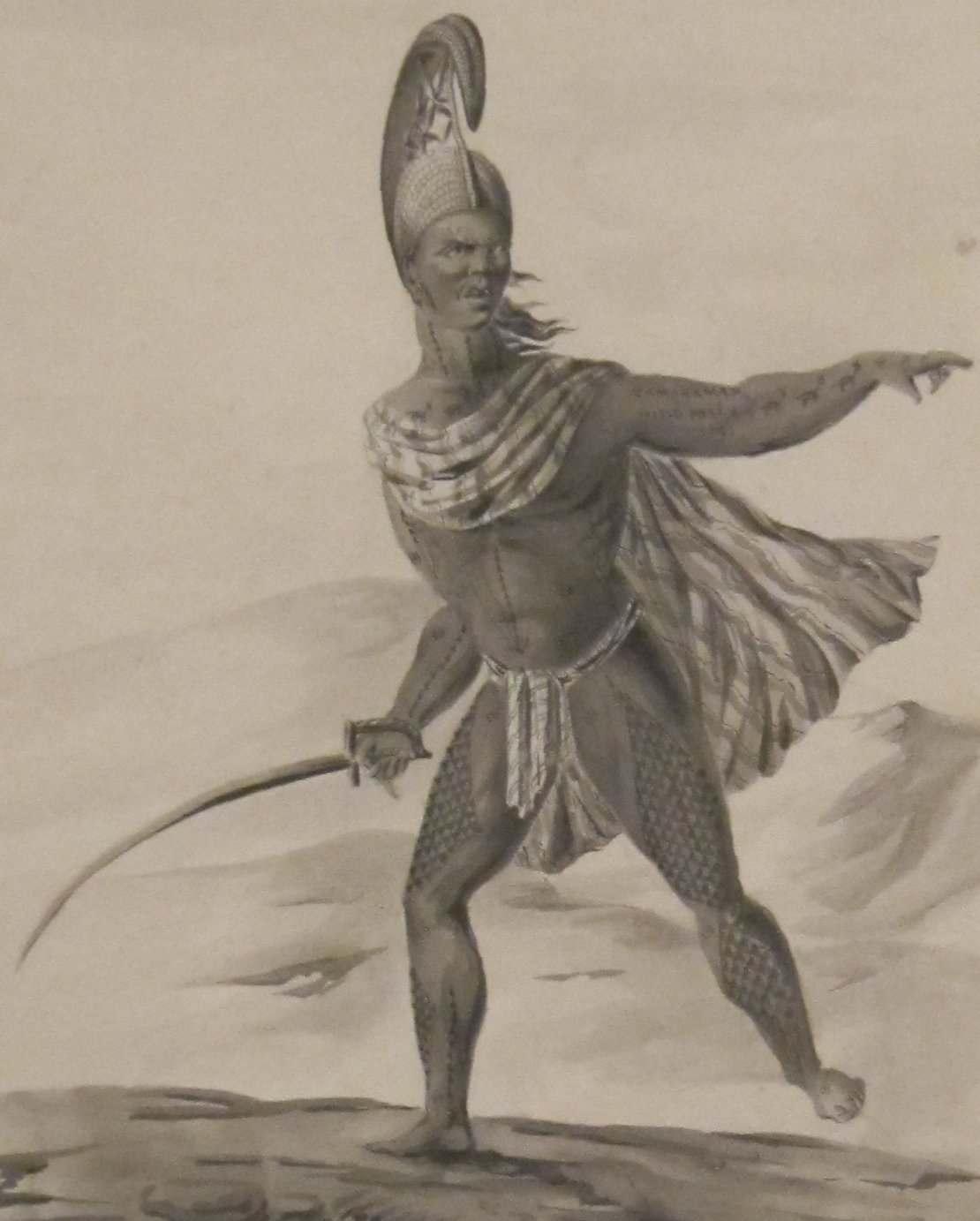
Ahihineho, an officer of Kamehameha I, in a traditional mahiole helmet. Drawing by Jacques Étienne Arago (1819)

According to the genealogical traditions of Hawaiian chiefs, one of the newcomers was Paʻao, a priest from the island of Tahiti, who, after quarreling with his brother, sailed north with 38 relatives and servants. Reaching the Hawaiian Islands, he became a priest of a new religion. Finding the local king to be an evil and immoral man, Paʻao sent messengers for help to Tahiti. From there came a local chief named Pili, who overthrew the tyrant king and became the new ruler. Pili is considered an ancestor of King Kamehameha I, who later founded the Kingdom of Hawaii (1810), and Paʻao's descendants are said to have served as his high priests.

After Pili's accession, the Hawaiian Islands remained largely isolated from the rest of Polynesia for several centuries. This long era in Hawaiian history was marked by frequent struggles among local chiefs (aliʻi) for land and supremacy. The archipelago fragmented into at least four independent chiefdoms, centered on the islands of Hawaiʻi, Maui, Oʻahu and Kauaʻi, each headed by a local ruler. Other smaller islands sometimes formed short‑lived independent polities but soon fell under the control of one of the four larger kingdoms.

In ancient Hawaiʻi, all spheres of public life (state power, social relations, and the economy) were closely linked with religion. Hawaiian society was hierarchical. At the top were high chiefs (aliʻi nui) and lesser chiefs (aliʻi), whose authority was based on genealogy and the kapu system. Below them were the kahuna, priests, healers, navigators, and other specialists, who held significant status. The commoners (makaʻāinana) performed most manual labor and were subject to the chiefs' will. At the bottom were outcasts (kauā). A mark of chiefly and military elite status was the traditional feathered helmet, the mahiole.

The boundaries of chiefdoms often changed due to frequent inter‑tribal and inter‑clan warfare. After a high chief conquered new lands, he would later redistribute them among lower‑ranking chiefs who owed allegiance to him. The high chief could take away granted lands and give them to another associate. Commoners were tied to the land, though they could sometimes move from one chief's territory to another. For the use of the land they tilled, commoners gave a portion of their produce (including from fishing) to the chief. Military detachments were formed in times of war from the commoners under a chief's authority.

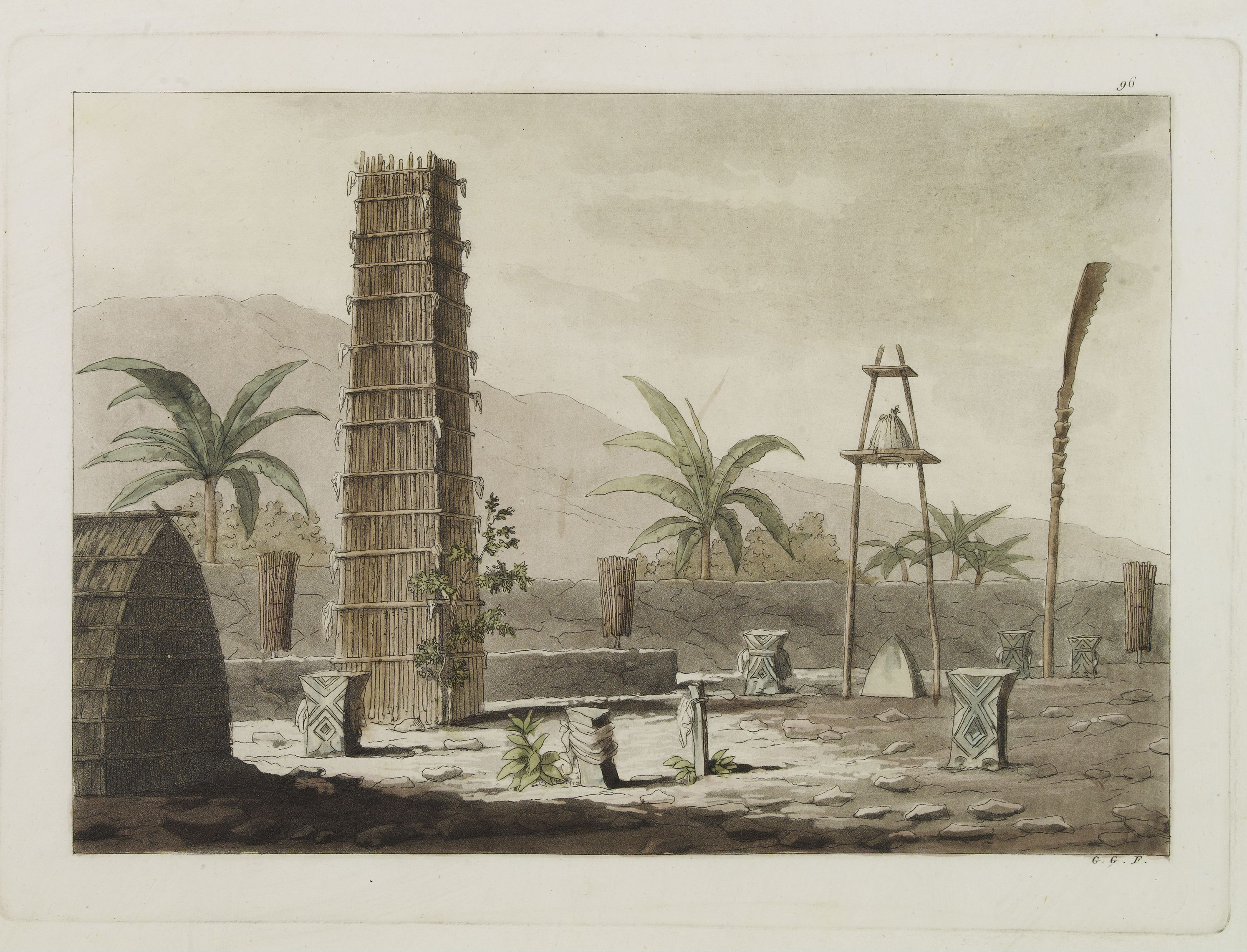
A heiau (drawing made around 1778).

Religious rituals accompanied any serious action, whether building a house or going to battle. Hawaiian religion involved the worship of natural forces and ancestral spirits. Gods personified various forces of nature. Among many deities, three were especially prominent: Kāne, god of light and life; Lono, god of harvest and peace; and Kū, god of war, who was particularly revered. Places of worship and sacrifice were called heiau; human sacrifices were sometimes performed at state temples (luakini).

In Hawaiʻi, a complex system of religious law known as kapu developed, consisting of prohibitions whose violation was severely punished. A commoner was forbidden to stand in the presence of a high chief (whose power was deified) or to touch his clothing. Women could not eat in the presence of men, and they were forbidden to consume pork, bananas, coconuts, and certain types of fish. The kapu system also protected the interests of lower‑ranking chiefs.

=== Culture and daily life ===
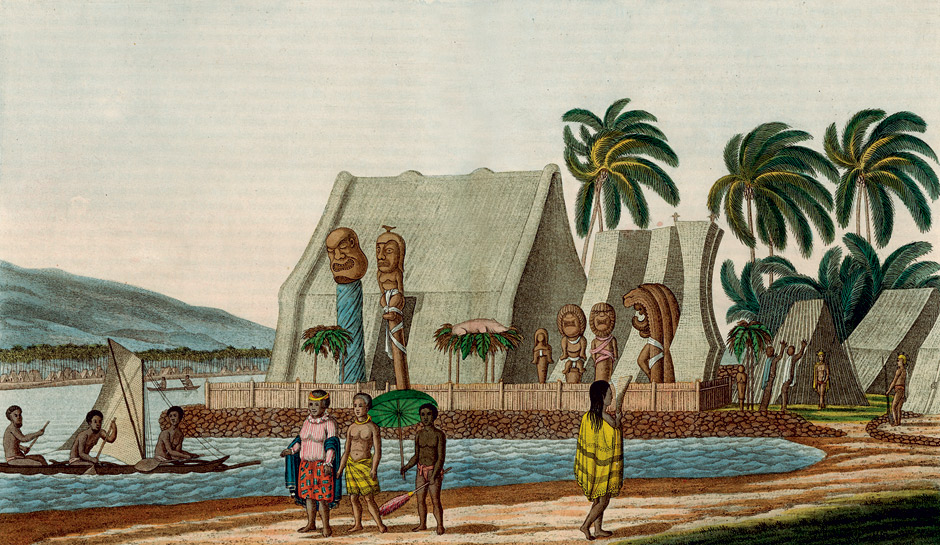
A Hawaiian sanctuary in Kailua Bay on the island of Oahu. (Lithograph from the German edition of Otto von Kotzebue's notes, 1821.)

Most of the population settled near the sea, which provided their main food, fish. Hawaiians were skilled fishers. The primary watercraft was the canoe, ranging from single‑person to large multi‑person vessels. Nets made from pandanus leaves or coconut palm fronds were used for catching crabs.

House‑building was a common free‑time occupation, as each family typically needed several living spaces. Dwellings were not very sturdy; roofs were thatched with palm leaves. Fire was considered sacred and was produced by rubbing two pieces of wood together.

Providing food for the family was a man's duty. The staple was poi, made from taro (Colocasia esculenta). Because taro requires large amounts of water, irrigation systems were built, and the fields resembled modern rice paddies. After harvest, taro was steamed in underground ovens called imu and then pounded into a paste. Other crops included sweet potato, breadfruit, yam, coconut, sugarcane, and seaweed. Pigs, dogs, and chickens were raised.

According to Hawaiian legend, the menehune lived on the islands before the first humans, dwarfs who ate bananas and built temples for their gods. It is to them that the residents owe the appearance of ponds in which it was possible to breed fish.

Cannibalism was not practiced in historical times; only in ancient traditions are there isolated instances of ritual cannibalism.

Women raised children, wove mats, and made kapa cloth – clothing (mainly skirts) from the inner bark of the mulberry tree. The cloth was dyed gray, brown, blue, red, and yellow, and decorated with patterns. Due to the warm climate, little clothing was needed. Women wore short skirts; men wore a malo (loincloth).

Pandanus leaves were widely used. Ornaments were made from wood, stone, shells, and animal bones. Tattooing was widespread. The most admired works were made from the feathers of tiny birds, used to create feathered helmets (mahiole) and cloaks (ʻahuʻula) for high chiefs.

Hawaiians had many games and pastimes, including heʻe nalu (wave sliding on wooden boards), which developed into modern surfing. A favorite pastime of chiefs was sledding down steep slopes on special sleds; ordinary children did this on coconut palm leaves. Fistfights, wrestling, and running were very popular. Military parades and battles were also spectacular events.

Many petroglyphs survive from the ancient Hawaiians. They had no written language before European contact, but poetry and oral folklore reached a high level of development.

=== Religion ===
Individuals who were ungodly, godless, irreligious, wicked, unbelieving, or careless of observance of taboos, were known as ʻaiā. However, the dominant religion as in many other Polynesian societies, was the kapu/taboo religion. It had a theology, ritual, and a code of conduct. It included many gods and heroes that people worshiped in different ways. In one tradition, Wākea, the Sky Father, wed Papahānaumoku, the Earth Mother and from their union came all Hawaiians, including the other gods. In traditional Pu-anue genealogy, Kumukumu-ke-kaa and her husband Paia-a-ka-lani were the mother and father of the earth and heavens. Another genealogy declared that Ka-mai-eli and Kumu-honua were the mother and father.

The kapu religion in Hawaii was polytheistic, led by the gods Kāne, Kū, Lono, and Kanaloa. Other notable deities included Laka, Kihawahine, Haumea, Papahānaumoku, and, most famously, Pele. Each Hawaiian family is considered to have one or more guardian spirits or family gods known as ʻaumakua. One such god is Iolani, the god of aliʻi.

One breakdown of the Kapu pantheon noted the following groups:

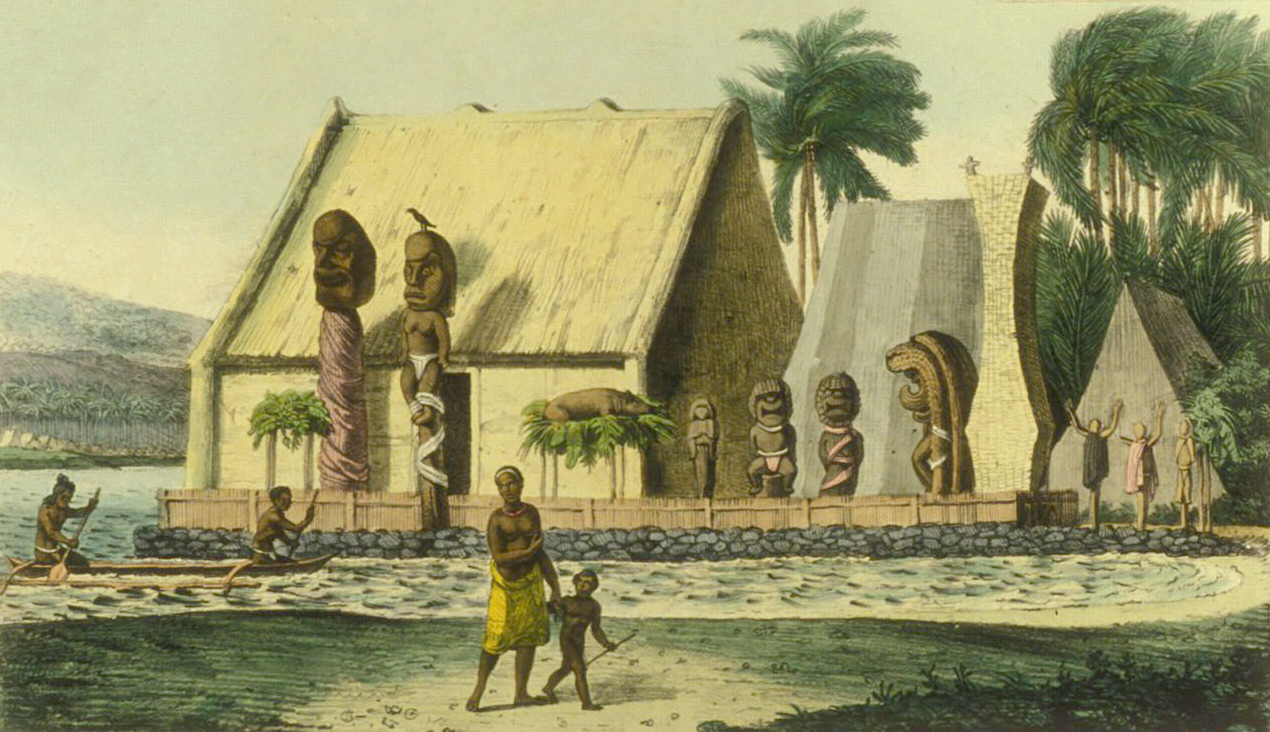
A depiction of a royal heiau (Hawaiian temple) at Kealakekua Bay

- four major gods (ka hā) – Kū, Kāne, Lono, Kanaloa
- forty male gods or aspects of Kāne (ke kanahā)
- four hundred gods and goddesses (ka lau)
- a multitude of gods and goddesses (ke kini akua)
- spirits (na ʻunihipili)
- guardians (na ʻaumākua)

Another breakdown consists of three major groups:

- four gods, or akua: Kū, Kāne, Lono, Kanaloa
- many lesser gods, or kupua, each associated with certain professions
- guardian spirits, ʻaumakua, associated with particular families

=== Rulers of Hawaii island ===
==== Līloa ====
Līloa was a legendary ruler of the island of Hawaii in the late 15th century. His royal compound was in Waipiʻo Valley. His line traces to Hawaiian creation.

Līloa had two sons; his firstborn Hākau from his wife/aunt Pinea, (his mother's sister), and his second son, ʻUmi a Līloa from his lesser wife, Akahi a Kuleana. Upon his death, Hākau became ruler and delegated religious authority to ʻUmi. Akahi a Kuleana was of a lesser line of chiefs who Līloa had fallen in love with when he discovered her bathing in a river. The couple met when Līloa was visiting Hamakua. He asserted his right to her as King and she accepted.

Līloa's Kāʻei is his sacred feathered sash, now kept at the Bishop Museum.

Līloa was the first son of Kiha nui lulu moku who descended from Hāna laʻa nui. Līloa's mother, Waioloa, his grandmother, Neʻula and great-grandmother, Laʻa kapu were of the ʻEwa aliʻi lines of Oahu. Līloa's father ruled Hawaii as aliʻi nui and upon his death elevated Līloa. Kiha had had four other sons, Kaunuamoa, Makaoku, Kepailiula and Hoolana, whose descendants are the Kaiakea family of Molokai, distant relatives of Abraham Fornander's daughter.

==== Hākau ====
Just before his death, Līloa elevated Hākau as Chief, telling Umi that he was to serve as his "man" (Prime Minister) and that each was to respect the other and should either have issue with the other it would be for them to decide. At first a decent king, Hākau soon became brutal. To avoid his brother's anger, ʻUmi exiled himself to another district.

Hākau refused to help Nunu and Ka-hohe, his father's two favorites, ailing Kahuna who had requested food. This was considered highly insulting. The two were of Lono's priestly class. They resented their treatment and plotted to see the kingdom in someone else's hand. Hākau did not believe the priests to have any power and showed them no respect as ʻUmi was the spiritual authority. In this period no King could defy a Kahuna. Many had a royal bloodline, land and could leave their temples as warriors when needed, but could never relinquish their spiritual responsibilities. Through a messenger of Kaoleioku, of Waipunalei, the high-priest of the temple of Manini, the two priests contacted Umi's court at Koholalele. The two priests traveled to Waipunalei where they supported Umi's revolt.

When Hākau received news that his brother was preparing to war against him, he sent his main forces to prepare by seeking feathers to adorn their regalia. After the warriors had left and Hākau was undefended, Umi's warriors came forward claiming that they bore offerings for the king. They dropped the bundles and used the rocks within to stone Hākau to death.

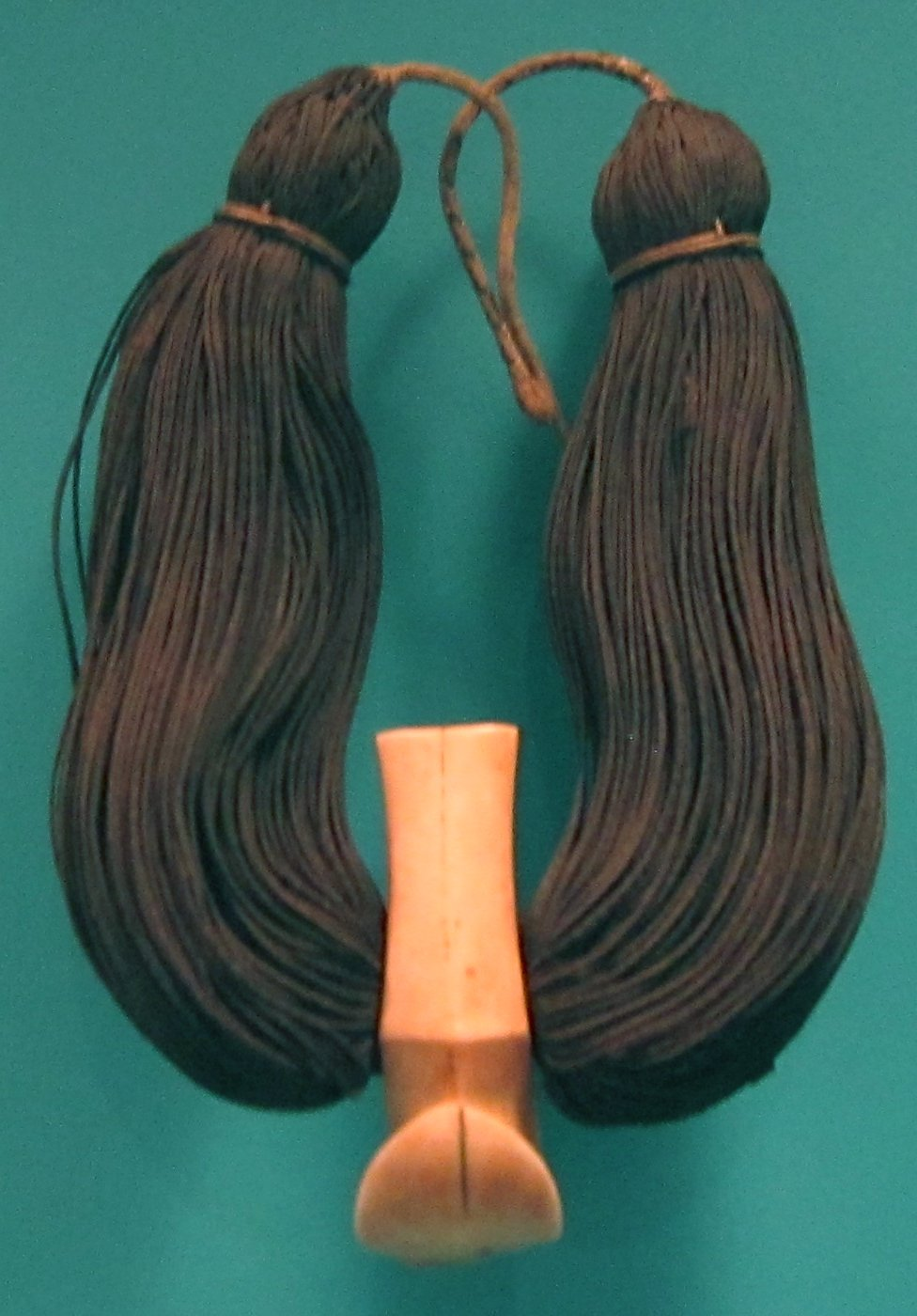
Umi was given a number of royal tokens to prove he was the son of Līloa, including a Niho Palaoa. The lei (necklace) was made of braided human hair and whale bone.

==== ʻUmi-a-Līloa ====
ʻUmi-a-Līloa was a ruling aliʻi ai moku (district high chief of Hawaiʻi). He became chief after his half brother's death and was considered a just ruler, religious and the first to unite most of the Hawaii Island. The legend of ʻUmi-a-Līloa is one of Hawaii's most popular hero sagas.

ʻUmi's wife was Princess Piʻikea, daughter of Piʻilani. They had one son, Kumalae, and one daughter, Aihākōkō.

Līloa told Akahi that, if she were to have a male child, she should present the boy to him along with royal tokens he gave her as gifts, to prove her boy was the son of the king. Akahi hid the tokens from her husband and later gave birth to a son. At the age of 15 or 16, his stepfather was punishing the boy when his mother intervened and told the man not to touch him because the boy was his lord and chief. She uncovered the tokens to present to her husband to prove the high treason he would have committed. Akahi gave her son the royal malo and lei niho palaoa given to her by ʻUmi's biological father. Only high chiefs wore these items. She sent ʻUmi to Waipiʻo Valley to present himself to the king as his son.

Līloa's palace was guarded and attended by several Kahuna. The entire enclosure was sacred. Entering without permission carried the death penalty. ʻUmi entered the enclosure with attendants afraid to stop someone wearing the royal insignia and walked straight to Līloa's sleeping quarters, waking him there. When Līloa asked who he was, he said "It is I, ʻUmi your son". He then placed tokens at his father's feet and Līloa proclaimed him to be his son. After learning of ʻUmi, Hākau became upset. Līloa assured his first born that he would be king after his death and that his brother would serve him. ʻUmi was brought to court on an equal footing with Hākau. ʻUmi found great favor from his father, increasing Hākau's dislike.

In exile, ʻUmi took wives and began building forces and followers. Chiefs began to see him as of the highest chiefly nature from signs they observed. He gave food to people and became known for caring for all.

After Hākau's death the other aliʻi claimed their districts for themselves. ʻUmi took the advice of the two priests by marrying many women of high noble rank, including his half sister Kapukini and the daughter of the ruler of Hilo, where he had been given sanctuary during Hākau's reign. Eventually ʻUmi conquered the entire island.

After unifying the island of Hawaii, ʻUmi was faithful to those who had supported him, and allowed his three most faithful companions, and the two Kahuna who had aided him, to help him govern.

=== Aikāne ===
Aikāne relationships or (mostly male) homosexual or bisexual activity in the pre-colonial era was an accepted tradition. These relationships were accepted as part of Hawaiian culture. Such sexual relationships may have begun as teenagers and continued thereafter, even though they also had heterosexual partners. Cook and his associates provided extensive eyewitness accounts and analyses of such young men. These Aikane men were connected to chiefs whose functions were sexual, social, and political. The Hawaiian aikāne relationship was a part of Hawaiian noble life, including that of Kamehameha I. Some myths refer to women's desires and therefore some women may have been involved in aikāne relationships. Līloa originated this practice among the aliʻi, which was then copied by the other classes. Warriors engaged in the practice. In many cases, the men involved felt it an honor and responsibility to honor their hana lawelawe.

Lieutenant James King stated that "all the chiefs had them" and recounted a tale that Cook was asked by one chief to leave King behind, as a great honor. American adventurer and sailor John Ledyard commented in detail about the tradition.

=== Land division system ===
Land was divided in accord with the wishes of the Aliʻi Nui. The system had four hierarchical levels:

- mokupuni (island)
- moku (subdivision of an island)
- ahupuaʻa (subdivision of moku)
- ʻili (two or three per ahupuaʻa, but Kahoʻolawe for example had eight)

Some oral history relates that ʻUmi a Līloa created the ahupuaʻa system.

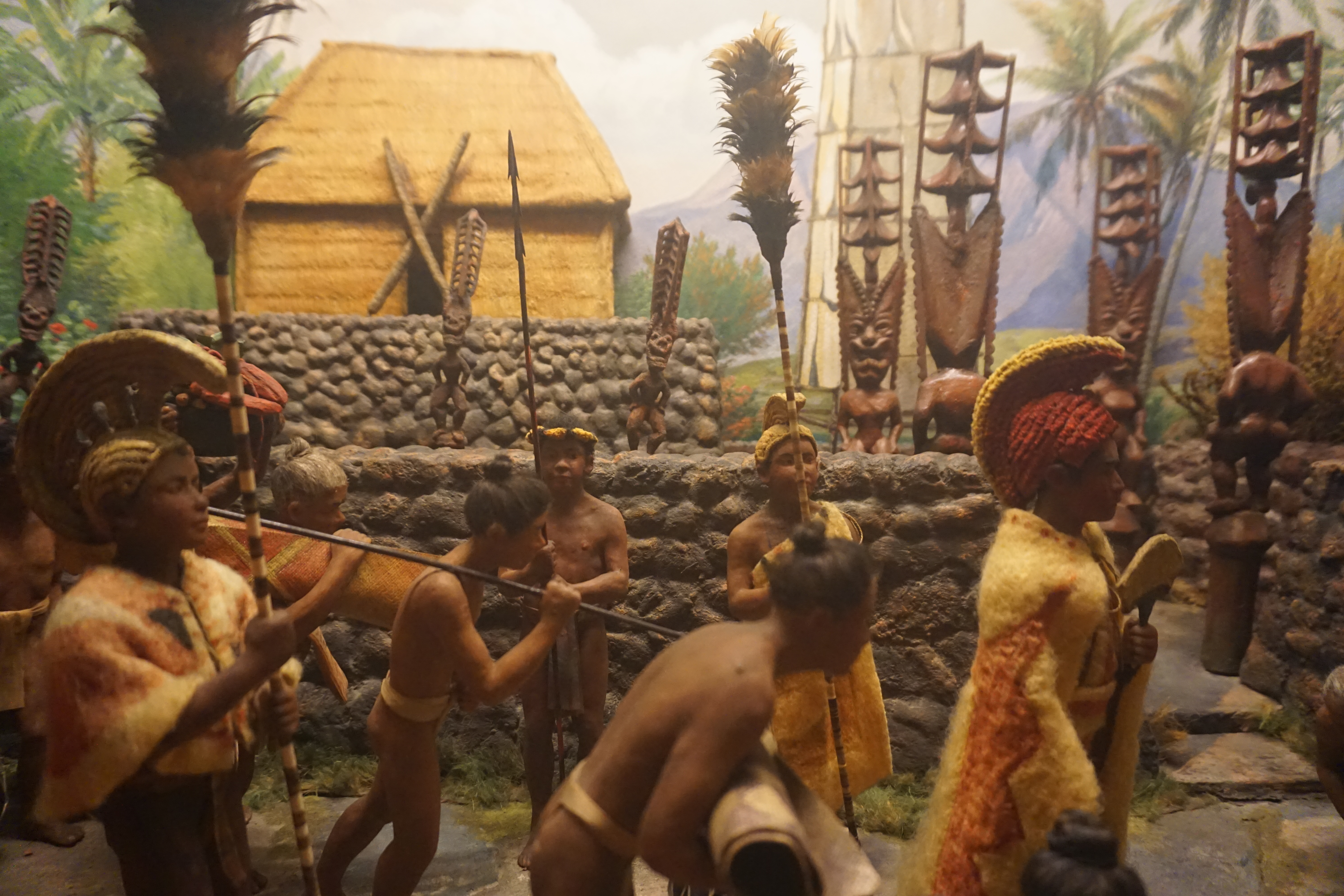
The Religion, Hawaiian Islands, Northern Polynesia diorama in the Oceania exhibit at the Milwaukee Public Museum

Each ahupuaʻa included a lowland mala and upland forested region. The divisions typically went from the ridge top to the coast, often following the boundary of a stream. Ahupuaʻa varied in size depending on the economic means of the location and political divisions of the area. The system exploited the fact that communities were organized along stream systems. The community governance system of Kānāwai is attributed specifically to shared water usage.

Each ahupuaʻa was divided into ʻili that in turn were divided into kuleana, individual plots of land that were cultivated by commoners who paid taxes to the land overseer each week. These taxes went to support the chief. Possible reasons for this radial division include:

- travel: in many areas, it is easier to travel up- and downstream than from valley to valley.
- economy: having all climate and economic exploitation zones in each land division ensured that each could be self-sufficient for much of its needs.

"As the native Hawaiians used the resources within their ahupuaʻa, they practiced aloha (respect), laulima (cooperation) and malama (stewardship), which resulted in a desirable pono (balance)". The Hawaiians believed that the land, the sea, the clouds and all of nature were interconnected, which is why they used these resources to reach the desired balance in life. Sustainability was maintained by the konohiki and kahuna (priests who restricted the fishing of certain species during specific seasons). They also regulated the gathering of plants.

Ahupuaʻa is derived from the Hawaiian words ahu (heap, cairn) and puaʻa (pig). Ahupuaʻa boundary markers were traditionally heaps of stones used to hold offers (typically a pig) to the island chief.

=== Agriculture ===
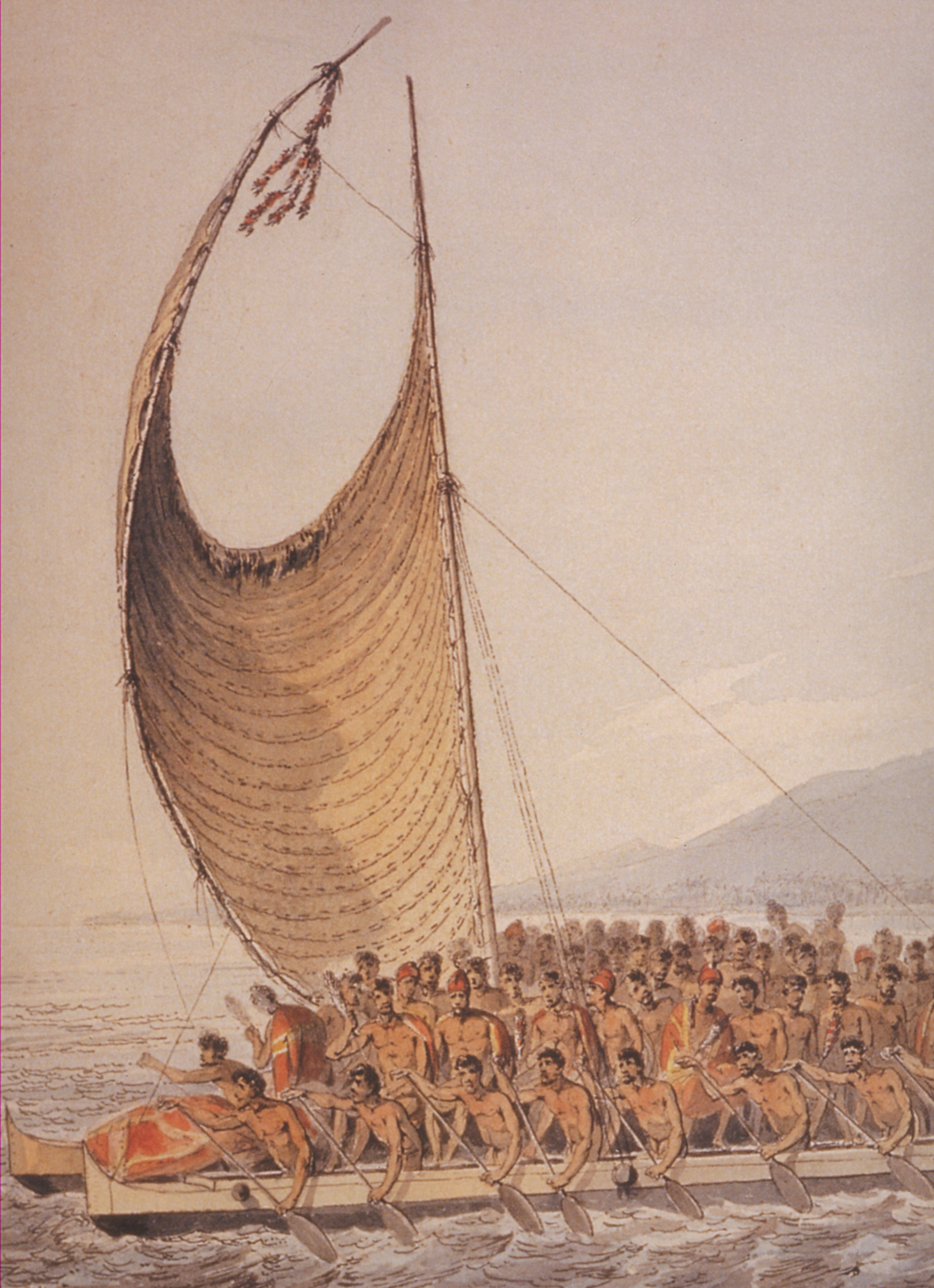
Kalaniōpuʻu, King of Owyhee bringing Presents to Captain Cook, by John Webber c. 1781

The Hawaiian agricultural system used both irrigated and rain-fed (dryland) systems. Irrigated systems mainly supported taro (kalo) cultivation. Rain-fed systems were known as the mala. There they cultivated uala (sweet potatoes), yams, and dryland taro along with niu (coconuts), ʻulu (breadfruit), maiʻa (bananas) and ko (sugarcane). The kukui tree (Aleurites moluccanus) was sometimes used as shade to protect mala. Each crop was cultivated in an area most suitable to its needs.

Hawaiians kept dogs, chickens, and pigs. They grew personal gardens at home. Water was important to Hawaiian life; it was used for fishing, bathing, drinking, and gardening, and for loko iʻa (fishpond aquaculture systems).

==== Governance ====
The Kingdom was administered by an aliʻi chief. Divisions were under the control of other smaller chiefs and managed by a steward. The headman of a land division or ahupuaʻa is a konohiki. Mokus were ruled by an aliʻi ʻaimoku. Ahupuaʻas were run by a headman or chief called a Konohiki.

=== Konohiki ===
In the Keelikolani vs Robinson court case, kononiki is defined as land agent. In the Territory vs Bishop Trust Co. LTD. case, when the agent was appointed by a chief, they were referred to as konohiki. The term also referred to a designated area of land owned privately (not by the government). A konohiki retained life tenure on the land even when discharged from the position, but a head man overseeing the same land had no such protection.

Often aliʻi and konohiki are treated synonymously. However, while most konohiki were aliʻi, not all aliʻi were konohiki. A konohiki could also be a headman of a land division or to describe fishing rights. Kono means to entice or prompt. Hiki refers to something that can be done. They oversaw the property, managing water rights, land distribution, agricultural use and any maintenance. Konohiki also ensured that the right amounts of gifts and tribute were properly made at the right times.

As capitalism was incorporated into the kingdom, konohiki became tax collectors, landlords, and fishery wardens.

=== End of Kapu ===
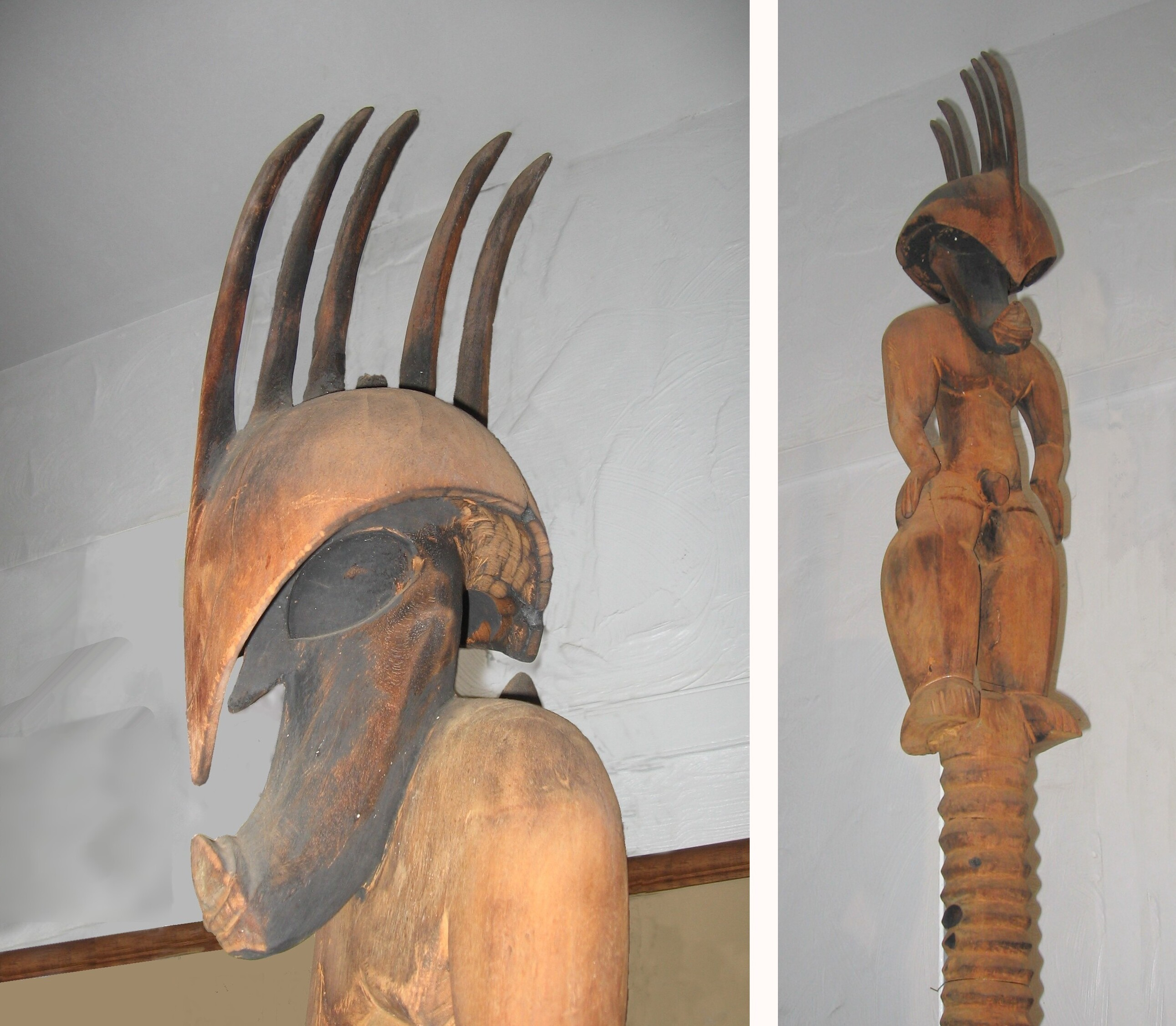
Kamapuaʻa statue: a wooden sculpture of the Hawaiian demi-god, created before the early 19th-century purge of the indigenous Hawaiian religion

Hawaiians overthrew the kapu theocracy in 1819 by themselves, before the missionaries' arrival. On October 4, 1819, Kamehameha II dined with Queen Kaʻahumanu, Kamehameha I's favored wife, and his own mother, Queen Keopuolani. The prohibition on men and women eating together, the ʻai kapu, was one of the most ancient kapu or prohibitions: the penalty for its violation was death. Queen Kaʻahumanu, however, despised the prohibition as it prevented her from entering certain religious temples where men made decisions over meals. Queen Keopuolani also violated the prohibition even before the public breaking. Violating ʻai kapu at a public dinner, as Kamehameha II did, was a clear signal that the kapu system was abolished. The guests at the dinner cried out ai noa! (free eating). Afterwards, Kamehameha II – with the support of his high priest Hewahewa – ordered the destruction of the heiau temples. Afterwards, Kamehameha I's nephew, Kekuaokalani launched a brief civil war. His forces were defeated by Kamehameha II's at Kuamoʻo, reinforcing the new way.

==== Possible European contact before 1778 ====
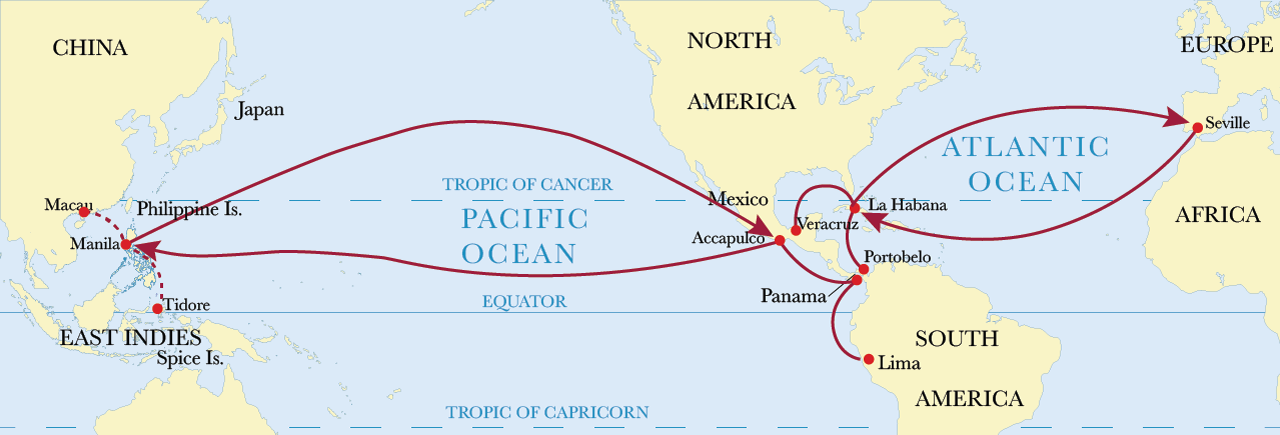
Manila-Acapulco galleon trade route, showing onward route to Spain

From 1565 to 1815, Spanish trading ships, or galleons, crossed the Pacific along a route from Acapulco in New Spain (modern Mexico) to Manila in Spanish Philippines. They made this trip once or twice yearly using a route kept secret to protect the Spanish trade monopoly against competing powers. Some sources speculate that sightings of, or interaction with, Hawaii must have occurred.

“It seems improbable that Spanish mariners could have made several hundred trips … without becoming Hawaii’s first European discoverers.”

By 1589, Ortelius was publishing the Maris Pacifici first ever Pacific map featuring an intriguing resemblance of the Hawaiian Islands "Los Bolcanes" and "La Farfania" in the middle of the Pacific by the Tropic of Cancer.

In 1743, British Commodore George Anson captured a Spanish galleon on which he found a chart of the Pacific that depicted a group of islands at the same latitude as the Hawaiian islands but with a longitude ten degrees to the east. One of these islands is labeled La Mesa ('the Table'). This is conjectured to be Hawaii Island since this “agrees very well with the appearance of Mauna Loa ... when seen at a great distance”.

Many scholars have refuted claims of Spanish knowledge of Hawaii during this period. However, based on accounts from native Hawaiian oral tradition, Oskar Spate leaves open the possibility of one-way contact and that it is "likely that Spanish castaways reached Hawaii and survived".

=== Arrival and death of James Cook ===
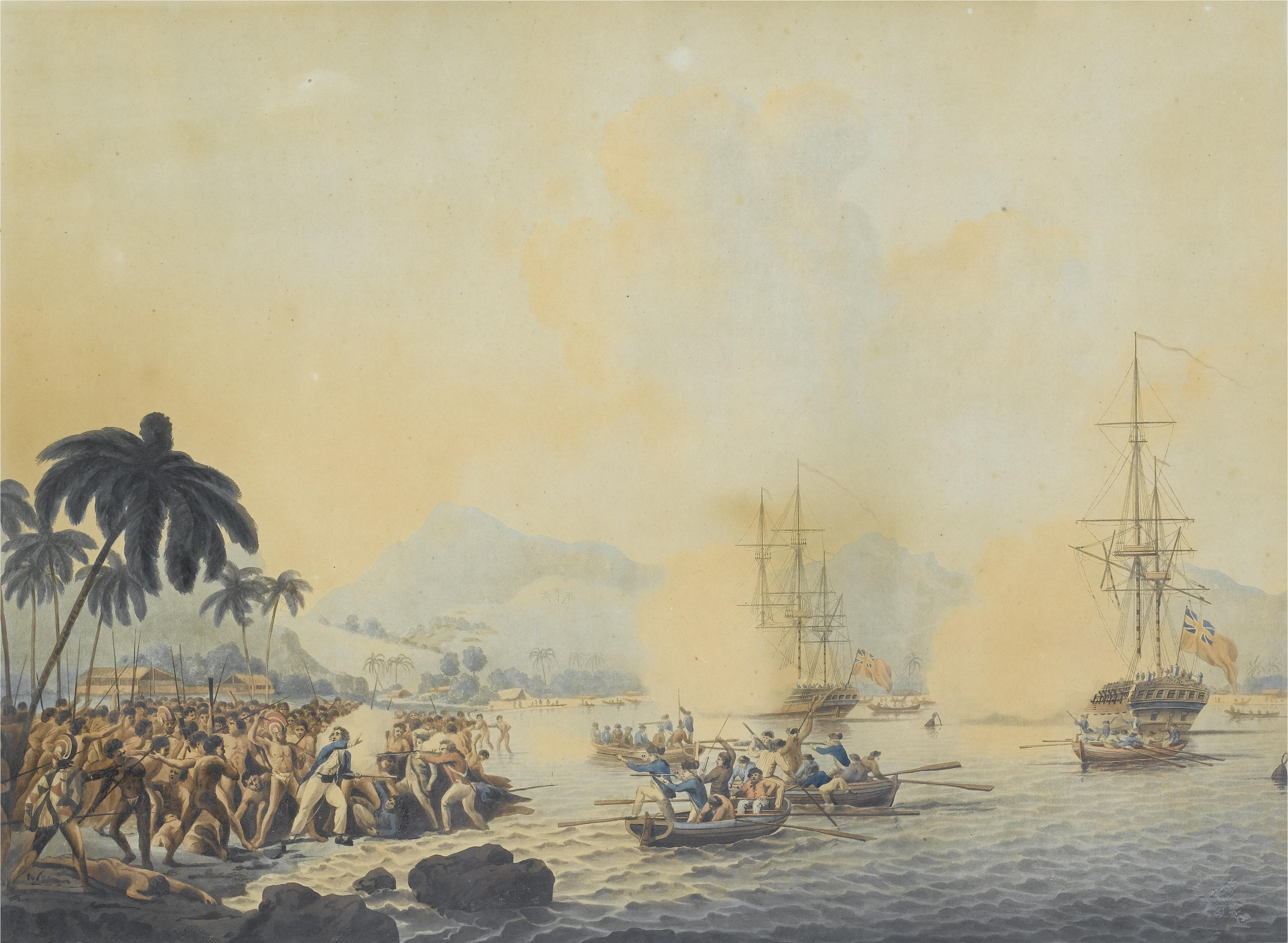
HMS Resolution and HMS Discovery. On February 14, 1779, Capt. James Cook was killed on the island of Hawaii.

Between 1768 and 1779, Captain James Cook led three voyages to chart unknown seas for Great Britain. While crossing the Pacific on his third voyage, he serendipitously encountered the Hawaiian Islands on January 18, 1778, the first documented contact by a European explorer. He first anchored off the coast of Kauai and met local inhabitants to trade and obtain water and food for his onward voyage. On February 2, 1778, Cook continued on to the North American continent, searching for a Northwest Passage for approximately nine months. After failing to find any passage, he decided to use the Hawaiian Islands as a base to over-winter and resupply before a second attempt the next season. His two ships first encountered the coast of Maui in November 1778, and eventually anchored in Kealakekua Bay on the west coast of Hawaii Island in mid January. Initially, the reception of the local people was respectful, friendly and accommodating. The expedition departed Kealakekua on Feb 4, but was forced to return again after a few days to make essential repairs after a storm severely damaged a mast. Relations with the local people now grew hostile and Cook was among those killed when a dispute led to violence.

After Cook's visit and the publication of several books relating his voyages, the Hawaiian Islands attracted many European and American explorers, traders, and whalers, who found the islands to be a convenient harbor and source of supplies. This began to influence the trajectory of Hawaiian history. The introduction of sexually transmitted diseases are attributed with certainty to the voyages of Cook, However, after the first visits of the Discovery and Resolution to "Mowee (Maui) and Ouwhyee (Hawaii)" and finding "that the venereal disease was not unknown to the natives," Cook himself believed "that the disease was not left at these islands by our ships."

== Kingdom of Hawaii ==
The Kingdom of Hawaii lasted from 1795 until its overthrow in 1893 with the fall of the House of Kalakaua.

=== Kamehameha dynasty (1795–1874) ===
==== Kamehameha I ====
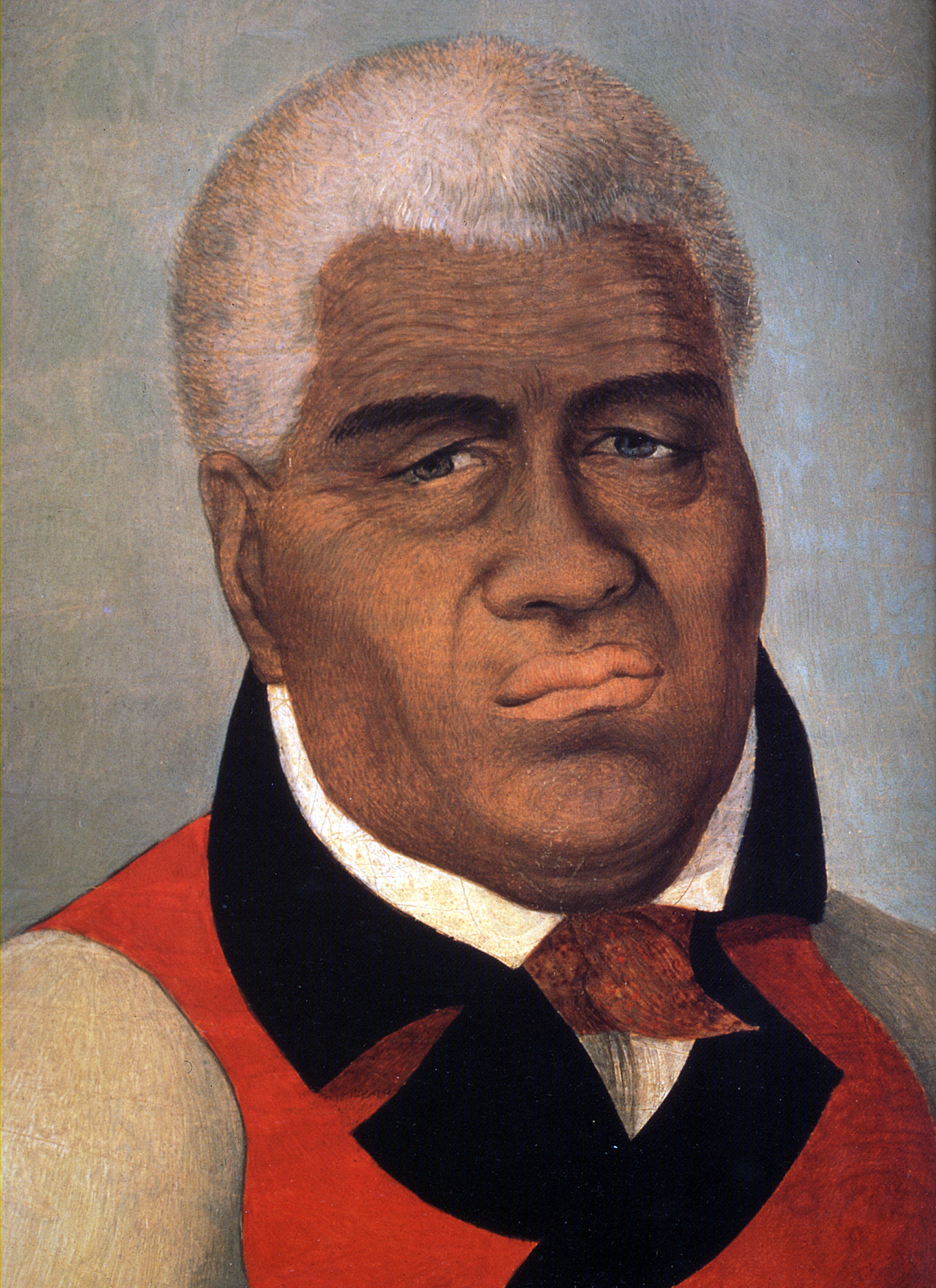
Kamehameha I, founder of the Kingdom of Hawaii

The first king to unite the Hawaiian Islands was Kamehameha I, founder of the House of Kamehameha and the Kingdom of Hawaiʻi.

His lineage can be traced to half brothers, Kalaniʻōpuʻu and Keōua. Kalaniʻōpuʻu's father was Kalaninuiʻīamamao while Keōua's father was Kalanikeʻeaumoku, both sons of Keaweʻīkekahialiʻiokamoku. They shared a common mother, Kamakaʻīmoku. Both brothers served Alapaʻinui, the ruling King of Hawaii Island. Kamehameha I was born to Keōua and Kekuʻiapoiwa II, a granddaughter of Keaweʻīkehakialiʻiokamoku. Hawaiian genealogy leaves the possibility that Kahekili II might have actually been Kamehameha I's biological father. However, Keōua acknowledged him as his son and this relationship is recognized by official genealogies.

The date of Kamehameha I's birth is uncertain. The traditional ole chant of Keaka, wife of Alapaʻinui, indicates that Kamehameha I was born in ikuwā (winter) around November. Kamehameha was allegedly born during the passing of Halley's Comet. In Hawaiian culture a comet indicated an important birth. Samuel Kamakau, wrote, "It was during the time of the warfare among the chiefs of [the island of] Hawaii which followed the death of Keawe, chief over the whole island, that Kamehameha I was born". However, his general dating was challenged. Abraham Fornander wrote, "when Kamehameha died in 1819 he was past eighty years old. His birth would thus fall between 1736 and 1740, probably nearer the former". William De Witt Alexander listed the birth year as 1736. He was first named Paiea but took the name Kamehameha, meaning "The very lonely one" or "The one set alone".

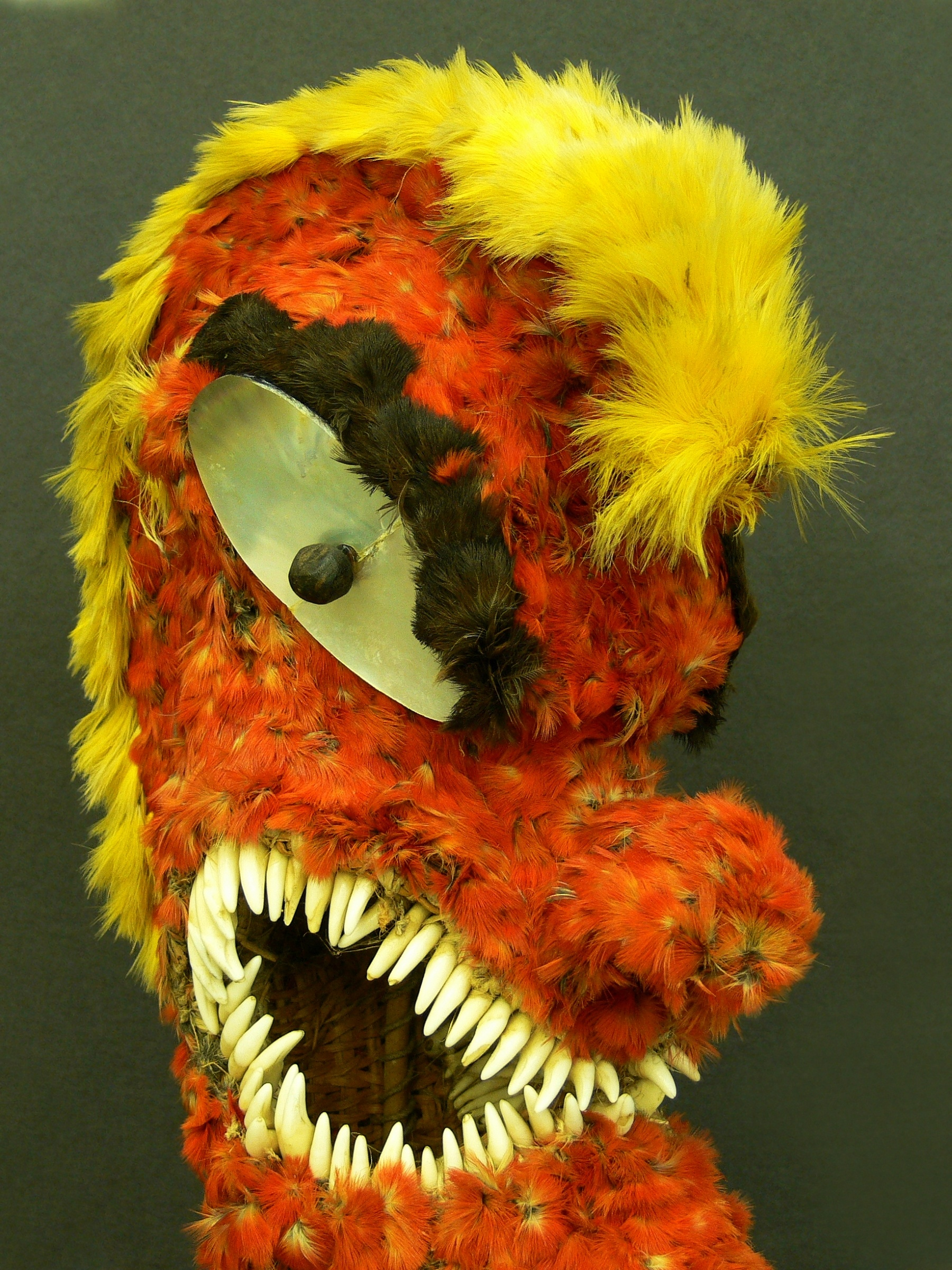
This sculpture of the god Kū-ka-ili-moku was left to Kamehameha I by his uncle Kalaniʻōpuʻu

Hawaiian prophecy said that this baby would one day unite the islands. Alapaʻi gave the young Kamehameha to his wife Keaka and her sister Hākau to care for. Kamehameha's uncle Kalaniʻōpuʻu raised him after Keōua's death. Kalaniʻōpuʻu ruled Hawaii as had his grandfather Keawe. He had advisors and priests. When word reached the ruler that chiefs were planning to murder the boy, he told Kamehameha:

"My child, I have heard the secret complaints of the chiefs and their mutterings that they will take you and kill you, perhaps soon. While I am alive they are afraid, but when I die they will take you and kill you. I advise you to go back to Kohala." "I have left you the god; there is your wealth."

After Kalaniʻōpuʻu's death in 1782, Kīwalaʻō took his father's place as first born and ruled the island, while Kamehameha I became the religious authority. Some chiefs preferred Kamehameha I and war broke out to overthrow Kīwalaʻō. Kīwalaʻō was killed in the Battle of Mokuʻōhai. This marked the start of a 15-year-long military campaign by Kamehameha I to conquer not only the island of Hawaii from Keōua and Kīwalaʻō's uncle Keawemaʻuhili, but all the Hawaiian islands from the various chiefs who ruled them.

Animation of the unification of Hawaii, from Kalaniʻōpuʻu's death in 1782 to Kaumaliʻi's submission in 1810

In 1791, after Keōua killed Keawemaʻuhili and claimed his territory, Kamehameha I sent envoys for Keōua and his brother Kaōleiokū to meet with him. Keōua and Kaōleiokū arrived in separate canoes. Keōua came to shore first where a fight broke out and he and all aboard were killed. Before the same could happen to the second canoe, Kamehameha I intervened. With the death of Keōua, Kamehameha I became king of the entire island.

On February 25, 1794, during his voyage of exploration, Captain George Vancouver negotiated with Kamehameha what the British understood to be the cession of the island of Hawaii to Great Britain though historians have argued that the Hawaiians regarded the agreement as the establishment of a protectorate. At that time, Kamehameha - who was king of Hawaii Island - also sought military help in the ongoing war against Maui and the other islands; the British were already assisting him with the construction of a warship. Vancouver presented Kamehameha with a British flag which flew unofficially as Hawaii's flag until 1816. The modern Flag of Hawaii retains a Union Jack in the top-left corner as a legacy of this time.

In 1794, Kahekili II, the king of Maui and Oahu and suzerain of Kauai, died and left his territory to his brother Kāʻeokūlani and his son Kalanikūpule. A civil war between the two broke out, which ended when Kalanikūpule killed Kāʻeokūlani, taking control of Maui and Molokaʻi. This initiated a succession crisis on Kauaʻi, which had previously been ruled by Kāʻeokūlani. Seeing an opportunity, Kamehameha I invaded Kalanikūpule. He quickly took Maui and Molokai before moving onto Oahu. Here he defeated the remainder of Kalanikūpule's forces at the decisive Battle of Nuʻuanu.

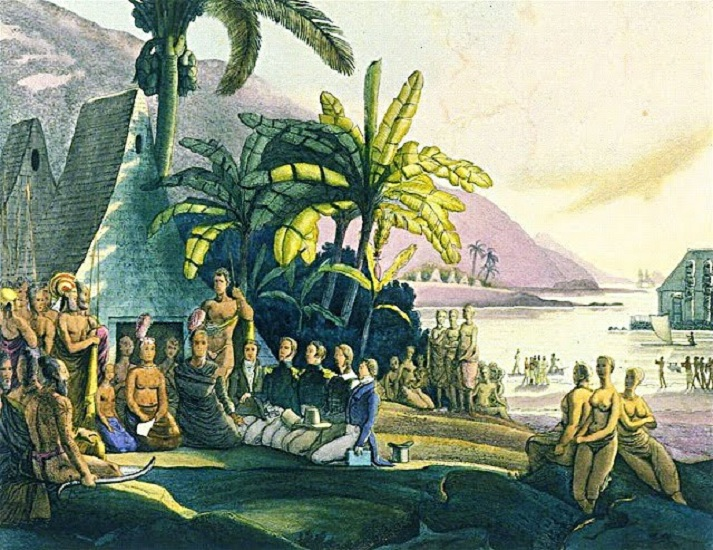
King Kamehameha I receiving the Russian naval expedition of Otto von Kotzebue. Drawing by Louis Choris in 1816.

He thus extended his kingdom to encompass all of the main islands except Kauai and Niihau (both part of the Kingdom of Kauai). For his first royal residence, the new King built the first western-style structure in the Hawaiian Islands, known as the "Brick Palace". The location became the seat of government until 1845. The structure was built at Keawaʻiki point in Lahaina, Maui. Two ex-convicts from Australia's Botany Bay penal colony built the home. It was begun in 1798 and was completed in 1802. The house was intended for Kaʻahumanu, but she rejected it in favor of an adjacent, traditional home.

On January 1806, a Japanese ship named the Inawaka-maru (稲若丸) chartered by the Kikkawa clan to deliver cargo and several Kikkawa officials ran into a freak snowstorm en route from Hiroshima to Edo (modern Tokyo) that caused her to adrift far into the Pacific; they were sighted by the American ship Tabour who rescued and handed them over to Kamehameha I while docking in Oʻahu on May 5. They stayed under the king's protection until August when they were able to procure a ship captained by Amasa Delano back on an arduous journey home to Japan. The sole survivor of this voyage home, sailor Hirahara Zenmatsu, recounted all his first-hand observations of native Hawaiian life during their stay to his daimyō Asano Narikata compiled as the Iban Hyoryu Kikokuroku (夷蛮漂流歸國録), the only such record by a non-Westerner.

After two failed attempts to invade Kauai (in 1795 and 1804), in 1810 Kamehameha negotiated the peaceful absorption of Kauai into his kingdom. The king of Kauai, Kaumualiʻi, agreed to recognize Kamehameha as his suzerain, and in exchange was allowed to continue administering Kauai. Thus concluded the unification of the Hawaiian islands.

Kamehameha I had many wives, but held two in the highest regard. Keōpūolani was the highest ranking aliʻi of her time and mother to his sons, Liholiho and Kauikeaouli. Kaʻahumanu was his favorite. Kamehameha I died in 1819, succeeded by Liholiho.

=== Kamehameha II ===
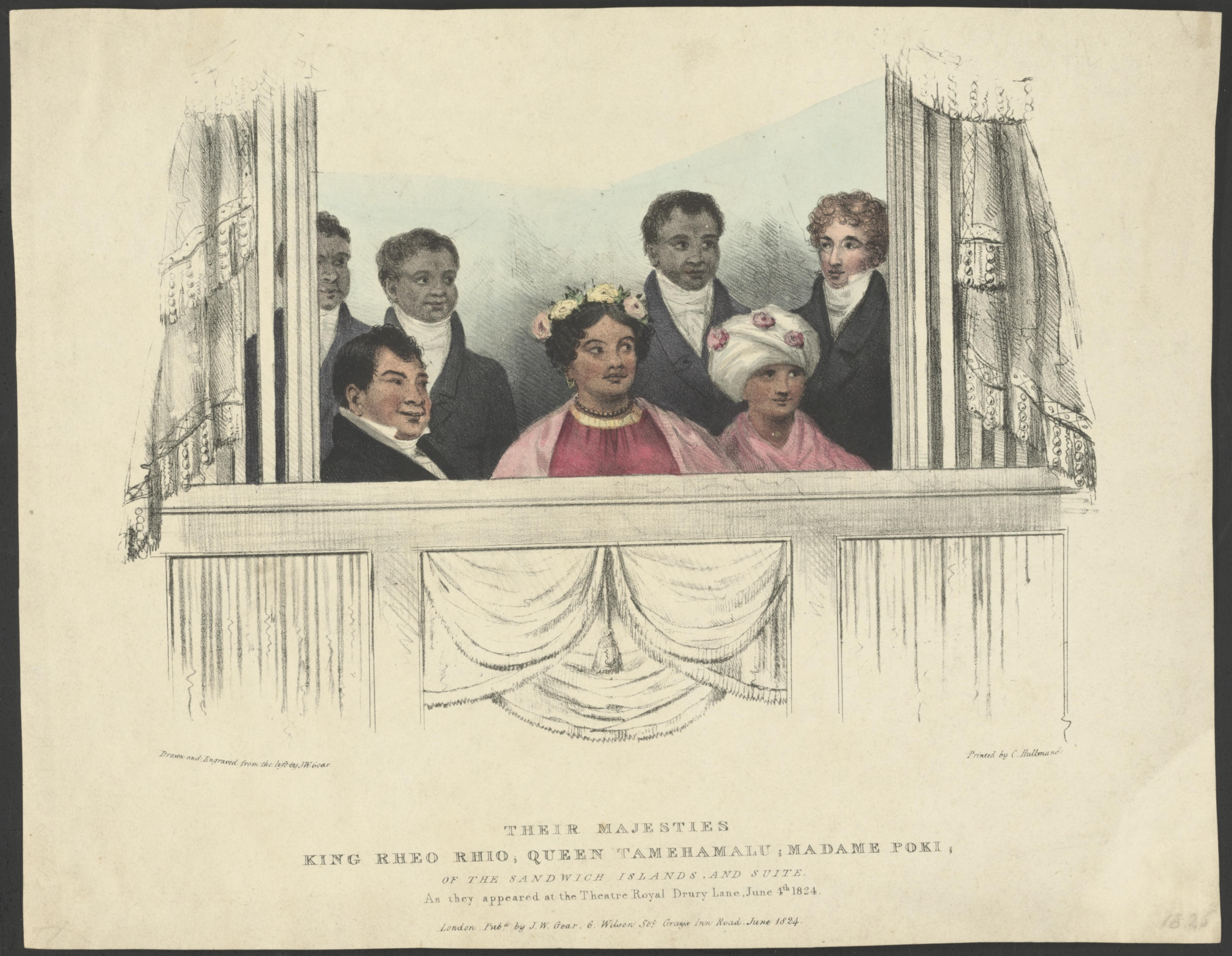
Kamehameha II in England with Queen and entourage

After Kamehameha I's death, Liholiho left Kailua for a week and returned to be crowned king. At the ceremony, attended by commoners and nobles, he approached the circle of chiefs, as Kaʻahumanu, the central figure in the group and Dowager Queen, said, "Hear me O Divine one, for I make known to you the will of your father. Behold these chiefs and the men of your father, and these your guns, and this your land, but you and I shall share the realm together". Liholiho agreed officially, which began a unique system of dual-government consisting of a King and co-ruler similar to a regent.

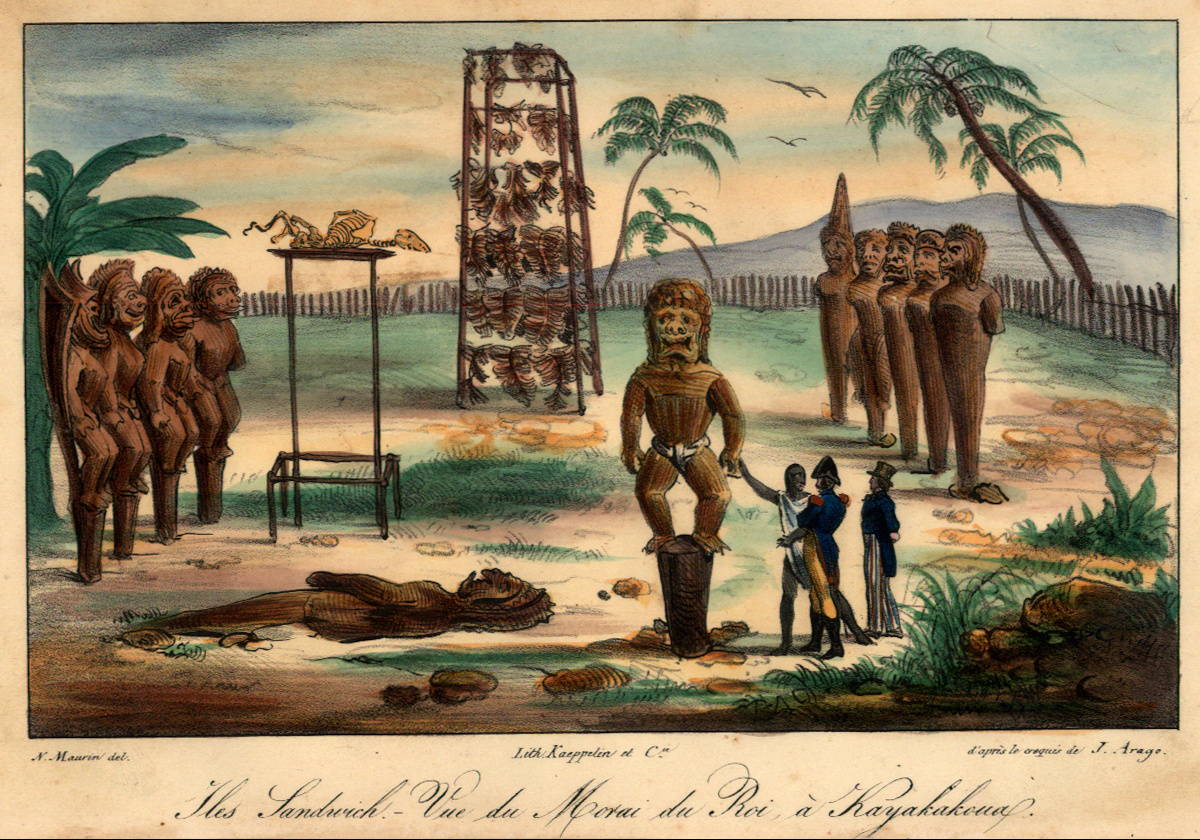
1819 lithograph shows a Hawaiian heiau and a French naval reception. The Hawaiian figure's exaggerated dark skin, enlarged red lips, and a stereotyped posture, reflects a 19th‑century European racial caricature used to exoticize and otherize Pacific peoples during the colonial era.

Kamehameha II shared his rule with his stepmother, Kaʻahumanu. She defied Hawaiian kapu by dining with the young king, leading to the end of the Hawaiian religion (the period known as ʻAi Noa). Some Hawaiian leaders opposed the efforts to abolish the Hawaiian religion. A faction led by Keaoua Kekuaokalani, a nephew of Kamehameha I, revolted against Kamehameha II and his court. Despite gathering some support, the rebels were defeated at the Battle of Kuamoʻo in December 1819.

Kamehameha II died, along with his wife, Queen Kamāmalu in 1824 on a state visit to England, succumbing to measles. He was King for 5 years.

The couple's remains were returned to Hawaii by Boki. Aboard the ship The Blond, his wife Liliha and Kekūanaōʻa were baptized as Christians. Kaʻahumanu also converted and became a powerful Christian influence on Hawaiian society until her death in 1832. Since the new king was only 12 years old, Kaʻahumanu reigned as senior ruler and named Boki as her Kuhina Nui.

Boki left Hawaii on a trip to find sandalwood to cover a debt and was lost at sea. His wife, Liliha took the governorship of Maui and unsuccessfully attempted to revolt against Kaʻahumanu, who upon Boki's departure, had installed Kīnaʻu as a co-governor.

=== Kaʻahumanu ===
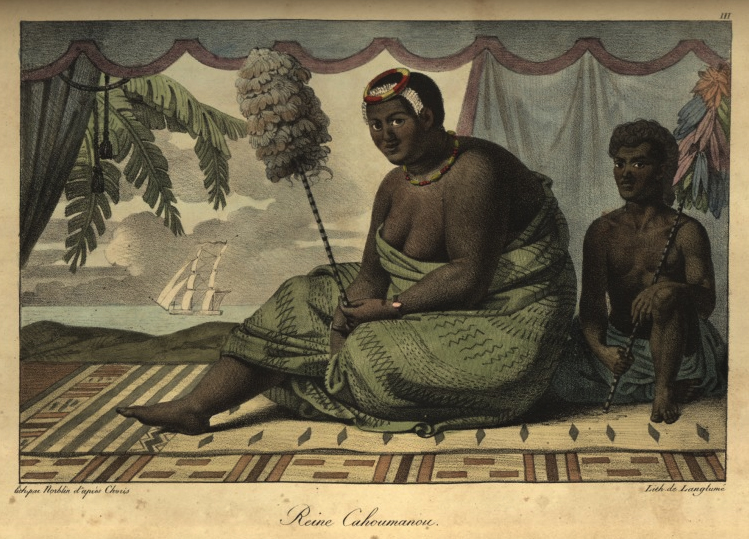
Kaʻahumanu with Charles Kanaʻina

Kaʻahumanu was born on Maui around 1777. Her parents were aliʻi of a lower-ranking line. She became Kamehameha's consort at fourteen. George Vancouver states: "[O]ne of the finest woman we had yet seen on any of the islands". To wed the young woman, Kamehameha had to consent to make her children his heirs, but she had no issue.

Before his death, Kamehameha selected Kaʻahumanu to rule along with his son. Kaʻahumanu adopted the boy. She became the senior ruler. A portrait artist remarked of her: "This Old Dame is the most proud, unbending Lady in the whole island. As the widow of [Kamehameha], she possesses unbound authority and respect, not any of which she is inclined to lay aside on any occasion whatsoever". She was one of Hawaii's most influential leaders.

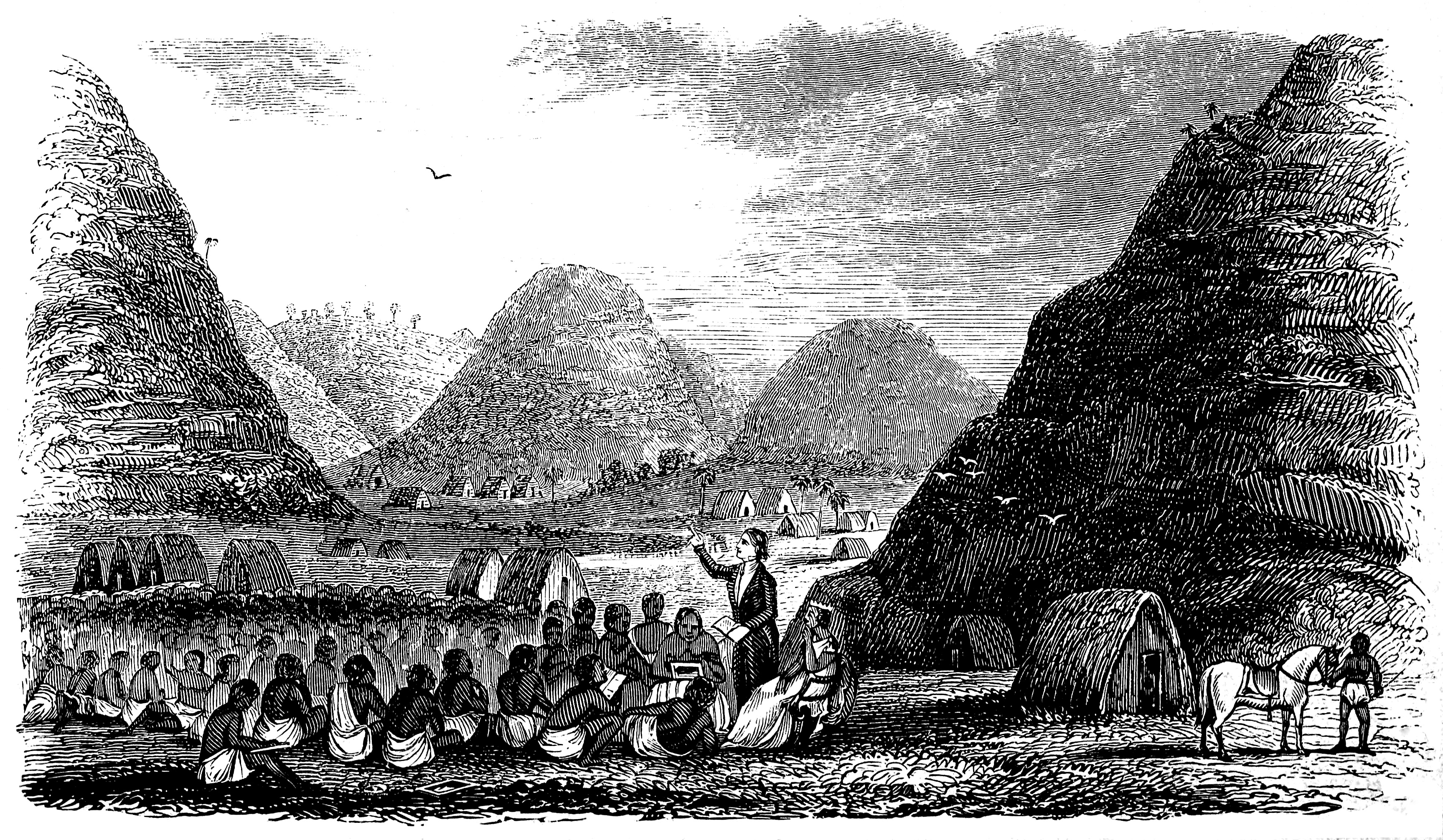
Hiram Bingham preaching to Queen Kaʻahumanu at Waimea in 1826

On March 30, 1820, fourteen American Protestant missionaries (the Pioneer Company) arrived in Hawaii. They were sent by the American Board of Commissioners for Foreign Missions. Over the course of a little over 40-years (1820-1863 – the “Missionary Period”), about 180-men and women sent by the American Board of Commissioners for Foreign Missions in twelve Companies served in Hawaii. They converted Hawaiian people to the Christian faith, developed the written form of Hawaiian language, and encouraged the spread of English on the islands. But many Hawaiians blame the missionaries for discouraging many Hawaiian cultural practices.

In April 1824, Kaʻahumanu publicly acknowledged her conversion to Protestant Christianity and encouraged her subjects to be baptized into the faith. She took it upon herself to enforce Christian policies with her power, banning of the Hawaiian Dance hula in 1830.

==== Kamehameha III ====
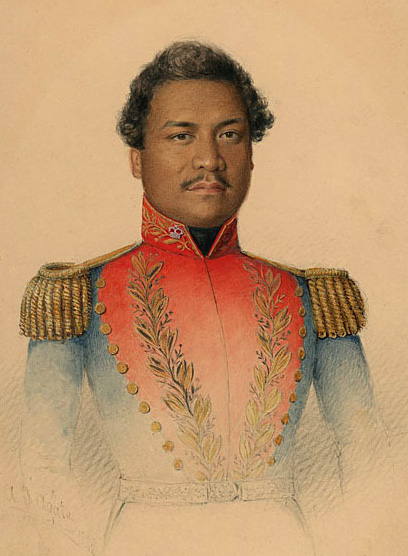
Picture of King Kamehameha III

Kauikeaouli was the second son of Kamehameha I and was born in Keauhou Bay on the island of Hawai'i. Kauikeaouli's birthdate is not known, but historians estimated it to be on March 17, 1814, making him about 14 years younger than Liholiho. After his birth, Kuakini refused to take him, because Kauikeaouli appeared to be lifeless. However, the prophet of another chief declared that the baby would live. They cleaned him and put him on a sacred area where the seer fanned him and sprinkled him with water while reciting a prayer. The baby started to move and make sounds. Kaikioewa was chosen as the baby's guardian and raised him in a remote location.

Kauikeaouli became King after Liholiho's death in 1824. Kamehameha III began the writing of Hawaii's first formal laws and created a governmental structure. He replaced indigenous traditions with Anglo-American common law. The action was prompted from increasing threat of colonizing forces who were intrigued by the location of the islands. Kamehameha III was advised by William Richards, a former missionary. Richards travelled to the United States in an attempt to learn more about its politics and government structure. He taught Kamehameha III his findings and together they created the first constitution of Hawaii in 1840. Kamehameha III enacted laws that recognized human rights and established a new system for land ownership called Mahele. Another major decision was to move the capital from Lahaina to Honolulu.

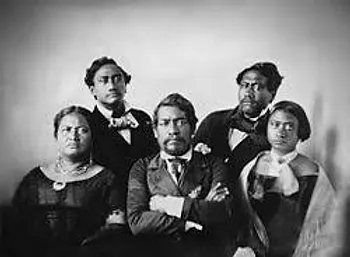
King Kamehameha III and Queen Kalama with their nephews, Prince Alexander Liholiho, Prince Lot Kapuaiwa and niece Princess Victoria Kamamalu

In 1843, for a five-month period, British captain Lord George Paulet tried to colonize the islands. Kamehameha III wrote a letter to the British government informing them of Paulet's actions. After American naval intervention, Great Britain reestablished the islands' independence on July 31, 1843, and Kamehameha III uttered what would become the Hawaiian motto, "Ua Mau ke Ea o ka ʻĀina i ka Pono," meaning, "The life of the land is perpetuated in righteousness." The day became a national holiday known as Lā Hoʻihoʻi Ea.

Kamehameha III married Queen Kalama on February 14, 1837. Kamehameha had one son with his mistress Jane Lahilahi who survived to adulthood, Albert Edward Kūnuiakea. He had two boys with Queen Kalama who died young: Prince Keaweaweʻulaokalani I and Prince Keaweaweʻulaokalani II. Alexander Liholiho, Kamehameha III's nephew, was taken in by the King and pronounced as heir to the throne. In 1854 he became king as a result of the sudden death of Kamehameha III, likely by stroke.

==== Kamehameha IV ====
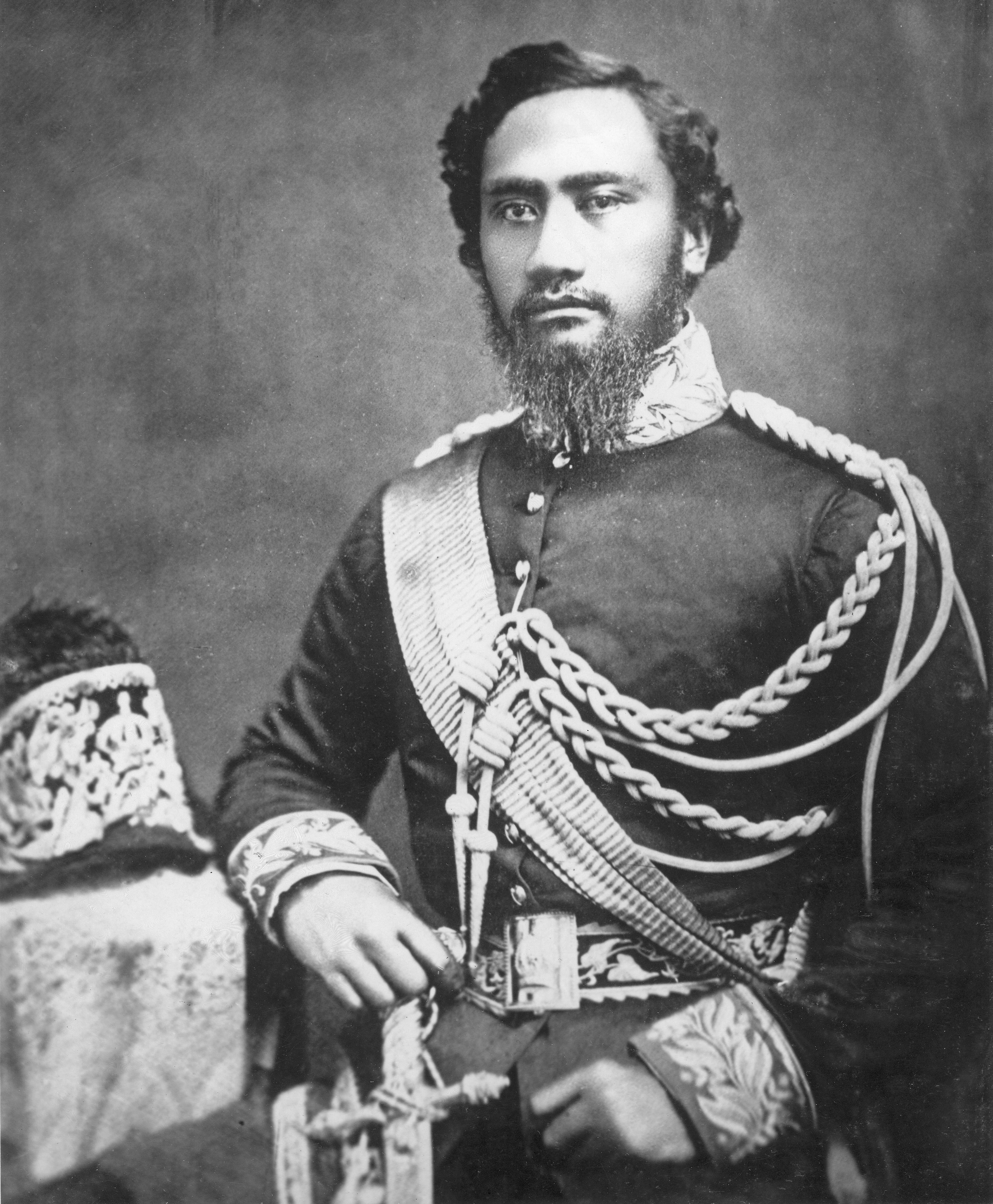
Picture of Kamehameha IV

Alexander Liholiho was born on February 9, 1834, in the capital of the country, Honolulu. 21 years later he took the throne and the name Kamehameha IV. He studied at the Chiefs' Children's School and learned French from Protestant missionaries. The princes did not have a happy experience at the school and were often sent to bed hungry. Liholiho left the school when he was 14 and began studying law. In his late teens, Liholiho began traveling with his brother, Lot Kapuāiwa, in an attempt to establish Hawaii's presence as an independent nation. They travelled to nations such as the United States, France, and Panama. After an 1849 French attack by Admiral de Tromelin, Liholiho was tasked with trying to improve relations with France. Liholiho and Kapuaiwa were accompanied by Gerrit P. Judd to France with hopes of a treaty. After three months they ultimately failed and returned to the islands. Following his return he was appointed to Kamehameha III's privy council in 1852.

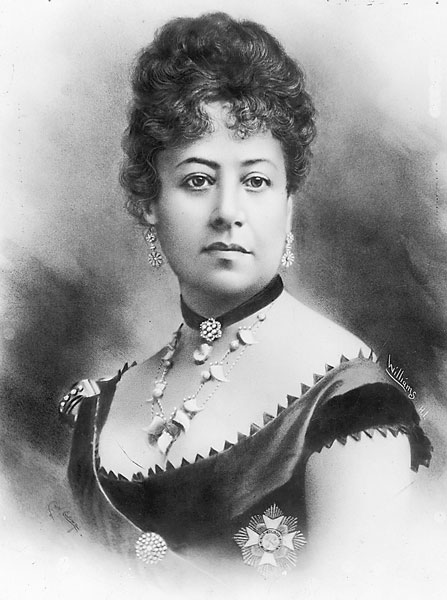
Portrait of Queen Emma Rooke

After taking the throne in 1855, Kamehameha IV's main goal was to limit Anglo-American influence. He ended negotiations over the American annexation of Hawaii. that had been started by Kamehameha III. In 1856 Kamehameha IV had an Anglican wedding with Emma Rooke. Emma Rooke was the great-grandniece of King Kamehameha I and was an aliʻi. Queen Emma was very pro-British due to her British adoptive parents. In 1858 the Queen and King had their only child, Prince Albert Edward Kauikeaouli Kaleiopapa a Kamehameha. The prince died in 1862, but was described as kind and cheerful. Kamehameha IV established the Anglican church in Hawaii. The cause of death for the prince is believed to have been appendicitis. Kamehameha IV blamed himself for the death. As a result, the Queen and the King prioritized healthcare, because diseases like leprosy and influenza were destroying the Hawaiian people. The king's plan was struck down because a healthcare plan had been part of the Constitution of 1852.

The King's rule came to an end on November 30, 1863, when he died from chronic asthma. The King had been experiencing deteriorating health for several months before dying. Kamehameha IV was succeeded by his brother Lot who became Kamehameha V. Queen Emma remained involved in politics until she ultimately lost the race to become the Kingdom's ruling monarch to David Kalakaua.

=== Royal election ===
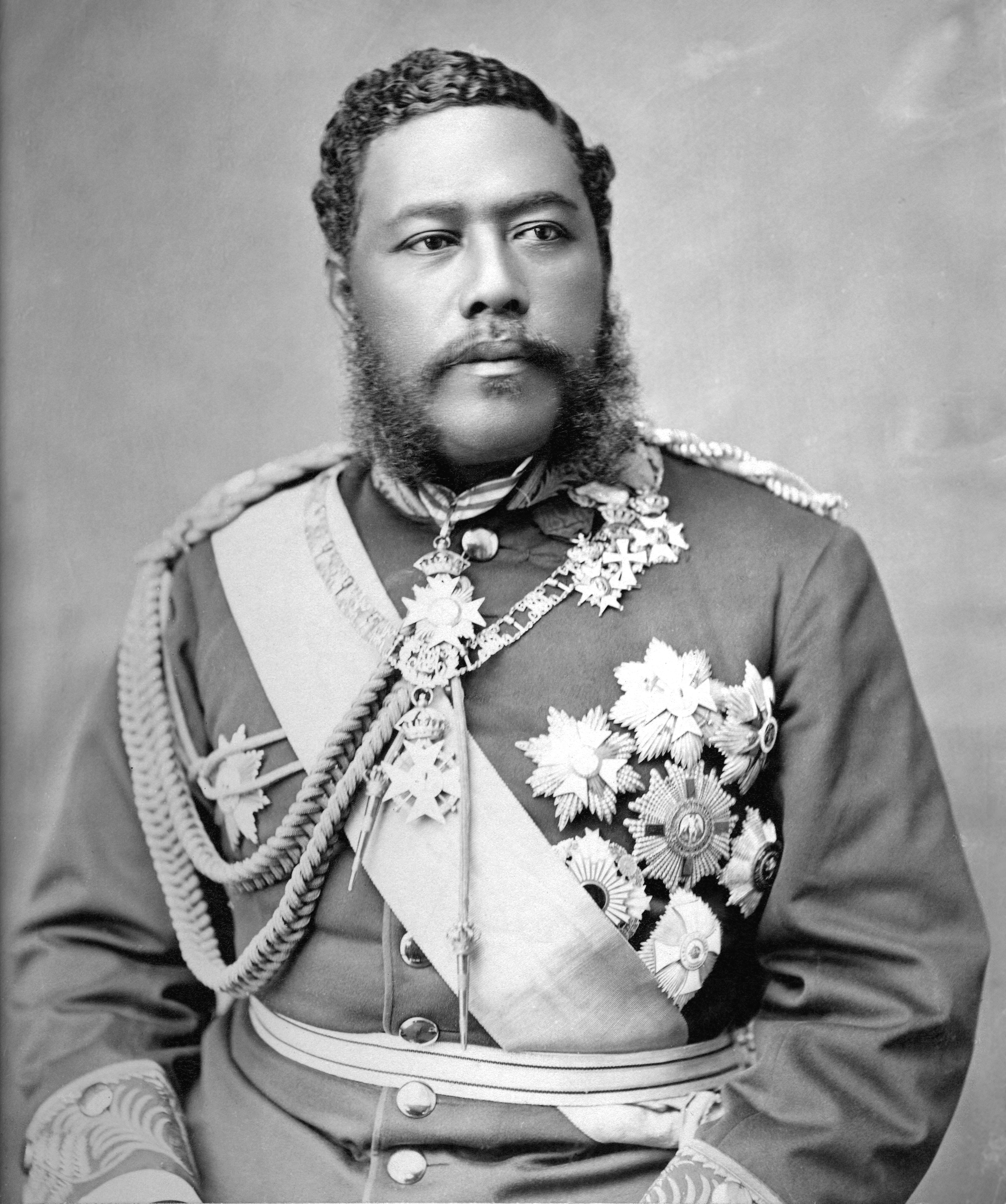
King David Kalākaua

The legislature decided to hold a public referendum and to choose who the public voted for. Queen Emma and David Kalākaua both declared their candidacy. Kalākaua won the 1874 election. While the legislature was formally voting to certify Kalākaua as King, Queen Emma's supporters descended on the capitol and attacked the legislators. 13 legislators supporting Kalākaua were injured, including one who died after he was tossed from a window. The monarchy had no army and the police deserted, leading the government to request the support of American troops to quell the riot.

The new ruler was pressured by the U.S. government to surrender Pearl Harbor to the Navy. Kalākaua was concerned that this would lead to annexation by the U.S. and to violating the traditions of the Hawaiian people, who believed that the ʻĀina was fertile, sacred and not for sale.

=== Whaling ===
In 1816, the population of Honolulu was around 3,000, almost all Hawaiians, although 16 Americans lived on Oahu, all before whaling. As whaling grew, the population grew with it, reaching 23,000 in 1890. One ship arrived in Honolulu in 1820, 62 visited in 1822, 98 in 1829, and 110 in 1833. In Lahaina, 17 whaleships anchored in 1824, 62 in 1830 and 80 in 1832. The crews typically numbered around 30 men. They visited once or twice/year, to restock supplies. US whaling peaked in the 1850s, and was mostly over by the end of the Hawaiian Kingdom.

=== Sugar reciprocity ===
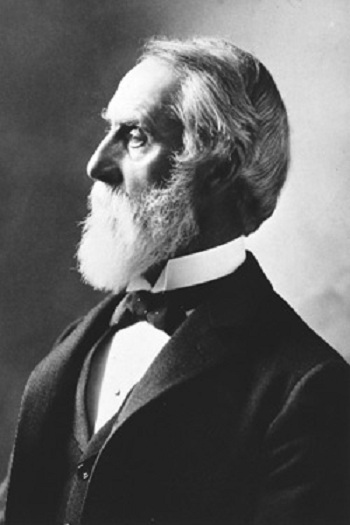
Charles Reed Bishop, Minister of Foreign Affairs (Hawaii)

The first permanent sugar plantation began in Kauai in 1835. William Hooper leased 980 acres of land from Kamehameha III. Within thirty years plantations operated on all four main islands. Sugar upended Hawaii's economy.

American influence in Hawaiian government began when U.S. plantation owners demanded a say in Kingdom politics. Pressure from these plantation owners was felt by the King and chiefs as demands for land tenure. Kamehameha III responded to the demands with the Mahele, distributing land to all Hawaiians as advocated by missionaries including Gerrit P. Judd.

During the 1850s, the U.S. import tariff on sugar from Hawaii was much higher than the tariffs Hawaiians were charging the U.S. Kamehameha III sought reciprocity. The monarch wished to lower U.S. tariffs and make Hawaiian sugar competitive with other foreign suppliers. In 1854 Kamehameha III's proposal of reciprocity between the countries died in the U.S. Senate.

U.S. control of Hawaii was considered vital for the defense of its west coast. The military was especially interested in Puʻuloa, Pearl Harbor. The sale of one harbor was proposed by Charles Reed Bishop, a foreigner who had married into the Kamehameha family, had risen to be Hawaiian Minister of Foreign Affairs and owned a country home near Puʻuloa. He showed two U.S. officers around the lochs, although his wife, Bernice Pauahi Bishop, privately disapproved of selling Hawaiian lands. As monarch, Kamehameha, was content to let Bishop run most business affairs, but the ceding of lands was unpopular with Hawaiians. Many islanders thought that all the islands, rather than just Pearl Harbor, might be lost and opposed any cession. By November 1873, Lunalilo canceled negotiations, but he died on February 3, 1874.

From 1874 through 1875, Kalākaua made a state visit to Washington DC to gather support for a new treaty. Congress agreed to the Reciprocity Treaty of 1875 for seven years in exchange for Ford Island (Pearl Harbor). After the treaty, sugar production expanded from 12,000 acres to 125,000 acres in 1891. At the end of the seven-year term, the treaty lapsed given little interest in the United States.

=== Rebellion of 1887 and the Bayonet Constitution ===
On January 20, 1887, the United States began leasing Pearl Harbor. Shortly afterwards, a group of mostly non-Hawaiians calling themselves the Hawaiian Patriotic League began the Rebellion of 1887. They drafted a constitution, written by Lorrin Thurston, the Hawaiian Minister of the Interior who used the Hawaiian militia to threaten Kalākaua. Kalākaua was forced to dismiss his cabinet ministers and sign the constitution, lessening his power. It became known as the Bayonet Constitution due to the threat of force.

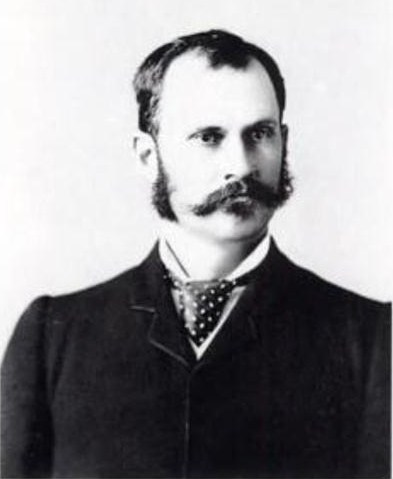
Lorrin Thurston, Minister of the Interior (Hawaii)

Grover Cleveland was president at the time, and his secretary of state Thomas F. Bayard instructed American minister George W. Merrill that in the event of another revolution in Hawaii, the priority was to protect American commerce, lives and property. Bayard specified, "the assistance of the officers of our Government vessels, if found necessary, will therefore be promptly afforded to promote the reign of law and respect for orderly government in Hawaii." In July 1889, a small scale rebellion ensued, and Minister Merrill landed Marines to protect Americans; the State Department explicitly approved this action. Merrill's replacement, minister John L. Stevens, followed those instructions in his controversial actions of 1893.

Although Kalākaua's signature alone had no legal power, the constitution allowed him to appoint cabinet ministers, but stripped him of the power to dismiss them without approval from the Legislature. Eligibility to vote for the House of Nobles was altered, requiring that both candidates and voters own property valued three thousand dollars or more, or have an annual income of six hundred dollars or more. This disenfranchised two thirds of native Hawaiians and other ethnic groups who had previously been eligible to vote. This constitution benefited the foreign plantation owners. With the legislature now responsible for naturalizing aliens, Americans and Europeans could retain their home country citizenship and vote as citizens of the kingdom. Along with voting privileges, Americans could hold office and retain their US citizenship, something not afforded in any other nation and even allowed Americans to vote without becoming naturalized. Asian immigrants were no longer able to acquire citizenship or vote.

=== Wilcox Rebellion of 1888 ===
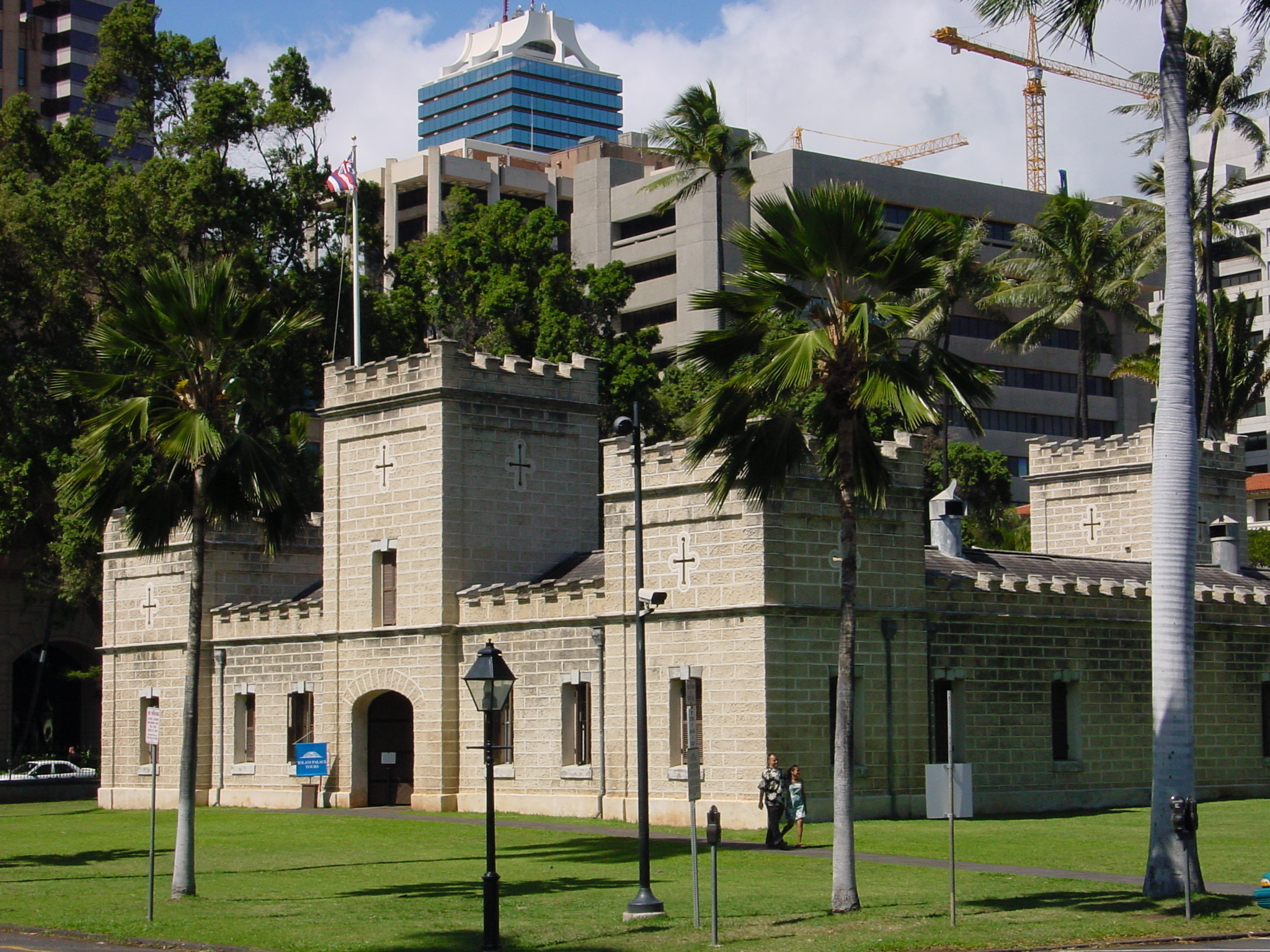
ʻIolani Barracks, 2007

The Wilcox Rebellion of 1888 was a plot to overthrow King David Kalākaua and replace him with his sister in a coup d'état. This was in response to increased political tension between the legislature and the king.

Kalākaua's distant cousin, a native Hawaiian officer and veteran of the Italian military, Robert William Wilcox returned to Hawaii in October 1887 when the funding for his study program stopped. Wilcox, Charles B. Wilson, Princess Liliʻuokalani, and Sam Nowlein plotted to overthrow Kalākaua and replace him with Liliʻuokalani. 300 Hawaiian conspirators hid in Iolani Barracks and an alliance was formed with the Royal Guard, but the plot was accidentally discovered in January 1888, less than 48 hours before the revolt. No one was prosecuted, but Wilcox was exiled. On February 11, 1888, Wilcox left Hawaii for San Francisco, intending to return to Italy with his wife.

Princess Liliʻuokalani was offered the throne several times by the Missionary Party who had forced the Bayonet Constitution on her brother, but she rejected the offers. In January 1891, Kalākaua traveled to San Francisco for his health, staying at the Palace Hotel. He died there on January 20. Liliʻuokalani then ascended the throne. She called her brother's reign "a golden age materially for Hawaii".

=== Liliʻuokalani's attempt to re-write Constitution ===
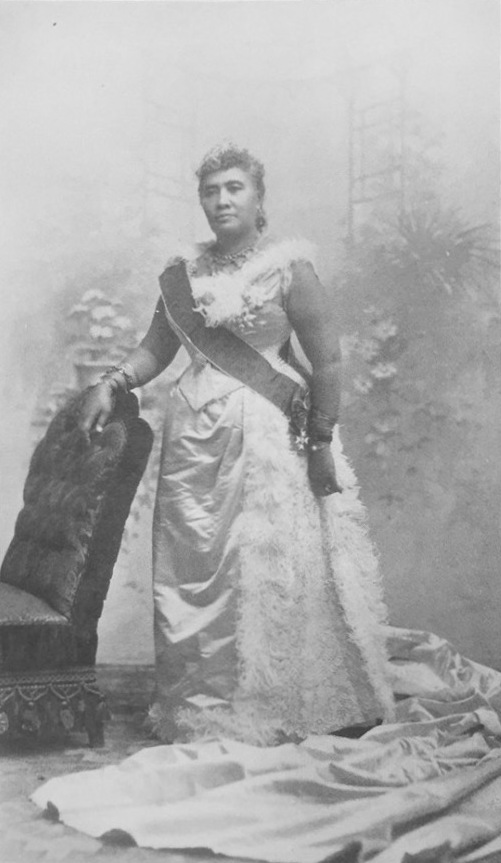
Queen Liliʻuokalani

Liliʻuokalani assumed the throne in the middle of an economic crisis. The McKinley Act had crippled the Hawaiian sugar industry by removing the duties on sugar imports from other countries into the US, eliminating Hawaii's advantage. Many Hawaii businesses and citizens lost revenue; in response Liliʻuokalani proposed a lottery and opium licensing. Her ministers and closest friends were all opposed to this plan; they unsuccessfully tried to dissuade her from pursuing these initiatives, both of which came to be used against her in the brewing constitutional crisis.

Liliʻuokalani's chief desire was to restore power to the monarch by abrogating the 1887 Bayonet Constitution and promulgating a new one. The 1893 Constitution would have extended suffrage by reducing some property requirements. It would have disenfranchised many non-citizen Europeans and Americans. The Queen toured several islands on horseback, talking to the people about her ideas and receiving strong support, including a lengthy petition. However, when the Queen informed her cabinet of her plans, they withheld their support, because of what they expected to be her opponent's likely response.

Liliʻuokalani's attempt to promulgate a new constitution on January 14, 1893, precipitated the overthrow of the Kingdom of Hawaii three days later. The conspirators' stated goals were to depose the queen, overthrow the monarchy, and seek US annexation.

=== Overthrow ===
The overthrow was led by Thurston, who was the grandson of American missionaries and derived his support primarily from the American and European business class and other supporters of the Reform Party of the Hawaiian Kingdom. Most of the leaders of the 13-member Committee of Safety that deposed the queen were American and European citizens who were Kingdom subjects. They included legislators, government officers, and a Supreme Court Justice.

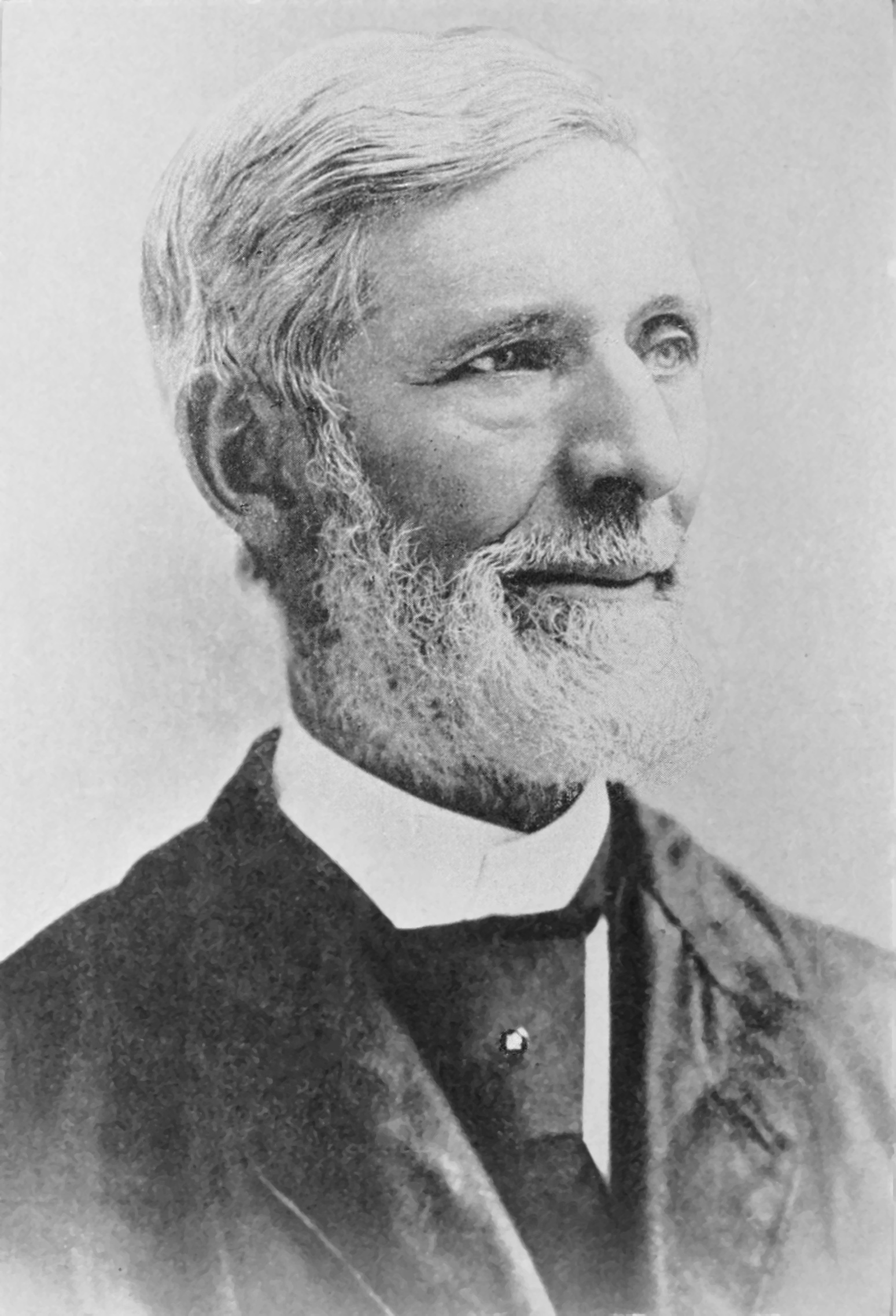
John L. Stevens, an American diplomat, conspired to overthrow the Kingdom of Hawaii

On January 16, the Marshal of the Kingdom, Charles B. Wilson was tipped off by detectives of the planned coup. Wilson requested warrants to arrest the 13 Council members and put the Kingdom under martial law. Because the members had strong political ties with U.S. Government Minister John L. Stevens, the requests were repeatedly denied by Attorney General Arthur P. Peterson and the Queen's cabinet. They feared that the arrests would escalate the situation. After a failed negotiation with Thurston, Wilson began to collect his troops. Wilson and Captain of the Royal Household Guard Samuel Nowlein rallied a force of 496 troops to protect the Queen.

The overthrow began on January 17, 1893. A policeman was shot and wounded while trying to stop a wagon carrying weapons to the Honolulu Rifles, the Committee's paramilitary wing. The Committee feared the shooting would bring government forces and stop the coup before it could begin. The Committee of Safety initiated the overthrow by organizing the Honolulu Rifles made of about 1,500 armed non-native men. The Rifles garrisoned Aliʻiolani Hale across the street from ʻIolani Palace and waited for the Queen's response.

==== United States military support ====
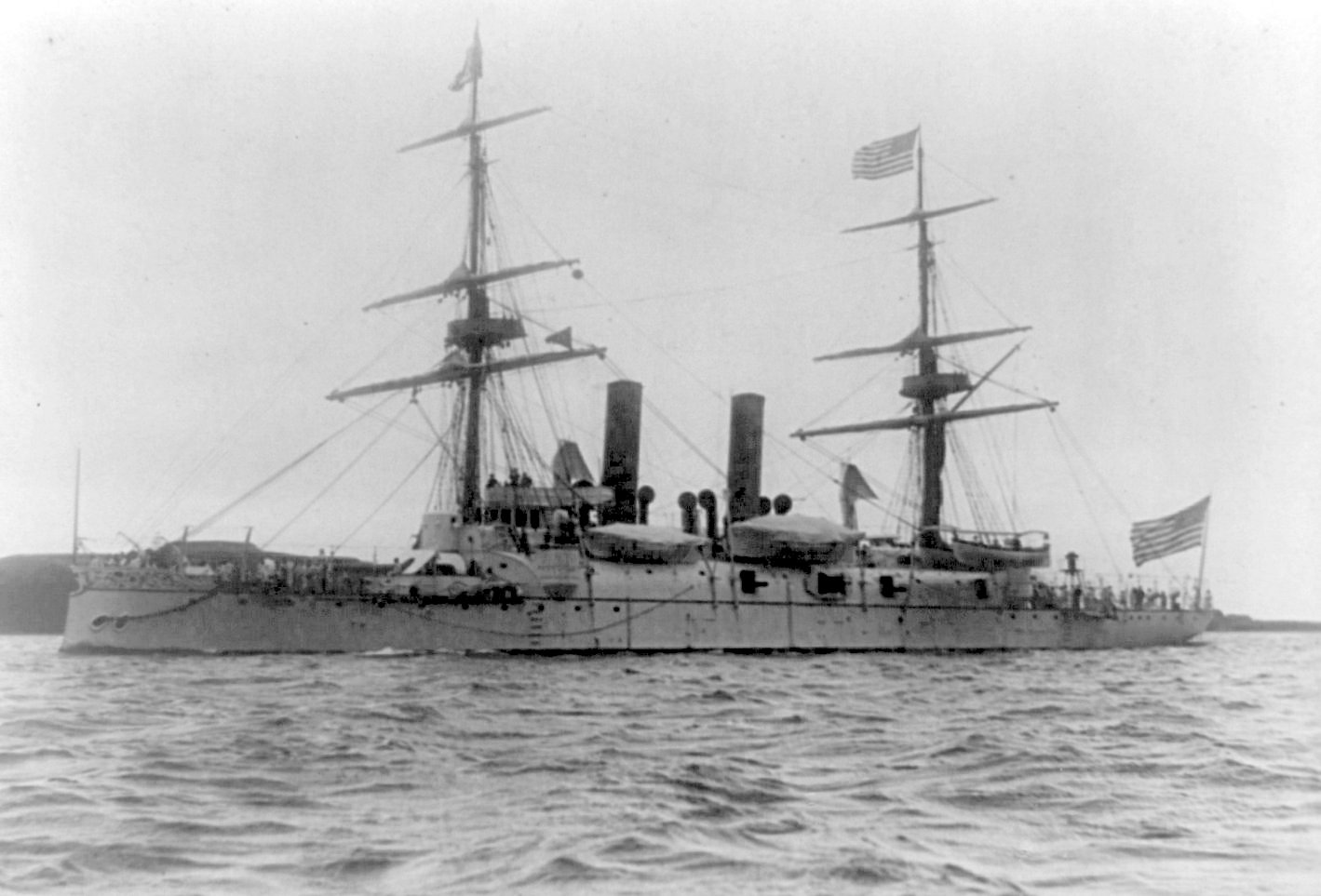
USS Boston, from which 162 U.S. Marines and sailors came ashore providing armed intimidation during the overthrow of Queen Liliʻuokalani

The coup efforts were supported by Stevens. The coup placed the queen under house arrest at Iolani Palace. Advised about supposed threats to non-combatant American lives and property by the Committee, Stevens summoned a company of U.S. Marines from the USS Boston and two companies of U.S. sailors to take up positions at the U.S. Legation, Consulate, and Arion Hall on January 16. 162 armed sailors and Marines aboard the USS Boston in Honolulu Harbor came ashore under orders of neutrality. The sailors and Marines did not participate, but their presence intimidated royalist defenders. Historian William Russ states, "the injunction to prevent fighting of any kind made it impossible for the monarchy to protect itself."

== Territory of Hawaii ==
=== Annexation and colonialization ===
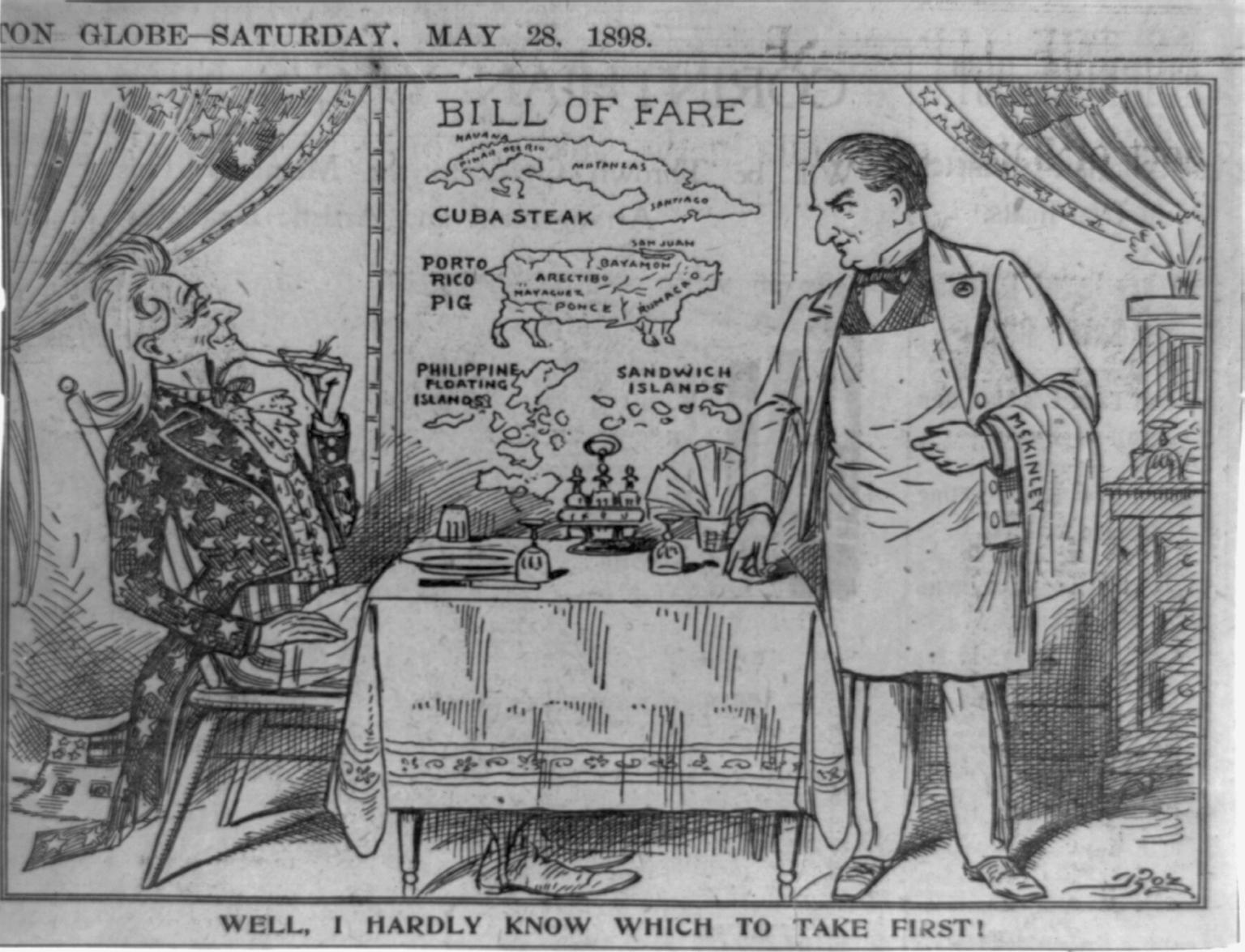
A political cartoon used as propaganda, published in a newspaper on May 28, 1898.

In March 1897, William McKinley, a Republican expansionist, succeeded Democrat Grover Cleveland as U.S. president. He prepared a treaty of annexation but it lacked the needed 2/3 majority in the Senate given Democratic opposition. A joint resolution, written by Democratic Congressman Francis G. Newlands to annex Hawaii passed both the House and Senate; it needed only majority support. The U.S. Supreme Court gave tacit recognition to the annexation in De Lima v. Bidwell, 182 U.S. 1, 196 (1901). The Spanish–American War had broken out and many leaders wanted control of Pearl Harbor to help the United States become a Pacific power and protect the West Coast. Kalākaua was concerned over a possible United States seizure and in Kalākaua's 1881 world tour, he met secretly with the Japanese Emperor to discuss bringing Hawaii under Japan's protection. He proposed to unite the two nations with an arranged marriage between his 5-year-old niece Princess Kaʻiulani and 13-year-old Prince Yamashina Sadamaro. Japan rejected his proposal over concerns that this would worsen relations between Japan and the United States. In 1897 Japan sent warships to Hawaii to oppose annexation. This made the decision more urgent, especially since the islands' fourth-largest population was of Japanese heritage. They were largely aligned with Japan.

McKinley signed the Newlands Resolution annexing Hawaii on July 7, 1898, creating the Territory of Hawaii. On February 22, 1900, the Hawaiian Organic Act established a territorial government. Annexation opponents held that this was illegal, claiming the Queen was the only legitimate ruler. McKinley appointed Sanford B. Dole as territorial governor. The territorial legislature convened for the first time on February 20, 1901. Hawaiians formed the Hawaiian Independent Party, under the leadership of Robert Wilcox, Hawaii's first congressional delegate.

==== Plantations ====
Sugarcane plantations in Hawaii expanded during the territorial period. Some companies diversified and dominated related industries such as transportation, banking and real estate. Economic and political power was concentrated in what were known as the "Big Five".

A 1909 strike by Japanese farm workers led to a brief experiment importing Russian laborers, mostly from Siberia. False promises of land grants by a recruiter named A.W. Perelstrous resulted in strikes among the Russian workers. Hardships included a measles outbreak, lack of ability to communicate with Hawaiians, and culture clashes. Most Russians ended up moving to California, New York, or back to Russia (mostly after the 1917 Russian Revolution).

=== World War II ===
==== Attack on Pearl Harbor ====
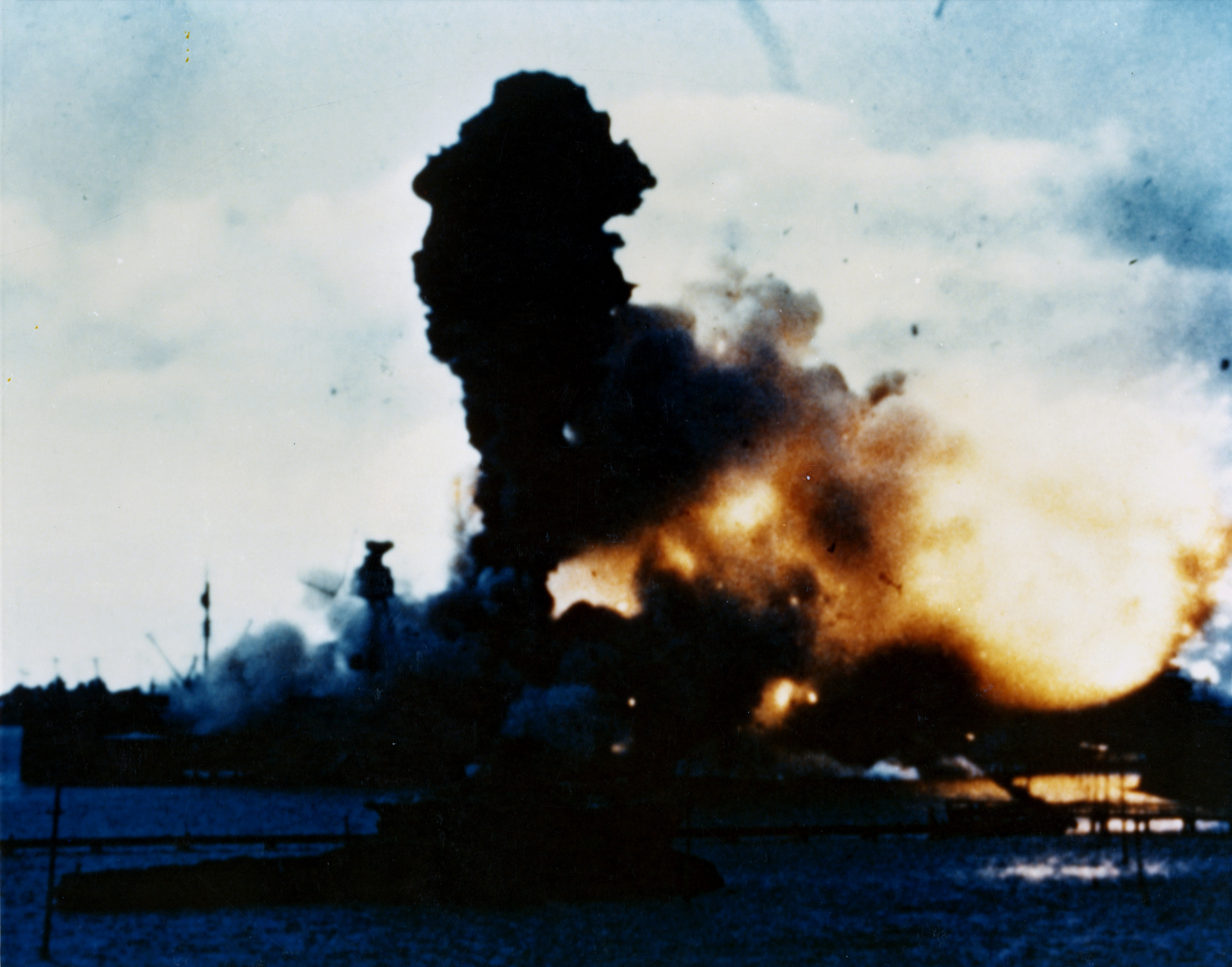
USS Arizona during the attack on Pearl Harbor

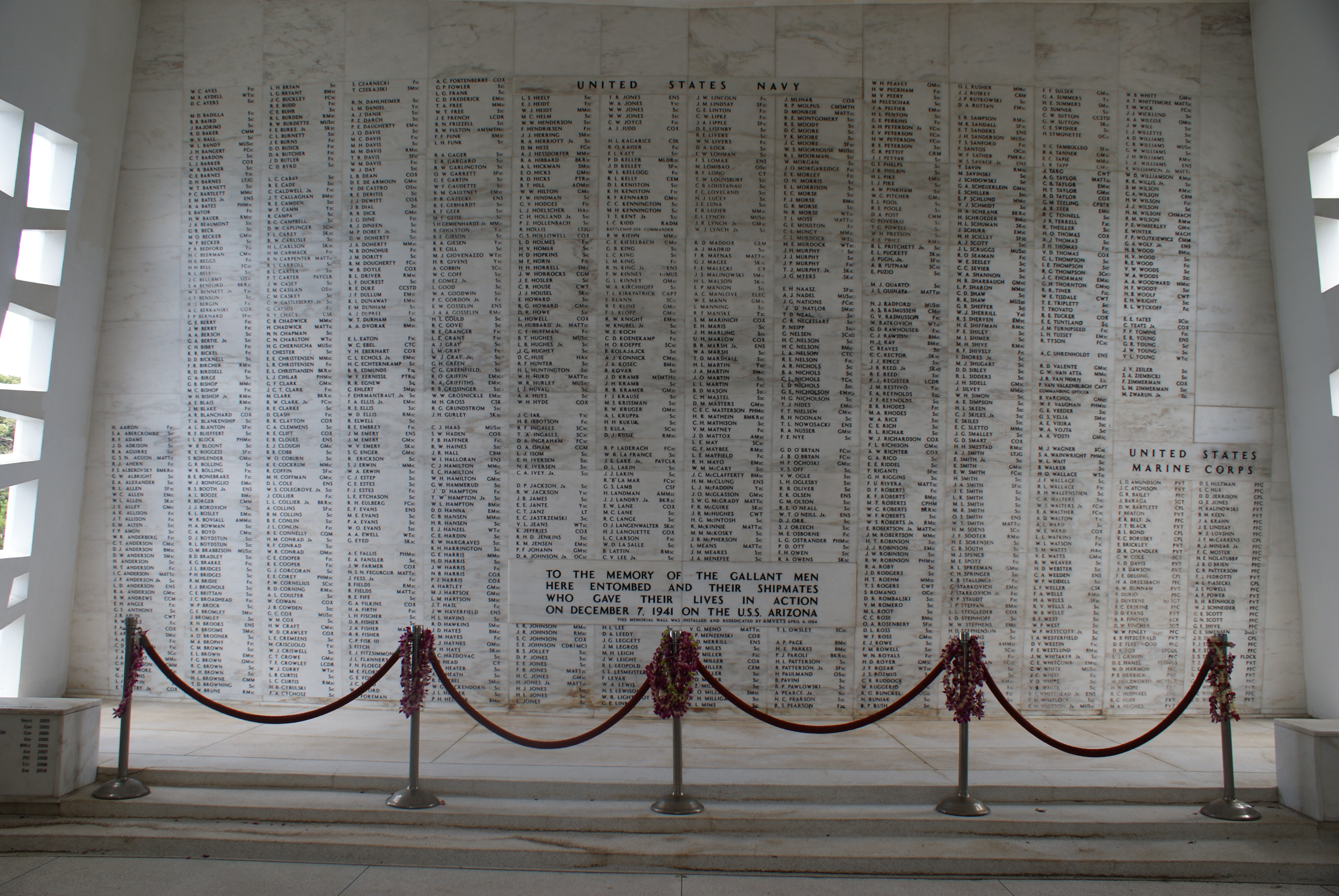
The USS Arizona Memorial

Pearl Harbor was attacked on December 7, 1941, by the Imperial Japanese Navy, killing almost 2,500 people and sinking the main Pacific battleship fleet. Fortuitously for the Americans, the four Pacific aircraft carriers were at sea and escaped damage. Hawaii was put under martial law until 1945.

Unlike the Pacific Coast where 100,000 ethnic Japanese-American citizens were interned, the Japanese-American population in Hawaii avoided internment, although hundreds of pro-Japan leaders were arrested.

Pearl Harbor was the U.S.' main forward base for the Pacific War. The Japanese planned to attack in summer 1942 but were defeated at the Battle of Midway. Hundreds of thousands of American soldiers, sailors, Marines, and airmen passed through the islands. The islands were used for training and bivouac throughout the war.

Hawaii residents formed the 442nd Regimental Combat Team, a U.S. Army infantry regiment. The regiment was composed almost entirely of American soldiers of Japanese ancestry. It fought primarily in Italy, southern France and Germany. The 442nd Regiment was the most decorated unit for its size and length of service in American history. Its 4,000 members had to be reinforced nearly 2.5 times to replace casualties. In total, about 14,000 Hawaiians served in the regiment, earning 9,486 Purple Hearts. The unit was awarded eight Presidential Unit Citations (five in one month). Twenty-one of its members, including Hawaii's former U.S. Senator Daniel Inouye, were awarded Medals of Honor. Its motto was "Go for Broke".

=== Politics ===
Initially, the Hawaii Republican Party dominated territorial politics. However, in 1954 a series of non-violent industry-wide strikes, protests and other civil disobedience transpired. In the territorial elections of 1954 the Democratic Party of Hawaii gained the majority and lobbied for statehood. The labor force unionized, hastening the plantations' decline.

== State of Hawaii ==
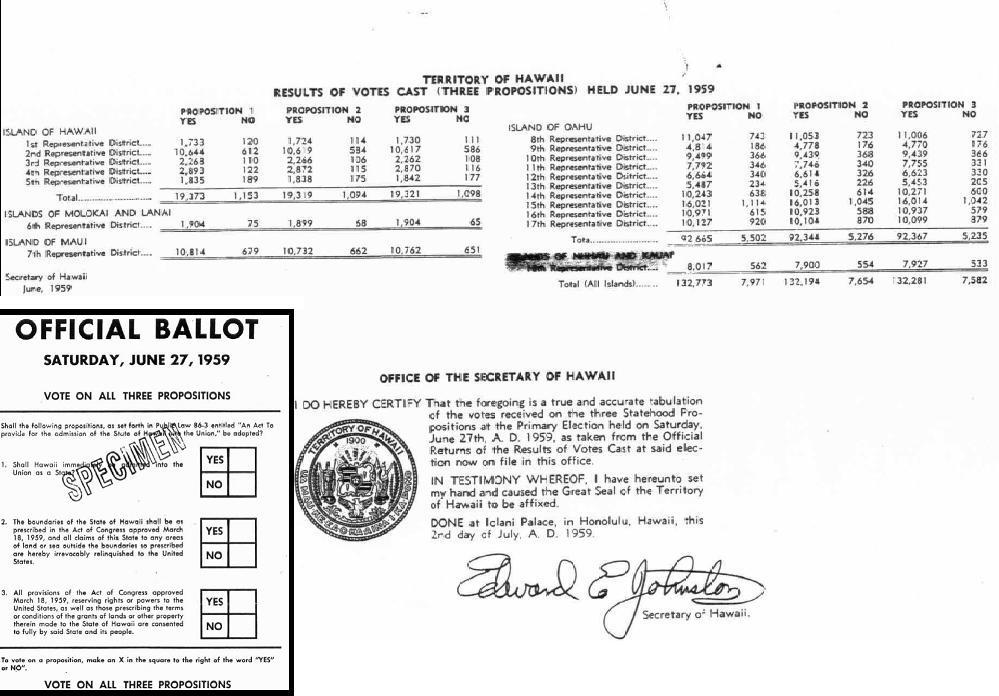
Hawaii residents overwhelmingly voted in favor of statehood in 1959

President Dwight D. Eisenhower signed the Hawaii Admission Act on March 18, 1959, which created the means for Hawaiian statehood. After a referendum in which over 93% of Hawaiian citizens voted in favor of statehood, Hawaii was admitted as the 50th state on August 21, 1959.

=== Annexation legacy ===
From contact through to annexation, the number of Native Hawaiians in Hawaii declined. Bottom was reached in the first census conducted by the United States in 1900 at 37,656. Thereafter the Native Hawaiian population in Hawaii increased with every census.

For many Native Hawaiians, the relationship between the islands and the mainland is problematic, in part because of how Hawaii lost its independence. By contrast the ultimate step of becoming a U.S. State was done properly.

The 1960s Hawaiian Renaissance led to renewed interest in the Hawaiian language, culture and identity.

Congress passed the Apology Resolution (US Public Law 103-150) and it was signed by President Bill Clinton on November 23, 1993. This resolution apologized "to Native Hawaiians on behalf of the people of the United States for the overthrow of the Kingdom of Hawaii on January 17, 1893... and the deprivation of the rights of Native Hawaiians to self-determination." The implications of this resolution have been debated. The resolution's description of Hawaiian history has been criticized, for example, for ignoring the fact that the overthrow of the Hawaiian Kingdom was led by Hawaiian citizens on the Committee of Safety. The resolution also does not explain why it applies only to people descended from persons living in pre-contact Hawaii, as opposed to all subjects of the Kingdom at the time of the overthrow.

In 2000, Senator Daniel Akaka proposed what was called the Akaka Bill to extend federal recognition to those of Native Hawaiian ancestry as a sovereign group similar to Native American tribes. The bill did not pass.

== See also ==
- Monarchs of the Hawaiian Islands
- List of Hawaiian monarchs
- Colonial epidemic disease in Hawaii
- Legal status of Hawaii
- List of conflicts in Hawaii
- List of Missionaries to Hawaii
- National Register of Historic Places listings in Hawaii
- Timeline of Honolulu
- Women's suffrage in Hawaii
