= COVID-19 pandemic in Minnesota =

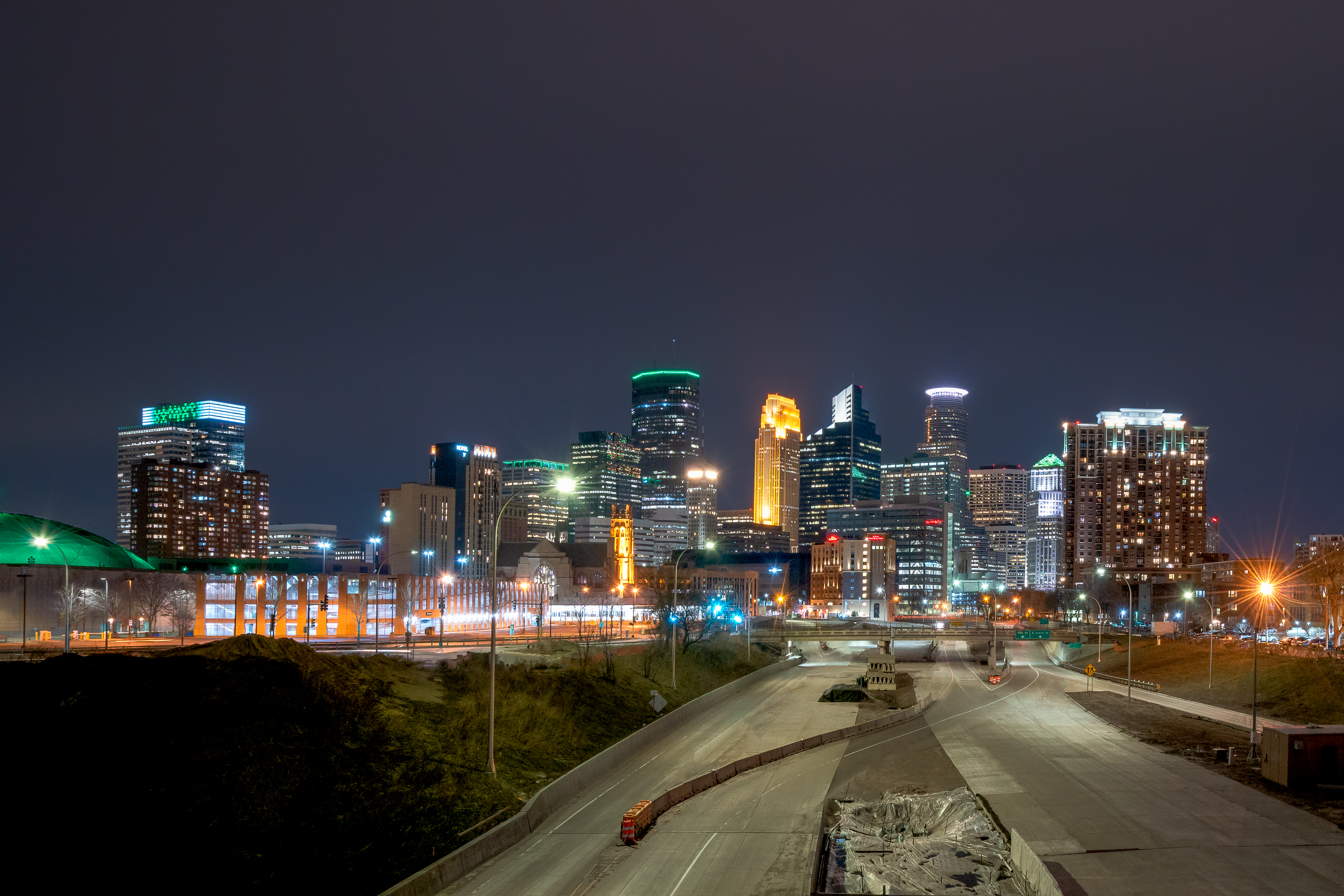
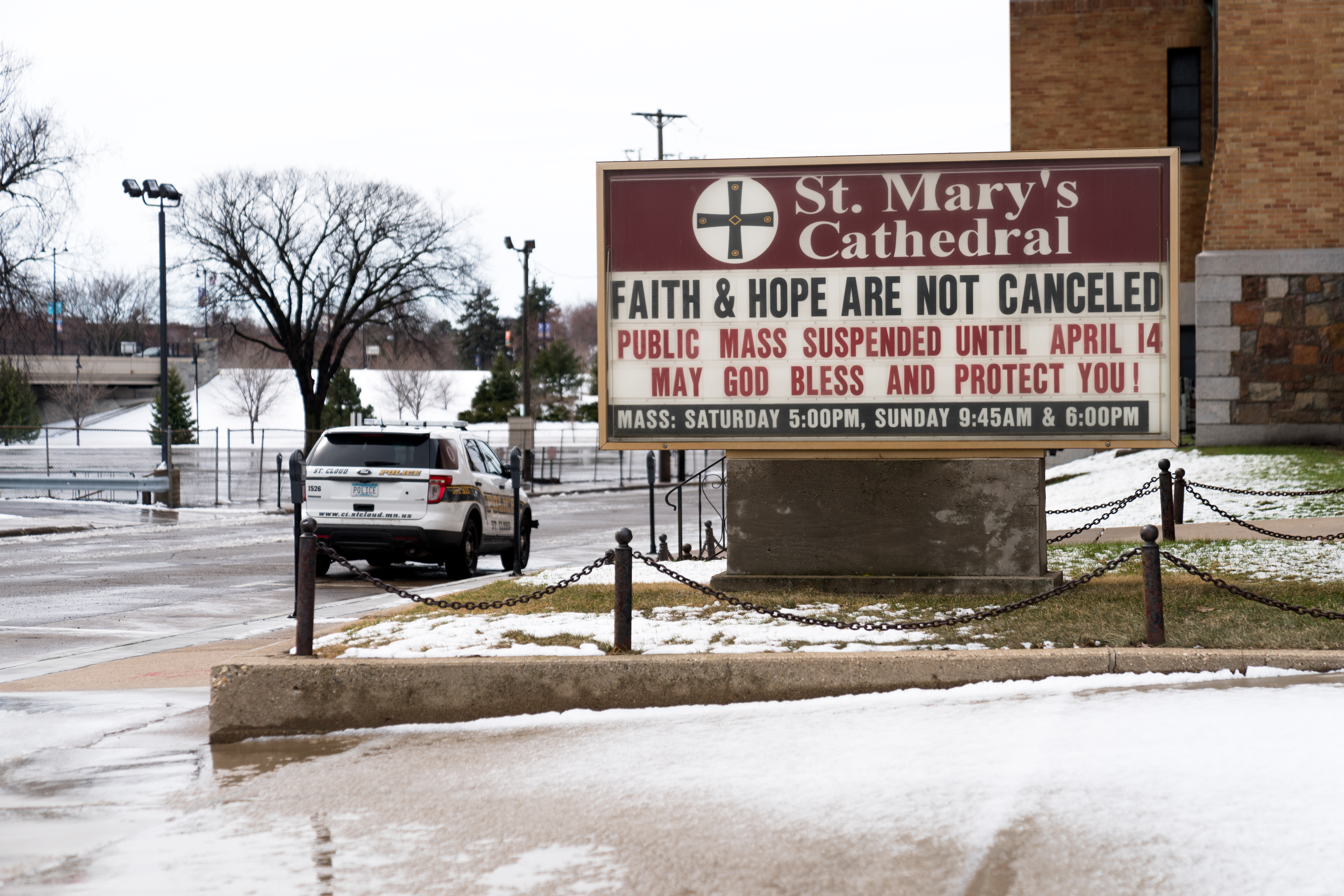
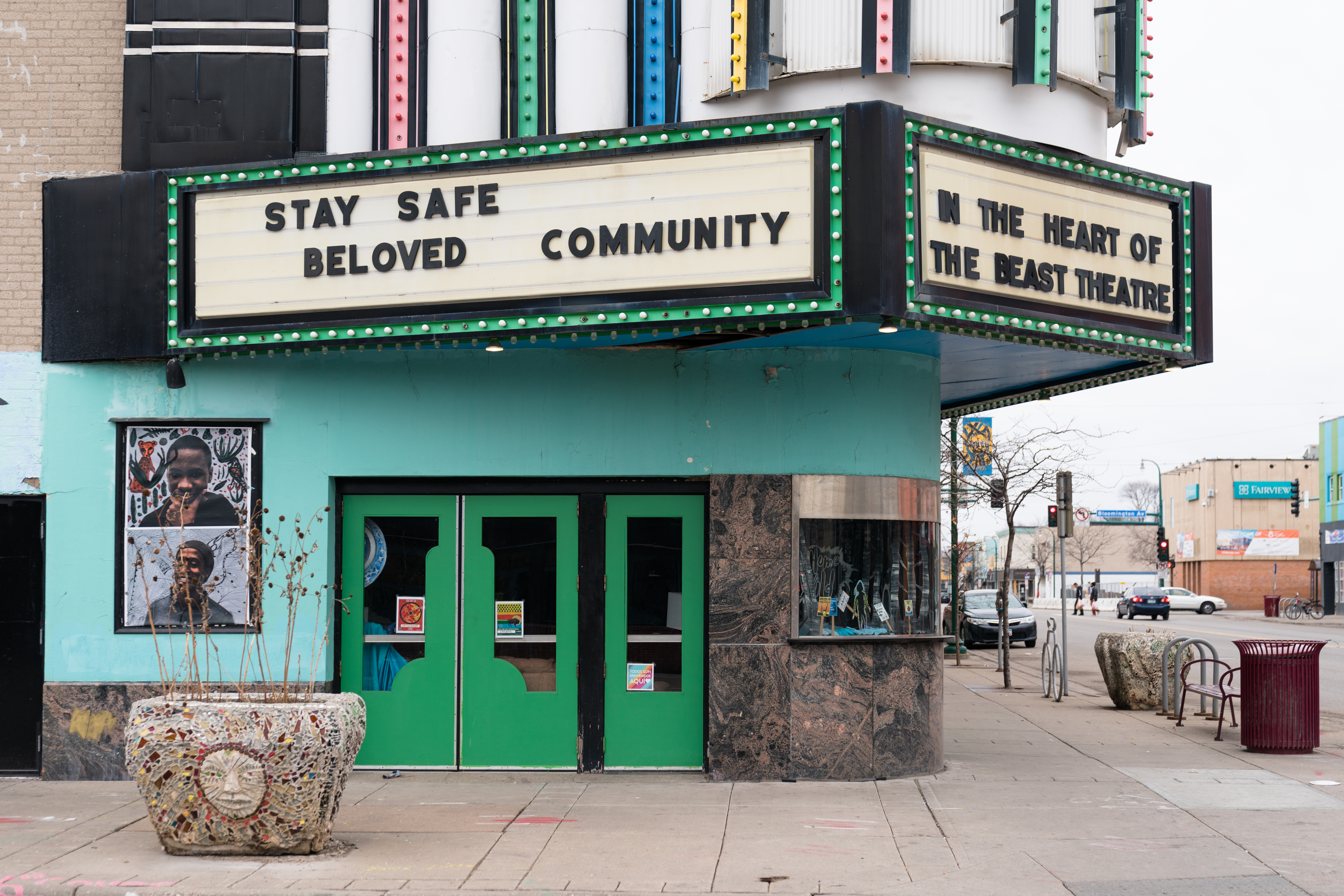
- (clockwise from top): Interstate 35W leading into downtown Minneapolis, devoid of traffic; In The Heart Of The Beast Theatre in Minneapolis; Worker disinfecting the Mary Tyler Moore statue on Nicollet Mall; St. Mary's Cathedral in St. Cloud
- Disease: COVID-19
- Pathogen: SARS-CoV-2
- Location: Minnesota
- First outbreak: Grand Princess
- Index case: St. Paul
- Arrival date: March 6, 2020
- Confirmed cases: 463,132 (February 1) (36,618 health care workers)
- Severe cases: 5,056 (cumulative)
- Hospitalized cases: 24,447 (cumulative)
- Recovered: 448,595
- Deaths: 6,210

Government website
- Minnesota Department of Health

The COVID-19 pandemic in Minnesota is part of an ongoing pandemic of coronavirus disease 2019 (COVID-19) in the state of Minnesota. The first confirmed case was reported on March 6, 2020. Governor Tim Walz declared a state of emergency on March 13.

As of May 28, 2021, Minnesota has administered 5,360,493 COVID-19 vaccine doses, and has fully vaccinated 2,329,984 people, equivalent to 41.88 percent of the population.

On May 6, 2021, Governor Tim Walz announced that COVID-19 restrictions would end on May 28, 2021, and the mask mandate would be lifted July 1, 2021. On Friday May 14, 2021, Tim Walz signed an executive order that lifted the mask mandate.

By January 2026, the Minnesota Department of Health (MDH) reported that cumulative positive cases in the state had surpassed 2,000,000, including reinfections. For the first week of January 2026, the statewide case rate was recorded at approximately 30.7 per 100,000 residents.

== Preparations ==
COVID-19 pandemic medical cases in Minnesota by county
County (Note: County where individuals with a positive case reside. Location of diagnosis and treatment may vary.)	Cases (Note: Reported confirmed and probable cases. Actual case numbers are probably higher. Reinfections are counted as additional cases.) (Note: Includes 893 cases from unknown counties.)	Deaths	Population (Note: July 2019 population estimate from "U.S. Census Bureau Quick Facts: Minnesota". United States Census Bureau.)	Cases / 100k
87 / 87	1,552,840	12,806	5,639,632	27,534.4
Aitkin	3,184	63	15,886	20,042.8
Anoka	105,106	808	356,921	29,448.0
Becker	9,244	96	34,423	26,854.1
Beltrami	12,551	128	47,188	26,597.9
Benton	14,910	177	40,889	36,464.6
Big Stone	1,465	9	4,991	29,352.8
Blue Earth	19,001	105	67,653	28,086.0
Brown	6,832	81	25,008	27,319.3
Carlton	9,771	100	35,871	27,239.3
Carver	28,686	119	105,089	27,296.9
Cass	7,423	84	29,779	24,927.0
Chippewa	3,260	48	11,800	27,627.1
Chisago	15,410	120	56,579	27,236.3
Clay	20,805	127	64,222	32,395.4
Clearwater	2,207	31	8,818	25,028.4
Cook	651	4	5,463	11,916.5
Cottonwood	3,330	41	11,196	29,742.8
Crow Wing	16,901	172	65,055	25,979.6
Dakota	119,858	796	429,021	27,937.6
Dodge	6,095	22	20,934	29,115.3
Douglas	11,579	119	38,141	30,358.4
Faribault	4,001	54	13,653	29,304.9
Fillmore	5,090	24	21,067	24,161.0
Freeborn	9,476	78	30,281	31,293.6
Goodhue	14,138	140	46,340	30,509.3
Grant	1,550	12	5,972	25,954.5
Hennepin	333,729	2,634	1,265,843	26,364.2
Houston	4,850	20	18,600	26,075.3
Hubbard	5,177	60	21,491	24,089.2
Isanti	10,611	119	40,596	26,138.0
Itasca	11,877	149	45,130	26,317.3
Jackson	2,221	17	9,846	22,557.4
Kanabec	3,743	57	16,337	22,911.2
Kandiyohi	14,043	142	43,199	32,507.7
Kittson	1,076	28	4,298	25,034.9
Koochiching	3,036	38	12,229	24,826.2
Lac qui Parle	1,843	29	6,623	27,827.3
Lake	2,277	30	10,641	21,398.4
Lake of the Woods	812	6	3,740	21,711.2
Le Sueur	6,739	51	28,887	23,328.8
Lincoln	1,252	6	5,639	22,202.5
Lyon	7,314	74	25,474	28,711.6
Mahnomen	1,875	18	5,527	33,924.4
Marshall	2,165	24	9,336	23,189.8
Martin	5,864	65	19,683	29,792.2
McLeod	11,278	108	35,893	31,421.2
Meeker	6,223	75	23,222	26,797.9
Mille Lacs	7,586	117	26,277	28,869.4
Morrison	9,594	106	33,386	28,736.6
Mower	12,474	74	40,062	31,136.7
Murray	2,116	19	8,194	25,823.8
Nicollet	8,684	68	34,274	25,337.0
Nobles	7,104	60	21,629	32,844.8
Norman	1,580	14	6,375	24,784.3
Olmsted	46,243	194	158,293	29,213.5
Otter Tail	14,178	172	58,746	24,134.4
Pennington	3,783	41	14,119	26,793.7
Pine	7,509	68	29,579	25,386.3
Pipestone	2,051	34	9,126	22,474.2
Polk	9,247	110	31,364	29,482.8
Pope	3,354	19	11,249	29,816.0
Ramsey	137,147	1,373	550,321	24,921.3
Red Lake	962	13	4,055	23,723.8
Redwood	4,112	54	15,170	27,106.1
Renville	3,918	58	14,548	26,931.5
Rice	18,935	184	66,972	28,273.0
Rock	2,403	35	9,315	25,797.1
Roseau	4,621	45	15,165	30,471.5
Scott	43,055	266	149,013	28,893.5
Sherburne	28,504	183	97,238	29,313.6
Sibley	3,730	25	14,865	25,092.5
St. Louis	51,870	546	199,070	26,056.2
Stearns	53,747	373	161,075	33,367.7
Steele	10,932	63	36,649	29,828.9
Stevens	2,831	14	9,805	28,873.0
Swift	2,382	33	9,266	25,706.9
Todd	7,137	61	24,664	28,936.9
Traverse	893	10	3,259	27,401.0
Wabasha	6,009	19	21,627	27,784.7
Wadena	4,429	58	13,682	32,371.0
Waseca	5,768	39	18,612	30,990.8
Washington	72,826	494	262,440	27,749.6
Watonwan	3,062	24	10,897	28,099.5
Wilkin	1,714	22	6,207	27,614.0
Winona	13,888	74	50,484	27,509.7
Wright	38,356	306	138,377	27,718.5
Yellow Medicine	2,684	30	9,709	27,644.5
Final update June 29, 2022, with data from the previous business day Data is publicly reported by Minnesota Department of Health

The Minnesota Department of Health began testing for the virus on January 20. During this time, no cases were positively tested in Minnesota. State health officials were monitoring for potential cases and making plans to contain future outbreaks.

Mayo Clinic in Rochester began fast-tracking development of a test for the virus in mid-February.

== Timeline ==
=== March 2020 ===
==== March 6 ====
The first positive test was confirmed in the state. The patient had recently taken a Grand Princess cruise on a ship with a known case. The patient was an older adult from Ramsey County and had started having symptoms on February 25 and received medical care on March 5. They returned home to recover in isolation. Governor Tim Walz said "I'm confident that Minnesota is prepared for this."

==== March 8 ====
The second positive test in the state was confirmed in Carver County. A patient in their 50s began having symptoms on March 2 after likely being exposed while traveling in Europe in February. They sought medical care on March 7 and began recovering at home in isolation.

==== March 10 ====
The twenty-third Minnesota patient was hospitalized in critical condition at an Anoka County hospital. The patient is in their 30s and had no obvious underlying conditions. They developed symptoms on February 28 after being in contact with international travelers, which likely exposed them to the virus. They were evaluated on March 3 and released at that time without being tested, which the Minnesota Department of Health had deemed "appropriate". They returned for medical services on March 9. According to health officials, there was no evidence the virus was being transmitted person to person in the state yet.

A bill to set aside $20.8 million for Minnesota's coronavirus outbreak response is signed by Governor Walz. This money is in addition to the $4.6 million already in the account for public health response, totaling over $25 million.

==== March 11 ====
5 total cases in Minnesota have been confirmed. The fourth patient is in their 50s, in Olmsted County, and was diagnosed at the Mayo Clinic in Rochester. The fifth patient is in Ramsey County and in their 30s.

The University of Minnesota announces the suspension of classes across all five campuses. The university will extend its spring break to two weeks, ending March 18, at which time classes will resume through online instruction. Online instruction will continue until at least April 1 including field experience and clinical. During this time, residence halls, dining services, and other student services will continue normal operation.

Mayo Clinic also began "drive-through testing" for the virus, though patients still needed to be approved to be tested by telephone screening.

==== March 12 ====
9 total cases are confirmed in Minnesota with the four new cases all considered to be travel-related. The new cases are reported in Hennepin, Dakota, and Stearns counties. All non-critical cases had begun recovering at home in isolation. At this time, the Minnesota Department of Health did not recommend closing schools.

==== March 13 ====
14 total cases are confirmed in Minnesota; the new cases were reported to be in Hennepin, Ramsey, Anoka, Dakota, Carver, and Wright counties. As of this date, more than 550 people have been tested for the virus in the state.

Governor Walz declares a peacetime state of emergency. He says, "We are going into a heightened state of readiness to protect Minnesotans."

==== March 14 ====
21 total cases confirmed in Minnesota. All 7 new cases were connected to contact with a confirmed case of COVID-19. All seven patients begin recovering at home in self-isolation. 868 total tests have been conducted.

==== March 15 ====
35 total cases confirmed in Minnesota. The new cases involved residents of Hennepin, Ramsey, Dakota, Olmsted, Waseca, and Washington counties. Additionally, the Minnesota Department of Health reports three of the new cases were exposed via community transmission.

Governor Tim Walz announces the temporary closure of all Minnesota K-12 public schools from March 18 until March 27. He says, "My top priority as Governor is the safety of Minnesotans. As a former teacher, and father of two teenage kids, I'm especially focused on the safety of our children." During the school shutdown, meals and mental health services will still be provided to students in need. Under the governor's order, schools will remain open for elementary-aged children of health care workers and other emergency workers. Teachers will be using this time to plan for a possibility of weeks of long-distance learning.

==== March 16 ====
The Minnesota Legislature begins scaling back operations as the State House and Senate will be meeting on an on-call basis. For future meetings, they will be meeting in locations that allow for 6 feet between representatives.

Governor Tim Walz announces in Executive Order 20-04 that all non-essential businesses close until March 27, 2020, citing the first confirmed case of community spread, detected the previous day, as his cause for this action.

==== March 17 ====
The Minnesota Department of Health (MDH) today announces that due to a national shortage of COVID-19 laboratory testing materials, the state is forced to make adjustments to its testing criteria to focus on the highest priority specimens, including hospitalized patients.

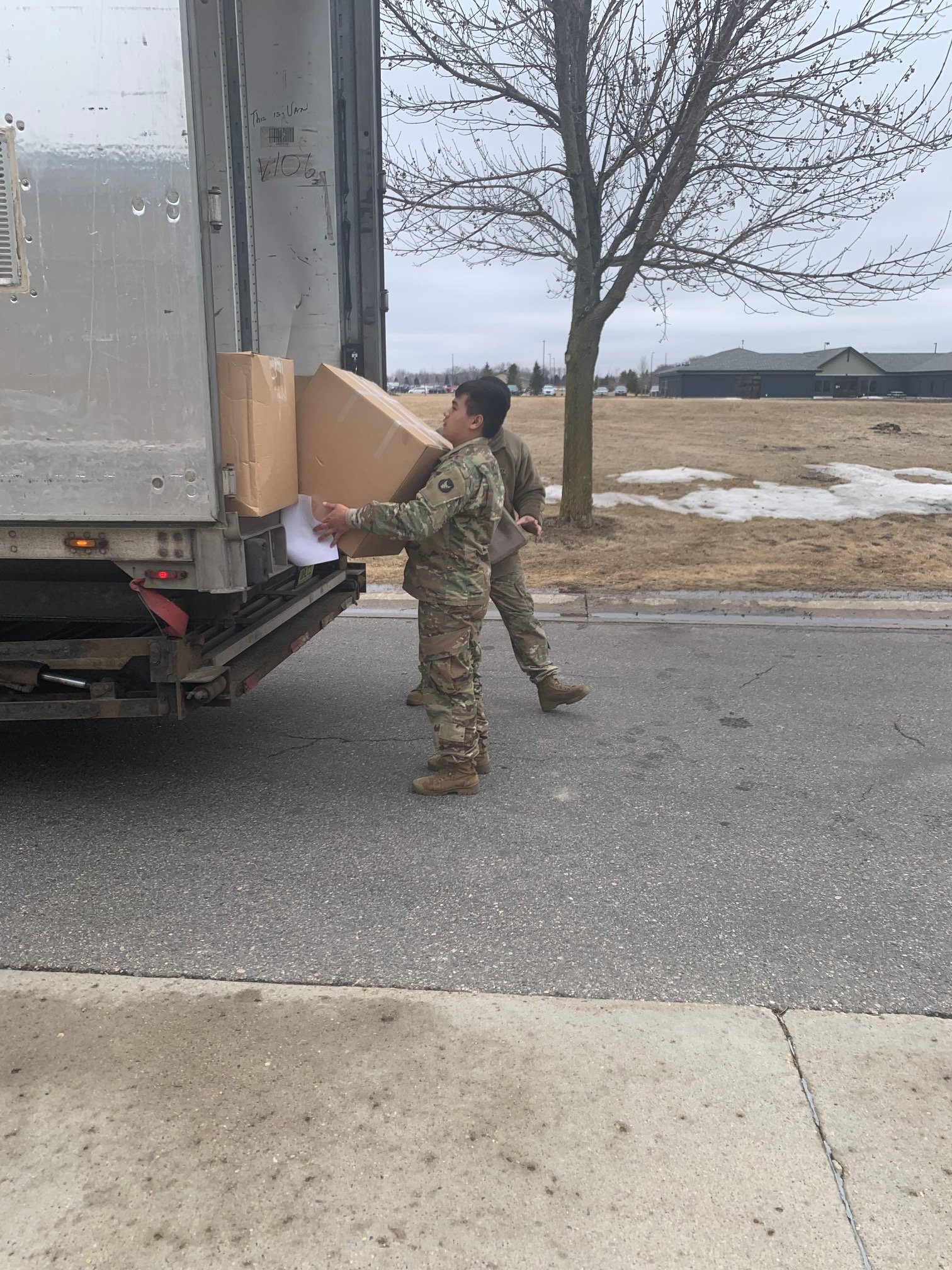
Delivering surgical masks in Minnesota

==== March 21 ====
The state confirms its first death due to the virus; the patient was from Ramsey County and was in their 80s. The patient had contracted the virus from a confirmed case. Lieutenant Governor Peggy Flanagan also confirms her brother died due to the coronavirus in Nashville, TN.

==== March 23 ====
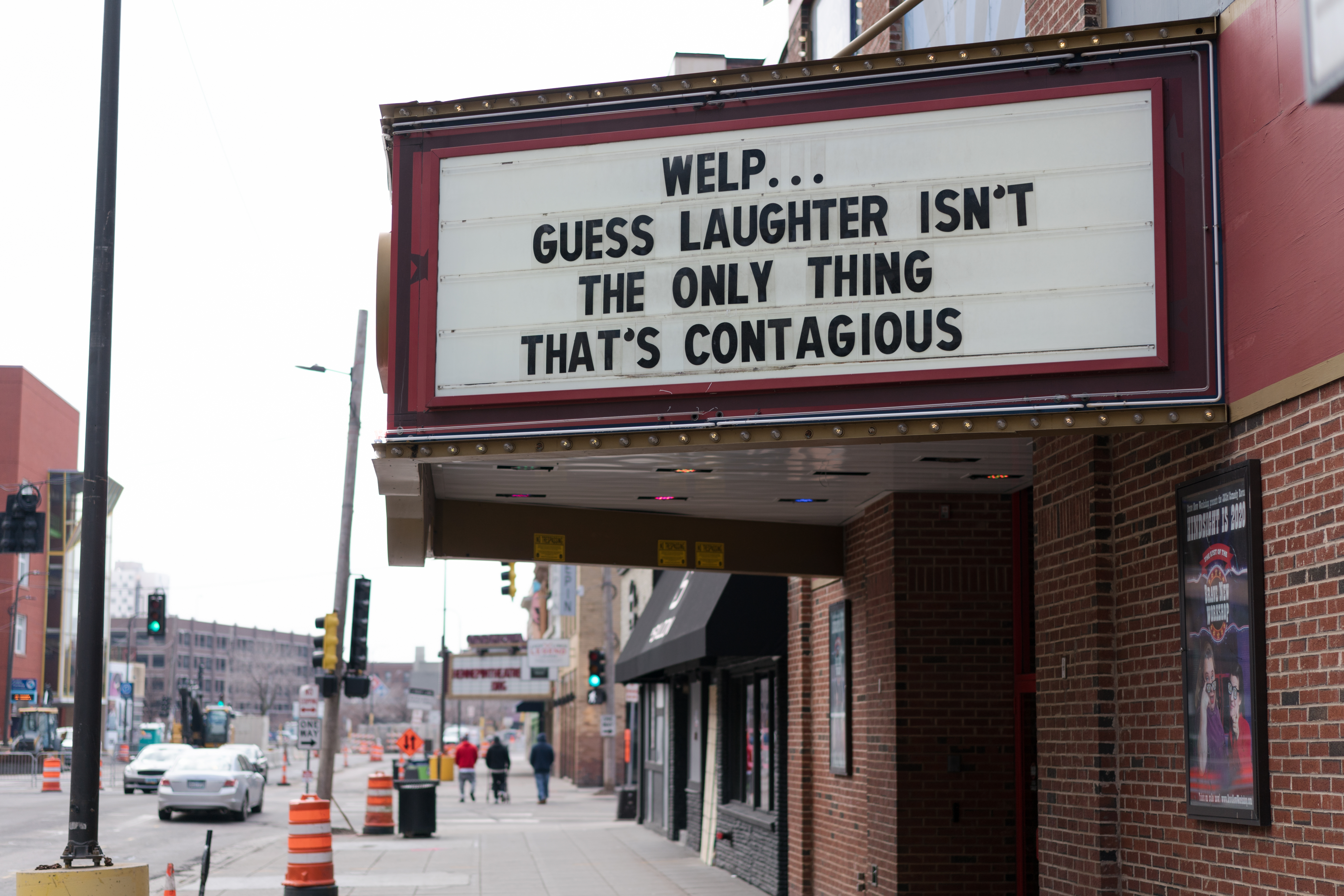
A marquee at Brave New Workshop in downtown Minneapolis referencing coronavirus

The governor makes several announcements regarding the state's response to the virus:

- A small business loan program would be made available for possibly 5000 businesses during the week for amounts between $2,500 and $35,000
- All elective veterinary surgeries would be halted
- The budget for the response to the virus would be revised, asking for an additional $365 million

==== March 25 ====
The state announces a total of 287 confirmed cases of the virus, 26 of which required hospitalization. It is reported that the actual number of cases was likely at least 10 times higher than this number.

Governor Tim Walz signs Executive Order 20-20. This order states that all people currently residing in Minnesota are to shelter in place beginning March 27, 2020 at 11:59PM through April 10, 2020 at 5:00PM. Walz also signs executive orders 20-18 and 20–19. Executive order 20-18 extended the previous statewide closure of all non-essential businesses, which was due to end March 27, 2020, to remain closed until May 1, 2020. Executive Order 20-19 extended school closures and a "Distance Learning Period" was ordered to begin in Minnesota from March 30, 2020, until May 4, 2020.

=== April 2020 ===
==== April 8 ====
Governor Tim Walz extended the Stay at Home (Executive Order 20–33) order until May 3 at 11:59 PM. He cited his reason for doing so due to the new data and new discoveries on about COVID-19 since the original order was put in place. He is also allowing hardware and garden shops to open so long as they follow all the Minnesota Department of Health guidelines.

==== April 17 ====
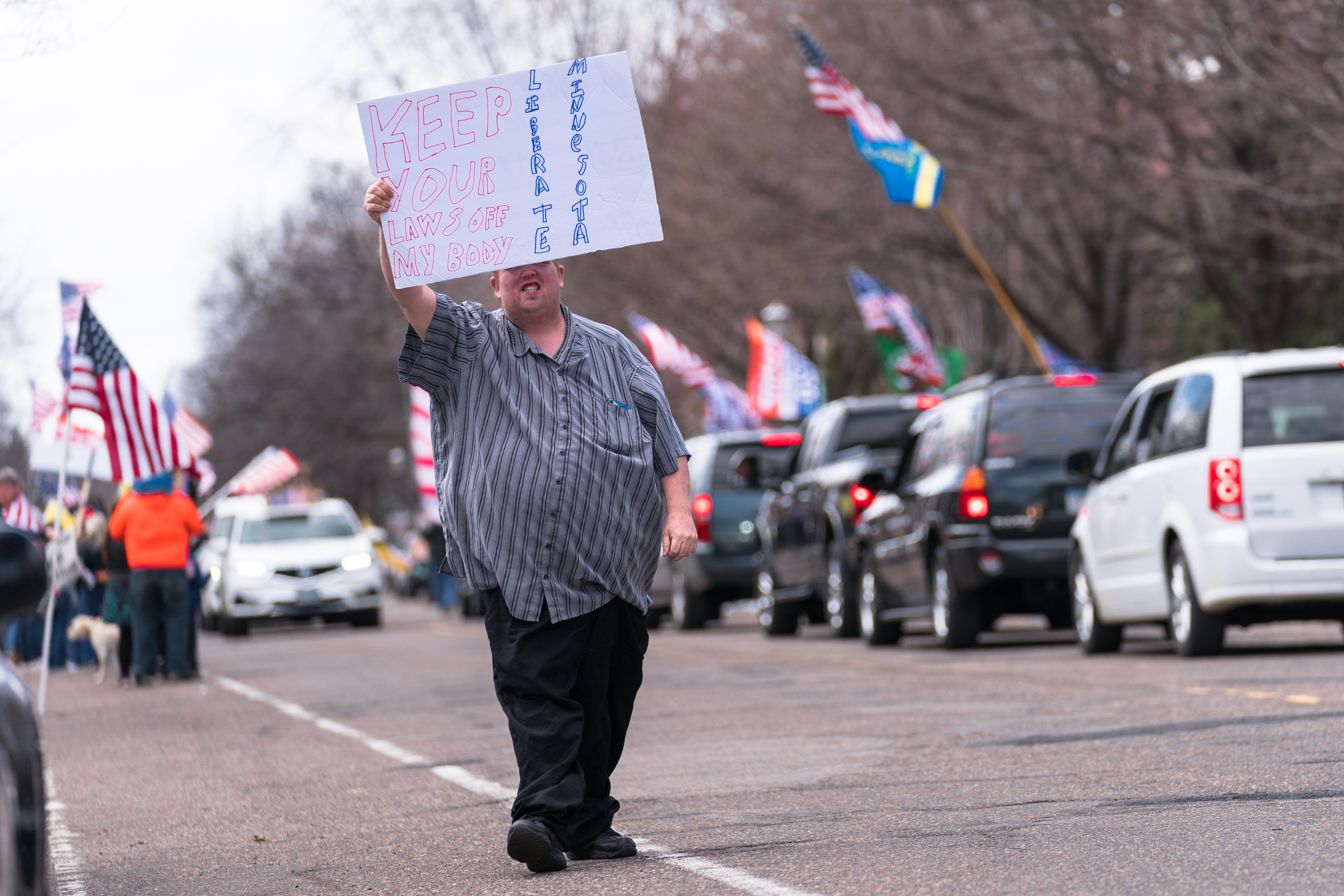
Protestor at the Governor's Residence in St. Paul

During the early hours of the 17th, President Donald Trump tweeted "LIBERATE MINNESOTA" in reference to Governor Tim Walz's stay at home order. Later that afternoon, several hundred citizens protested the order in front of the Governor's Residence in St. Paul. The protest was organized largely via Facebook by the Minnesota Gun Rights Caucus. Ben Dorr, a head member of the advocacy group, has repeatedly called for the state to reopen and has claimed that COVID-19 poses no greater threat to public health than the flu. Dorr has two older brothers who are also gun-rights advocates. The three have used their collective social media presence to call for additional protests.

During his usual daily press conference, Governor Walz announced that it was now permitted for people to engage in various outdoor activities such as hiking, fishing, hunting, and motor-boating so long as they maintained a safe and reasonable distance from other people. As well as allowing people to engage in various outdoor activities, he allowed golf courses and bait shops to open.

==== April 29 ====
MDH Covid data results from April 29, 2020, included a backlog of tests loaded into system. https://www.health.state.mn.us/diseases/coronavirus/situation.html#testingm1

==== April 30 ====
Governor Tim Walz extended the stay at home order for Minnesota to Sunday May 17 at 11:59 PM. He stated that staying home is the most powerful weapon to "defeat" the virus and that "we must run the full marathon and not stop at mile 20". Furthermore, he is requiring certain personnel to wear face masks and strongly urging the general public to do the same.

=== May 2020 ===
The Minnesota State Fair was cancelled in response to the pandemic.

==== May 18 ====
After being previously extended, the stay-at-home order expired and was replaced with a "stay safe Minnesota" order. This occurred at a time when new cases and hospitalizations were both increasing. Referring to the changes as a "measured Minnesota approach", Walz clarified that "we're not flipping a switch and everything's going back to normal at once... we're slowly moving the dial and introducing more interaction between people over time." He also announced that bars, restaurants, gyms, and salons would remain closed.

==== May 21 ====
The current single-day record of new cases was set, with 982 positive tests being reported.

==== May 26 ====
Following the murder of George Floyd on May 25, protesters gathered in large groups for vigils, marches and demonstrations, first in Minneapolis and Saint Paul, and later throughout the state. Most protesters wore masks and people were generally able to limit exposure through social distancing, brief interactions, and by being outdoors. While health experts warned that the protests could lead to an increased risk of a surge in COVID-19 cases, testing indicated that few of the protesters contracted the disease. The use of tear gas and pepper spray by the Minneapolis Police Department and the Minnesota National Guard was criticized for creating conditions where the virus could spread more easily by exacerbating respiratory infections, increasing exposure rates, and compromising immune systems.

=== June 2020 ===
==== June 3 ====
MDH Covid data results from June 3, 2020, included a backlog of tests loaded into system. https://www.health.state.mn.us/diseases/coronavirus/situation.html#testingm1

==== June 12 ====
Gov. Walz extended the emergency order through July 13.

==== June 12 ====
At least 88 of approximately 1,000 workers at an Amazon warehouse in Shakopee tested positive. An additional 99 positive tests had been reported at other Amazon sites in the Twin Cities as of this date.

==== June 12–13 ====
Over 100 cases were reported among people in their 20s who patronized crowded bars in the Mankato area, during the first weekend that indoor service was permitted. A cluster of 30 cases was also reported at two Minneapolis bars.

=== July 2020 ===
Minnesota experienced a significant increase in positive cases beginning in late June and extending into July consistent with the greater nationwide trend. However, in mid-July, the number of new deaths and hospitalizations were still decreasing. It has been observed that this increase was largely driven by the 20-29 age group, and by communities in the Twin Cities suburbs.

==== July 13 ====
Gov. Walz extended the emergency order for 30 more days, through August 12.

==== July 20 ====
The state records its youngest fatality from the virus: A 9 month old baby from Clay County who died with no underlying health conditions.

=== August 2020 ===
==== August 12 ====
A Seneca Foods packing facility in Glencoe had 33 confirmed and 12 suspected cases. Although about 200 workers had been tested on arrival, test results were delayed by more than 10 days.

==== August 18 ====
MDH Covid data results from August 18, 2020, included a backlog of tests loaded into system. https://www.health.state.mn.us/diseases/coronavirus/situation.html#testingm1

==== August 21 ====
The state had 15 cases traced to the Sturgis Motorcycle Rally, with more cases expected. Although public health notices were issued for rally locations including One-Eyed Jack's Saloon, The Knuckle Saloon, The Broken Spoke, and Asylum Tattoo in Sturgis, and for the Bumpin' Buffalo Bar and Grill in Hill City, some cases among Minnesota rallygoers could not be traced to specific locations. A Minnesota public health official urged anyone who had traveled to Sturgis to monitor for symptoms for 14 days, adding that "if you are feeling ill after returning from the event, please get tested and self-isolate while you wait for the test results."

Between June 12 and August 21, 29 restaurants in Minnesota had outbreaks. Two of the largest clusters were in Mankato and St. Cloud, with 118 and 117 cases respectively.

==== August 22 ====
A cluster of cases was linked to a wedding held in Ghent.

==== August 24 ====
The state had a total of 27 cases traced to the Sturgis Motorcycle Rally. Twenty-five cases were among attendees, and two cases were employees or volunteers at the event.

==== August 26 ====
MDH Covid data results from August 26, 2020, included a backlog of tests loaded into system. https://www.health.state.mn.us/diseases/coronavirus/situation.html#testingm1

==== August 29 ====
At least 21 clusters of cases associated with parties, weddings, funerals and other social gatherings were identified in August. During the preceding week, cases were traced to 29 Minnesota bars and restaurants, and one or more cases were reported in 51 Minnesota colleges and universities. More Sturgis rallygoers tested positive, for a total of 46 Minnesota infections linked directly to Sturgis. Secondary transmission and positive cases were identified among contacts of Sturgis attendees.

==== August 31 ====
Cases traced to Sturgis attendees rose to 49. Minnesota Department of Health (MDH) Commissioner Jan Malcolm said that cases had plateaued at a high level, and "now we're starting to inch back up again. We have not improved." Over the weekend, there were 1,032 new cases on Saturday, and 934 on Sunday, "also one of the highest days yet."

=== September 2020 ===
==== September 1 ====
Cases remained high, with 502 cases announced on this day. Rural LeSeur County had over 15% case positivity. "Health officials have shifted their concern from urban bars and, to some extent, statewide youth sporting events. They look now to a routine sort of abandonment of health guidance at everyday informal social gatherings."

MDH Covid data results from September 1, 2020, included a backlog of tests loaded into system. https://www.health.state.mn.us/diseases/coronavirus/situation.html#testingm1

==== September 2 ====
A news story stated that "nearly half of an Iowa National Guard battalion that came to train at Camp Ripley in Minnesota this summer became sick with or were exposed to COVID-19."

==== September 8 ====
Winona State University began a 14-day campus quarantine, citing "an increase in asymptomatic transmission." Cases had risen from 97 on August 30 to 209 on September 6.

==== September 24 ====
The Minnesota Department of Health infectious disease director said that "more and more" outbreaks were workplaces and social settings. A workplace outbreak is defined as three or more employee cases.

89 case clusters were in businesses regulated by the state's Department of Agriculture, 40 clusters or outbreaks in meat processing plants, 182 clusters in manufacturing plants and 246 clusters in other general types of businesses.

77 bars and restaurants had been investigated for possible outbreaks. Of these, 47 had enough cases to be considered an outbreak, and have their names released to the media. 37 outbreaks had been associated with weddings, 11 with funerals, 22 with gyms and 62 with other social settings.

==== September 29 ====
The Minnesota Vikings suspended operations after eight members of an opposing team tested positive.

==== September 30 ====
A campaign rally at Duluth International Airport was Donald Trump's last large rally before he tested positive. Many attendees did not wear masks.

=== October 2020 ===
==== October 3 ====
At least two elected officials who attended the Trump rally in Duluth announced they would seek testing and self-quarantine.

==== October 9 ====
Nine cases were tied to a Trump rally held in Bemidji on September 18, including two hospitalizations and one person in intensive care.

==== October 15 ====
MDH Covid data results from October 15, 2020, included a backlog of tests loaded into system. https://www.health.state.mn.us/diseases/coronavirus/situation.html#testingm1

==== October 17 ====
The Minnesota Department of Health reported that 27 out of the 28 cases linked to political rallies were tied to Trump events. Attendees at the September 18 Trump rally in Bemidji had 16 cases, with an additional four cases linked to a counter-protest. Three cases were linked to the September 30 Trump rally in Duluth. Three cases were linked to a speech by Mike Pence in Minneapolis on September 24. One case was linked to an Eric Trump visit to Becker on October 1. One case was linked to Joe Biden's Duluth visit on September 18.

==== October 26 ====
A campaign rally by Vice President Mike Pence in Hibbing had "more than 650 people in attendance, exceeding Minnesota health guidelines to restrict crowds to 250 people." Just two days earlier, at least five aides to Pence, including his chief of staff Marc Short, had tested positive.

The seven-day average of new cases in two counties which had political rallies rose substantially in the following month, according to Johns Hopkins University, from 2.85 to 14.57 new cases a day in Beltrami County, where Bemidji is located, and from just under 180 to over 266 new cases a day in Hennepin County. This was part of an overall upward trend of new cases in the state of Minnesota which began September 10.

=== November 2020 ===
==== November 14 ====
MDH Covid data results from November 14, 2020, included a backlog of tests loaded into system. https://www.health.state.mn.us/diseases/coronavirus/situation.html#testingm1

=== December 2020 ===
==== December 14 ====
The Reopen Minnesota Coalition, consisting of over 150 Minnesota restaurants, bars, gyms, and other businesses, plan to defy an extension of the November 20 "dial-back" restrictions aimed at controlling the spread of the virus. The orders prohibit all indoor dining and closed gyms and fitness centers. Businesses face fines of $1,000 and their owners face 90 days of jail if the disobey the orders, which are scheduled to expire on December 18.

=== January 2021 ===
==== January 7 ====
The total laboratory tests are 5,803,829. Total PCR tests are 5,553,851. Total antigen tests are 249,978. Total positive cases are 429,570. Total confirmed cases (PCR positive) are 413,653. Total probable cases (antigen positive) are 15,917. Total hospitalizations are 22,541. Total ICU hospitalizations are 4733. Total deaths are 5572. Total no longer needing isolation are 408,510. All data above is cumulative. The increase rate of death rate is about the same as the past few months which is 300 people per week on average.

==== January 29 ====
FDA can't help people get a COVID-19 vaccine, but people can use CDC to find more detailed information about clinics and healthy centers. The FDA also approved an application of drug (furosemide injection).

=== February 2021 ===
==== February 12 ====
The increment of vaccinations are stay flat. The confirmed COVID-19 cases have decreased from 60,000 to about 57,000. Over 75% of residents had been vaccined and about 40% of them has taken at least one booster.

==== February 21 ====
The number of people who take vaccine is increasing about the same rate. There is no sign of weather delays and more than a half of vaccinations are second dose. Currently, 465,382 people are off isolation which is about 97 percent of all isolation people.

=== March 2021 ===
==== March 19 ====
The rate of vaccination rises to 24 percent (at least one dose). Carver County has an outbreak because of the U.K. strain and youth sports. Public health leaders will keep close to this situation. hospitalizations is going up because of the active cases.

==== March 30 ====
1.6 million residents in MN has received at least one dose of vaccine, including more than 81% of people whose age is older than 65. Actives cases is increasing and hospitalizations are up. States has decided to open vaccine eligibility to all adults.

==== March 31 ====
Governor Tim Walz received the single-shot of Johnson & Johnson vaccine. He said wherever we live and whoever we vote for, we need to end this pandemic, and the best way is to take a vaccine.

=== April 2021 ===
==== April 19 ====
More than a half of all Minnesota residents have taken at least one dose. 36% of people have been fully vaccinated. The number of death case is 7,026 until April 19. ICU trends is about the winter levels.

==== April 28 ====
Tim Walz on Tuesday said he is planning to have a more loosening of restrictions, such as increasing the limitation of the capacity of bars, restaurants and other public spaces. About 56% of Minnesota residents have taken at least one dose, which increased by 2% within two weeks. A sad news: A first grader in southwestern Minnesota died Sunday because of COVID-19 complications. Meanwhile, more than 56,000 kids have been tested positive since the pandemic started.

=== May 2021 ===
==== May 28 ====
The government has announced that capacity restrictions on bars and restaurants will be lifted. Daily COVID-19 cases are also dropping to very low rates. Active cases have decreased 75% from a high of 20,000 in April. Hospitalization rates are also going down and are reaching a low point since March. At this point, more than 2.8 million people in Minnesota who are 16 or older have at least one dose of some sort of vaccine.

==== May 30 ====
At this point, Minnesota has an average rate of less than 400 daily COVID cases. This is lowest it has been in 11 months. The COVID test positivity rate is also at its lowest point (barely over 2%) since the beginning of the pandemic. The vaccine rate is decreased to only an average of 23,000 daily administered shots, a low since January.

=== June 2021 ===
==== June 21 ====
Since before the pandemic, active cases fall below 1,000 cases for the first time. Vaccination rates are slowing down drastically. It is projected that Minnesota will only hit 70% vaccination rate for people who are 16 years or older in early August. As of this point, 62.5% of eligible people are completely vaccinated with 66.4% having at least one shot.

==== June 29 ====
Minnesota has now consistently been below 100 daily cases. There are also no new deaths that have been reported (deaths caused by COVID). This a drastic decrease from November's 7,000 daily cases. Vaccination rates are still stagnant with only 10,000 daily shots administered. COVID testing sites begin to close in places like Crookston and Wadena due to the decrease in demand for COVID tests.

=== July 2021 ===
==== July 7 ====
Daily cases increase slightly, but still very low (comparable to rates in April 2020). This is possible to the slow reports coming in from the July 4 weekend. There are no new COVID related deaths over the July 4 weekend. COVID reporting is reported to change from Minnesota due to the very low case rates and hospitalization rates. COVID deaths will be reported by the actual date of death instead on the date it was reported. Also reports won't be posted on weekends and stop reporting the 14-day case rate from counties each week. Metro Transit also reported that it will resume some bus services.

==== July 13 ====
COVID cases go up a little bit, but it is nothing alarming in the sense that another lockdown will happen. Hospitalization rates are constant at around 100 cases. Minnesota also saw COVID related deaths to be at 3 deaths every day. This has not been this low since the early weeks of the pandemic. Cases are high in black Minnesotans due to vaccination rates being much lower compared to white or Asian Minnesotans. The delta variant is also becoming more of a threat in Minnesota and no vaccine that is available is 100% effective against COVID.

=== August 2021 ===
==== August 17 ====
COVID cases have been increases as at this time, Minnesota has seen 3,054 new COVID cases. This is biggest increase Minnesota has seen since April. Cases are being found mostly in people who aren't vaccinated, but this includes children who are not able to get the vaccine. The COVID test positivity rate is at 5.21%.This increase is making health officials recommending that boosters should be administered at least 8 months after being completely vaccinated. Minnesota has reached 70% of people in Minnesota who are 16 or older that have at least one dose of any COVID vaccine. COVID cases from kids that need hospitalization has increased to 2.2% compared to the less than 1% rate in the fall.

==== August 27 ====
At this point, the increase of cases isn't as bad compared to the previous spring and fall, but the daily cases per day has risen to 1,500 cases. This is 3 times greater compared to the beginning of August. This may be due to the delta variant. Hospital care have also increased, but have not reached a peak yet. Over half of every age group that is able to get the vaccine has at least one shot. Health officials are concerned about the spread of COVID pertaining to younger people. Health Department has said that 324 COVID cases have been confirmed pertaining to schools, summer camps, and other similar places. This is an increase of 50% percent.

== Responses ==
=== State government ===
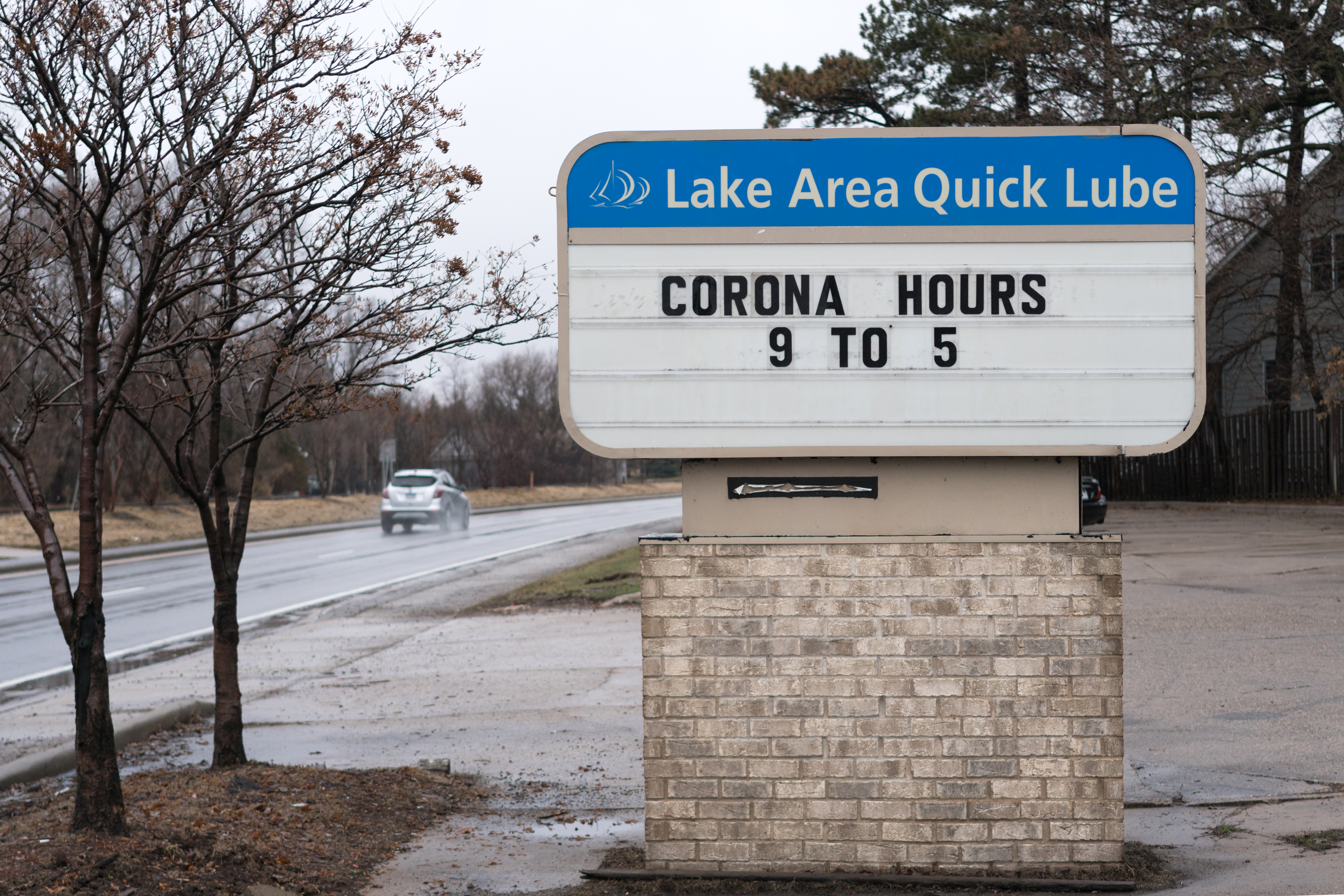
"Corona Hours" sign at the Lake Area Quick Lube in White Bear Lake, Minnesota- Auto Repair and Maintenance shops are considered "essential businesses"

On March 10, Minnesota Governor Tim Walz signed a bill dedicating $20.8 million to state coronavirus response. On March 13, Governor Walz declared a peacetime state of emergency.

On March 15, Governor Walz authorized the temporary closing of all public K-12 schools from March 18 until at least March 27. On March 25, this closure was extended to May 4.

On March 16, the Minnesota legislature began scaling back operations and meeting on an on-call basis. Governor Walz also ordered the closure of public places, including all: restaurants, bars, coffee shops, gyms, theaters, breweries, ski resorts, and other public places until at least March 27. Bars and restaurants in the state were closed only to dine-in customers; the businesses were allowed to continue to serve customers by take-out or delivery. On March 25, this order was extended until May 1.

On March 25, Governor Walz issued a stay-at-home order, stating that at this point it was too late to "flatten the curve" with relation to new cases. The stay-at-home order required Minnesotans to restrict activity outside the home from 11:59 p.m. on March 27 until 5 p.m. on April 10. While the order did continue the closure of bars, restaurants, movie theaters, hair salons, and other "non-essential" locations, the majority of workplaces still remained open for some employees in order to provide "essential services." Businesses deemed "essential" included mechanics (bike and auto), chiropractors, grocery stores, any store that sold food or drink including bakeries, butcher shops, liquor stores, and even popcorn shops. Many restaurants remained open for take-out and curbside pickup. Many retail stores also maintained a skeleton staff and offered curbside pickup, or only allowed a few people in the store at one time.

On April 10, Governor Tim Walz extended his stay-at-home order (Executive Order 20–33) until May 3 at 11:59 PM. He cited his reason for doing so was that new data and new discoveries about COVID-19 had emerged since the original order was put in place. He also allowed hardware and garden shops to open so long as they follow all the Minnesota Department of Health guidelines.

On April 17, Governor Walz announced that it was now permitted for people to engage in various outdoor activities such as hiking, fishing, hunting, and motor-boating so long as they maintained a safe and reasonable distance from other people. Golf courses and bait shops were also permitted to open. Walz clearly stated these plans were conceptualized before the President's tweet and the civilian protest.

On April 30, Governor Tim Walz extended the stay at home order for Minnesota to Sunday May 17 at 11:59 PM. He stated that staying home is the most powerful weapon to "defeat" the virus and that "we must run the full marathon and not stop at mile 20". Furthermore, he required certain personnel to wear face masks and strongly urged the general public to do the same.

On May 13, Governor Tim Walz allowed his stay-at-home order for Minnesota to expire on Sunday May 17 at 11:59 PM, so that Minnesota would enter into a second phase of fighting the virus. He thanked Minnesotans for their sacrifices and efforts to curb the virus. On May 18, most businesses were able to open but must adhere to the Minnesota's Department of Health's guidelines. However, pubs and restaurants must remain closed; a decision regarding reopening these businesses would be made no later than 30 May. Minnesotans can gather in groups of up to 10 people with close family and friends.

On May 21, Governor Tim Walz allowed all restaurants and pubs with outdoor seating to open on June 1 at 50% capacity and by reservation only. Hair salons were allowed to open at 50% capacity and reservation only. All workers in these businesses are required to wear face masks at all times while on the clock, and customers are strongly encouraged to do the same.

On June 5, Governor Tim Walz allowed all restaurants, pubs, gyms, and other indoor entertainment venues to open indoor dining at 25-50% capacity. Gatherings of people indoors were limited to 10 people; however 25 people can gather if the gathering takes place outdoors. He also thanked Minnesotans for their sacrifices and patience, but warned that if cases start increasing, than he may have to close businesses.

Governor Walz announced a statewide mask mandate on July 22. Beginning July 25, the mandate required that face masks be worn in stores, public buildings, and indoor spaces where people congregate.

On September 25, a joint coronavirus survey by the Minnesota Department of Health and the CDC was halted, due to threatening behaviors and racial slurs directed at survey workers.

On October 2, two days after a Trump campaign rally in Duluth, a Minnesota Department of Health official said that "anyone who was in direct contact with President Trump or known Covid-19 cases needs to quarantine and should get tested." President Trump announced he had tested positive for coronavirus the day after hosting the rally, along with staff members who had traveled with him.

On November 18, Governor Tim Walz introduced his new "Dial Back Minnesota". This four week plan started on November 20 and it closes down all pubs, restaurants, gyms, as well as all indoor and outdoor events that are "non-essential"; even events that are held inside a private house. Furthermore, this order discourages all non-essential travel and asks Minnesotans to stay home whenever possible, especially during the Thanksgiving Holiday. He imposed these new restrictions due to the rising number of cases in the state as well as multiple hospitals requesting a second stay-at-home order in order to be able to have the capacity to serve every patient.

On September 15, 2021, Minnesota Department of Health announced the release of the Docket® app to expand consumer access to the Minnesota Immunization Information Connection (MIIC).

On September 16, 2021, Governor Tim Walz announced the launch of a new program that will provide $100 on-site incentives for COVID-19 vaccines at community vaccination clinics across Minnesota.

On October 1, 2021, Governor Tim Walz announced the state will host a Twin Cities Con vaccination clinic at the Minneapolis Convention Center. Governor Tim Walz and the Minnesota Vikings announced two new vaccination clinics and on-site reward giveaways at Vikings home games on October 3 and 10. Governor Tim Walz announced the state's Duluth COVID-19 community testing site, located at the Duluth Entertainment Convention Center (DECC), will double its daily capacity and add a weekend testing day.

On October 4, 2021, Governor Tim Walz announced that the state has extended the deadline for public and tribal schools to apply for grant funding to October 15, 2021.

On October 13, 2021, Governor Tim Walz announced that a new COVID-19 community testing site will open in Morris.

On October 15, 2021, Governor Tim Walz announced a comprehensive COVID-19 action plan to relieve Minnesota's overburdened hospitals and provide new rapid testing options for Minnesotans.

On October 18, 2021, Governor Tim Walz announced the launch of "Kids Deserve a Shot," a vaccine incentive program designed to encourage Minnesotans aged 12 to 17 to get fully vaccinated against COVID-19.

On October 21, 2021, Governor Tim Walz and U.S. Bank Stadium announced a new vaccination clinic outside U.S. Bank Stadium on October 24 from 3:00 p.m. to 8:00 p.m. before the Rolling Stones concert.

On October 27, 2021, after the US Food and Drug Administration Advisory Committee voted to recommend the use of the Pfizer vaccine in children 5–11 years old, Governor Walz announced Minnesota's plan to administer the COVID-19 vaccine to children ages 5–11.

On October 28, 2021, Governor Tim Walz and the Minnesota Vikings announced another vaccination clinic and on-site reward giveaway to be held on October 31 at the Vikings' home game. Boosters will be given to eligible Minnesotans in addition to the first and second doses.

On October 29, 2021, Governor Tim Walz announced the increase of COVID-19 first dose vaccinations by nearly 40% among Minnesotans aged 12 to 17.

On November 2, 2021, Governor Tim Walz announced an initial list of states experiences that will be awarded to winners of the 'Kids Deserve a Shot' vaccine incentives campaign's weekly drawings.

As part of the Governor's action plan to relieve hospitals overburdened by those requiring COVID-19 care, Governor Tim Walz announced the first skilled-nursing facility to serve as an alternative care site.

On November 3, 2021, Governor Tim Walz announced that the state will begin vaccinating children that week, after an extensive clinical trial and final CDC recommendations for the Pfizer COVID-19 vaccine for 5- to 11-year-olds.

On November 9, 2021, Governor Tim Walz announced the open registration form to claim a $200 Visa gift card for Minnesota parents to their fully vaccinated 12- to 17-year-olds.

On November 10, 2021, Governor Tim Walz announced that a second skilled-nursing facility will serve as an alternative care site. Governor Tim Walz also announced three new COVID-19 rapid testing opportunities and a new saliva PCR testing site to expand network of community testing sites.

On November 11, 2021, Minnesota Department of Health (MDH) hosted over 1,000 community COVID-19 vaccination events in collaboration with Minnesota community organizations and providers according to Governor Tim Walz, since February.

On November 17, 2021, Governor Tim Walz announced that the federal government has agreed to his urgent request for emergency staffing assistance at Minnesota hospitals and that two Department of Defense medical teams will be dispatched to hospitals to relieve doctors and nurses treating COVID-19 and other patients.

On November 19, 2021, Following an expansion of eligibility by federal public health officials, Governor Tim Walz announced that all fully vaccinated Minnesota adults can now get COVID-19 booster shots.

On November 22, 2021, Governor Tim Walz announced his steps to support Minnesota's long-term care facilities and continued to address hospital capacity concerns as the state's health-care system faces growing strains as a result of COVID-19.

On November 23, 2021, Governor Tim Walz announced that the Minnesota Department of Health (MDH) and M Health Fairview are expanding access to monoclonal antibodies COVID-19 treatments in the Twin Cities and Greater Minnesota . Governor Tim Walz also announced that Minnesota is a national leader in immunizing children aged 5 to 11 years old and providing booster doses to adults.

On December 1, 2021, Governor Tim Walz announced that a federal medical team will arrive in Minnesota to increase access to COVID-19 monoclonal antibody treatments and expand capacity at the state's popular Mall of America community vaccination location.

On December 2, 2021, Governor Tim Walz announced that a third federal emergency medical team will be arriving in Minnesota to assist hospitals. Governor Tim Walz also issued the statement on the state's first case of the Omicron COVID-19 variant.

On December 3, 2021, Governor Tim Walz announced that Minnesota will increase the number of COVID-19 at-home rapid tests and booster shots available to Minnesota families.

On December 6, 2021, Governor Tim Walz announced a new initiative to recruit, train, and deploy at least 1,000 new certified nursing assistants by the end of January for Minnesota long-term care facilities with staffing shortages. Governor Tim Walz also announced the deployment of the first three National Guard skilled-nursing response teams to help long-term care facilities that are experiencing severe staffing shortages.

On December 8, 2021, Governor Tim Walz announced a new "Celebrate Safely, Minnesota" campaign, a statewide effort to connect Minnesotans to the resources they need to celebrate the holidays safely.

On December 9, 2021, Following an expansion of eligibility by federal public health officials, Governor Tim Walz announced that Minnesotans aged 16 and 17 can now receive a Pfizer COVID-19 booster dose.

On December 10, 2021, Governor Tim Walz announced $2.86 million in funding to help Minnesota children who are experiencing a behavioral health crisis, as well as support the state's hospitals as they continue to deal with COVID-19's limited capacity.

On December 13, 2021, Governor Tim Walz announced Ben Truax of Rochester as the winner of the second $100,000 Minnesota college scholarship drawing for the 'Kids Deserve a Shot' campaign.

On December 15, 2021, The nation score card was released, POLITICO ranked Minnesota among the top five states for COVID-19 response.

On December 16, 2021, Following his appeal to President Biden for additional support, Governor Tim Walz announced that the federal government's emergency staffing support at two Minnesota hospitals will be extended. Governor Tim Walz also announced an increase in testing capacity in the state's COVID-19 community testing network in anticipation of increased demand before the holidays as part of the Walz-Flanagan Administration's 'Celebrate Safely, Minnesota' campaign.

On December 21, 2021, Governor Tim Walz issued a statement regarding positive COVID-19 testing. Governor Tim Walz also reminded Minnesotans the effective steps they can take to celebrate this holiday season safely.

On December 28, 2021, As the state continues to respond to the COVID-19 pandemic, Governor Tim Walz announced the allocation of $47 million in federal American Recue Plan funds.

On January 4, 2022, New COVID-19 testing resources for Minnesotans across the state were announced by Governor Tim Walz, this includes new community testing sites in the Twin Cities and east-central Minnesota, expanded rapid testing availability, and more tests for schools.

On January 6, 2022, Governor Tim Walz announced that the Minnesota National Guard and the Minnesota Department of Health will open a new COVID-19 community testing site in Anoka on Friday, January 7.

On January 7, 2022, Governor Tim Walz announced that a new community vaccination site will open at Oakdale on January 9 to provide first and second doses to Minnesotans 5 and older, as well as booster doses to Minnesotans 12 and older.

Governor Tim Walz also announced that the COVID-19 Community Testing Sites in Inver Grove Heights and Stillwater will be temporarily expanded following week to help increase capacity and accessibility for Minnesotans seeking COVID-19 tests.

On January 11, 2022, Governor Tim Walz announced the launch of the next phase of the 'Kids Deserve a Shot' vaccine incentive program, the goal is to encourage Minnesota families to fully vaccinate their children aged 5 to 11 years old against COVID-19. Governor Tim Walz also announced new measures to address severe staffing shortages threatening the health and safety of older Minnesotans and people with disabilities.

On January 12, 2022, Governor Tim Walz announced that he will provide $40 million in additional funding to help support hospital staffing in Minnesota during current COVID-19 outbreak caused by the Omicron variant.

On January 13, 2022, Governor Tim Walz announced that he will provide $40 million in new funding to Minnesota to continue to expand COVID-19 testing resources. Governor Tim Walz also announced that the state's Community Vaccination Clinic at the Mall of America will administer 200,000 COVID-19 vaccine doses that week, bringing the total number of doses administered by the state's Community Vaccination Clinics to nearly 840,000.

On January 19, 2022, Governor Tim Walz announced that more than 100 nurses will begin arriving at health care facilities across the state immediately after taking urgent action to provide staffing assistance for short-staffed Minnesota hospitals.

On January 20, 2022, Governor Tim Walz and Lieutenant Governor Peggy Flanagan announced a series of proposals to expand economic opportunity in Minnesota such as the $700 million in direct payments to Minnesotans via Walz Checks. The announcement came after the release of their Local Jobs and Projects Plan for 2022 earlier that week.

On January 21, 2022, Governor Tim Walz announced that a new COVID-19 testing site at the Minnesota Department of Transportation (MnDOT) Building in Saint Paul will open on Tuesday, Jan. 25, with up to 1,000 tests per day.

On January 24, 2022, Governor Tim Walz announced that the registration form for parents to claim their $200 Visa gift card for immunizing their 5 to 11-year-old children was available. Minnesota families with children aged 5 to 11 who received both doses of the COVID-19 vaccine in January and February were eligible for a $200 gift card.

On January 25, 2022, Governor Tim Walz and Lieutenant Governor Peggy Flanagan unveiled proposals in the Walz-Flanagan Budget, the Governor and Lieutenant Governor's supplemental budget recommendation for the upcoming legislative session, to support Minnesota children and families.

On January 26, 2022, Governor Tim Walz and Lieutenant Governor Peggy Flanagan unveiled proposals in the Walz-Flanagan Budget , the Governor and Lieutenant Governor's supplemental budget goal is to protect Minnesotans' health and safety. The budget aimed at supporting children and families, as well as investing in local jobs and projects.

On January 27, 2022, Governor Tim Walz announced that the state will distribute 2.1 million KN95 masks to community groups, local public health agencies, schools, and other organizations in order to ensure that Minnesotans have access to high-quality masks during the current COVID-19 outbreak.

On January 28, 2022, Governor Tim Walz announced a series of emergency measures to assist Minnesota hospitals in dealing with high patient counts caused by the Omicron variant of COVID-19.

On January 31, 2022, Governor Tim Walz and Lieutenant Governor Peggy Flanagan released the Walz-Flanagan Budget, which is the Governor and Lieutenant Governor's supplemental budget proposal for the current legislative session to boost Minnesota economy.

=== City governments ===
On March 14, St. Paul Mayor Melvin Carter declared a State of Local Emergency. The city will no longer be issuing any new permits for gatherings of 50 or more people. He also requested that Ramsey County police suspend all evictions. The St. Paul Public Library, St. Paul Schools, and all parks and recreation centers including the Como Zoo were also closed from March 16 through March 27.

In March, the City of Red Wing, Minnesota suspended city facilities and shut down the city library due to health concerns. On March 31, Red Wing reported its first cases at a corrections facility.

On July 29, Minneapolis Mayor Jacob Frey issued an emergency order declaring that all Minneapolis indoor bars, which recently reopened, would once again close effective August 1. Taprooms, distilleries, nightclubs and restaurants with a bar area will close again as well.

In late 2025, the Minnesota Department of Health fully integrated COVID-19 monitoring into a unified "Viral Respiratory Illness" dashboard. This system tracks SARS-CoV-2 alongside influenza and RSV to provide a broader view of seasonal public health trends.

== Impact ==
=== Social ===
COVID-19 killed 1,130 people in Hennepin County as of December 2020. The city gave free coronavirus tests and flu shots. During the COVID-19 pandemic, most utilities and city business continued, some with reduced service, and shutoffs were suspended. Wifi was free city-wide and government was conducted online. In Minnesota, 1 in 2 black workers lost their jobs, compared to 1 in 4 whites. The pandemic furthered health inequities in Minneapolis and Minnesota. Researchers found that the rates of cases, hospitalization, and deaths for Black and Latino residents were higher than for White residents.

Minneapolis public schools began the 2020–2021 academic year with remote leaning for all grade levels. The city's public school district lost 2.8 percent of their students in 2020.

34% of Minnesotans reported a loss in employment income in April 2020, just after the COVID-19 pandemic began (Census Bureau, Household Pulse Survey). A loss of employment income cause direct impact for living expenses, retirement savings, and emergency expenses. More than 500,000 continued unemployment claims were filed at its peak in April and May 2020.

Several chronic health conditions, such as diabetes, obesity, asthma, cancer, COPD, and high blood pressure, were identified as COVID-19 risk factors. Consistent and accessible health care is required for the treatment and care of these chronic conditions. Seeking care for one of these conditions could have been difficult with the capacity of hospitals and hospital staff being tested with the onset of various COVID-19 spikes.

According to the Pulse survey, nearly 20 million adults lived in households where they didn't get enough to eat in October 2021, 12 million adult renters were behind on their rent, and some of the progress made since late March appeared to have stalled as other economic problems persisted.

During the COVID-19 pandemic, communities of color and immigrants in Minnesota's workforce are bearing economic hardship and health risks impacts.

Black Minnesotans accounted for 7.5% of COVID-19 deaths. Since African Americans make up about 7% of Minnesota's population, there appears to be little racial disparity in COVID-19-related deaths between Black and White Minnesotans at first glance.

=== Sports ===
Most of the state's sports teams were affected. Several leagues began postponing or suspending their seasons starting March 12. Major League Baseball cancelled the remainder of spring training on that date, and on March 16, they announced that the season will be postponed indefinitely, after the recommendations from the CDC to restrict events of more than 50 people for the next eight weeks, affecting the Minnesota Twins. Also on March 12, the National Basketball Association announced the season would be suspended for 30 days, affecting the Minnesota Timberwolves. In the National Hockey League, the season was suspended for an indefinite amount of time, affecting the Minnesota Wild.

The 2020 X Games and the 2021 U.S. Pond Hockey Championships were canceled. Minneapolis hosting of a Coop FIS Cross-Country Ski World Cup race at Theodore Wirth Park, the first to be held in United States in two decades, was also canceled.

In college sports, the National Collegiate Athletic Association canceled all winter and spring tournaments, most notably the Division I men's and women's basketball tournaments, affecting colleges and universities statewide. The 2020 NCAA Division I Wrestling Championships were scheduled for March 19–21 at Minneapolis' U.S. Bank Stadium. By March 11, the NCAA had announced the championship would continue, but none of the anticipated 100,000 fans would be allowed to attend. The following day the NCAA canceled all spring championships.

On March 16, the National Junior College Athletic Association also canceled the remainder of the winter seasons as well as the spring seasons.

On March 21, the Brainerd Jaycees announced the cancelation of the Run for the Lakes Marathon and all other races taking place over the marathon weekend, which was scheduled for April 24–25. The COVID-19 pandemic ended the 11-year streak of consecutive marathon runnings.

Grandma's Marathon was held annually for 43 years, making it one of the oldest continually-run marathons in the country. But on March 31, the staff announced that the June 16, 2020, race was canceled due to concerns of spreading SARS-CoV-2.

On April 2, race officials decided to cancel the Lake Wobegon Trail Marathon for the first time since the race began in 2008. The race runs on the state trail from Holdingford, Minnesota, to St. Joseph, Minnesota.

By April 6, nearly 1,000 people in the state had contracted COVID-19, and the Rochester, Minnesota-based Med City Marathon race organizers decided to postpone their race weekend from May 23–24 to September 4–5. It canceled June 20. The race directors wrote "after conversations with the Minnesota Department of Health, members of the Minnesota Running Industry Task Force, the USATF, Mayo Clinic Emergency Medicine physicians, our sponsors and community leaders on how we could safely race, we came to the conclusion that it just isn't possible with so many ongoing uncertainties surrounding the COVID-19 pandemic."

The Twin Cities Marathon canceled June 22, more than three months before the race. It was the first cancelation of the race since it began in 1982. The Mankato Marathon canceled July 24 after initially announcing June 1 that the race was still on. The Bemidji Blue Ox Marathon, set to run in October, followed in cancelation July 28.

=== Economy ===
==== Minneapolis ====
The COVID-19 pandemic closed hundreds of restaurants in Minneapolis. Among them are Fuji Ya, the landmark of 60 years, and Bachelor Farmer, site of fundraisers for then-President Obama and for the Democratic National Committee. The 41 year old weekly newspaper City Pages closed for lack of advertising. City officials struggled to support the needs of local businesses, particularly small- and minority-owned establishments, that were dually challenged by the COVID-19 pandemic and historic unrest and property destruction in the aftermath of George Floyd's murder on May 25, 2020.

Mobility for retail and recreation by Minneapolitans was down 42% as of December 1, compared to 26% nationwide, showing that people are staying home. Job loss in the Twin Cities area has been 67,000 lodging and food services jobs between the second quarters of 2019 and 2020.

First Avenue's Dayna Frank, president of the National Independent Venue Association (NIVA), successfully lobbied the US federal government for aid for clubs and stages across the nation.

== See also ==
- 2020 Minneapolis homeless encampments
- Timeline of the COVID-19 pandemic in the United States
- COVID-19 pandemic in the United States – for impact on the country
- COVID-19 pandemic – for impact on other countries
