= Timeline of the COVID-19 pandemic in the United States (2021) =

The following is a timeline of the COVID-19 pandemic in the United States during 2021.

== Timeline ==
Cases

Deaths

=== January ===
==== January 1 ====
- On January 1, the U.S. passed 20 million cases, representing an increase of more than one million over the past week. By comparison, it had taken the country 292 days to pass 10 million cases, whereas it passed 20 million in 54 days.

==== January 4 ====
- On January 4, a confirmed case of a new, more contagious SARS-CoV-2 variant from the United Kingdom was reported in New York. The patient is a man in his 60s living in Saratoga County in Upstate New York, who had no travel history to the United Kingdom.

==== January 5 ====
- On January 5, a confirmed case of a new, more contagious SARS-CoV-2 variant from the United Kingdom was reported in Georgia. The patient is an 18-year-old male with no travel history.
- Also on January 5, the U.S. passed 21 million cases, just four days after passing 20 million cases.

==== January 6 ====
- On January 6, the Centers for Disease Control and Prevention (CDC) announced that it had found at least 52 confirmed cases of the more contagious SARS-CoV-2 variant: 26 in California, 22 in Florida, two in Colorado, and one each in Georgia and New York. The agency also stressed that there could already be more cases in the country.

==== January 7 ====
- On January 7, more cases of the variant were reported: two in Connecticut, one in Pennsylvania, and one in Texas.

==== January 9 ====
- On January 9, the U.S. passed 22 million cases.
- Also on January 9, five confirmed cases of a new, more contagious SARS-CoV-2 variant from the United Kingdom were reported in Minnesota.

==== January 11 ====
- On January 11, a confirmed case of a new, more contagious SARS-CoV-2 variant from the United Kingdom was reported in Indiana.

==== January 12 ====
- On January 12, two confirmed cases of a new, more contagious SARS-CoV-2 variant from the United Kingdom were reported in Maryland. The patients are a married couple in Anne Arundel County, one of whom had a traveling history to the United Kingdom.

==== January 13 ====
- On January 13, the U.S. passed 23 million cases, just four days after passing 22 million cases.
- Also on January 13, two confirmed cases of a new, more contagious SARS-CoV-2 variant from the United Kingdom were reported, one in New Mexico and the other in Wisconsin.

==== January 15 ====
- On January 15, three confirmed cases of a new, more contagious SARS-CoV-2 variant from the United Kingdom were reported, one in Illinois, one in Oregon, and one in Utah.

==== January 19 ====
- On January 19, the U.S. passed 24 million cases, just six days after passing 23 million cases.
- Also on January 19, the U.S. passed 400,000 COVID-19 deaths.

==== January 21 ====
- The National Strategy for the COVID-19 Response and Pandemic Preparedness is released.

==== January 22 ====
- On January 22, the U.S. passed 25 million cases, with one of every 13 Americans testing positive for COVID-19.

==== January 24 ====
- On January 24, the Capitol Police announced that 38 police officers have tested positive for COVID-19 since the January 6 riot at the United States Capitol.

==== January 25 ====
- On January 25, the U.S. reported its first case of a new SARS-CoV-2 variant from Brazil (P.1) in Minnesota in a person with travel history.

==== January 28 ====
- On January 28, the U.S. reported its first two cases of a new, possibly vaccine-resistant SARS-CoV-2 variant from South Africa (B.1.351) in South Carolina in two people from different parts of the state with no travel history.

=== February ===
==== February 1 ====
- On February 1, the U.S. passed 26 million cases.

==== February 7 ====
- On February 7, the U.S. passed 27 million cases.

==== February 20 ====
- On February 20, the U.S. passed 28 million cases.

==== February 22 ====
- On February 22, the U.S. passed 500,000 deaths, just five weeks after the country passed 400,000 deaths.

==== February 23 ====
- By February 23, more than 1,880 cases of the B.1.1.7 variant were reported in 45 states.

=== March ===
==== March 2 ====
- On March 2, Texas and Mississippi announced that they would fully reopen, with Texas scheduling it on March 10 and Mississippi scheduling it on March 3. Both states would continue to make recommendations but also repeal all mandates.

==== March 5 ====
- By March 5, more than 2,750 cases of COVID-19 variants were detected in 47 states; Washington, D.C.; and Puerto Rico. This number consisted of 2,672 cases of the B.1.1.7 variant, 68 cases of the B.1.351 variant, and 13 cases of the P.1 variant.

==== March 8 ====
- On March 8, the U.S. passed 29 million cases.

==== March 11 ====
- On March 11, President Joe Biden holds the first prime time address of his presidency. In it, he announced his plan to push states to make vaccines available to all adults by May 1, with the aim to make small gatherings possible by July 4.

==== March 24 ====
- On March 24, the U.S. passed 30 million cases, just as a number of states began to expand the eligibility age for COVID-19 vaccines.

==== March 27 ====
- By March 27, more than 8,000 cases of the B.1.1.7 variant were reported across 51 jurisdictions.

=== April ===
==== April 1 ====
- By April 1, more than 11,000 cases of the B.1.1.7 variant were reported, mostly in Florida and Michigan.

==== April 7 ====
- By April 7, the B.1.1.7 variant had become the dominant COVID-19 strain in the U.S.

==== April 9 ====
- On April 9, the U.S. passed 31 million cases.

==== April 12 ====
- On April 12, the U.S. reported its first six cases of a new "double mutant" SARS-CoV-2 variant from India (B.1.617) in California.

==== April 22 ====
- On April 22, the U.S. passed 32 million cases.

==== April 29 ====
- On April 29, the CDC estimated that roughly 35% of the U.S. population had been infected with the virus as of March 2021, about four times higher than the official reported numbers.

=== May ===
==== May 6 ====
- On May 6, a study by the Institute for Health Metrics and Evaluation estimated that the true COVID-19 death toll in the U.S. was more than 900,000 people.

==== May 13 ====
- On May 13, the CDC changed its guidance and said that fully vaccinated individuals do not need to wear masks in most situations.

==== May 19 ====
- On May 19, the U.S. passed 33 million cases.

=== June ===
==== June 15 ====
- On June 15, the U.S. passed 600,000 deaths.

=== July ===
==== July 7 ====
- By July 7, the Delta variant had surpassed the Alpha variant to become the dominant COVID-19 strain in the U.S., according to CDC data.

==== July 17 ====
- On July 17, the U.S. passed 34 million cases.

==== July 27 ====
- On July 27, based on updated information for fully vaccinated people that new evidence on the Delta variant had provided, CDC added a recommendation for those people to wear a mask in public indoor settings in areas of substantial or high transmission. CDC also made other recommendations based on this information.

=== August ===
==== August 1 ====
- On August 1, the U.S. passed 35 million cases.

==== August 10 ====
- On August 10, the U.S. passed 36 million cases.

==== August 18 ====
- On August 18, the U.S. passed 37 million cases.

==== August 24 ====
- On August 24, the U.S. passed 38 million cases.

==== August 31 ====
- On August 31, the U.S. passed 39 million cases.

=== September ===
==== September 7 ====
- On September 7, the U.S. passed 40 million cases.

==== September 13 ====
- On September 13, the U.S. passed 41 million cases.

==== September 15 ====
- By September 15, one in every 500 Americans had died from COVID-19.

==== September 18 ====
- On September 18, the U.S. passed 42 million cases.

==== September 20 ====
- By September 20, COVID-19 had killed over 675,000 Americans, the estimated number of American deaths from the Spanish flu in 1918. As a result, COVID-19 became the deadliest respiratory pandemic in American history.

==== September 27 ====
- On September 27, the U.S. passed 43 million cases.

=== October ===
==== October 1 ====
- On October 1, the U.S. passed 700,000 deaths.

==== October 7 ====
- On October 7, the U.S. passed 44 million cases, just nine days after the country surpassed 43 million cases.

==== October 18 ====
- On October 18, the U.S. passed 45 million cases.

=== November ===
==== November 1 ====
- On November 1, the U.S. passed 46 million cases.

==== November 13 ====
- On November 13, the U.S. passed 47 million cases.

==== November 25 ====
- On November 25, the U.S. passed 48 million cases.

==== November 26 ====
- On November 26, President Biden announced that the U.S. will restrict travel from South Africa and seven other African countries due to concerns over a new variant from the area, called Omicron.

=== December ===
==== December 1 ====
- The first confirmed case of the Omicron variant was detected.
