= Minnesota Department of Health =

Government organization in Saint Paul, United States

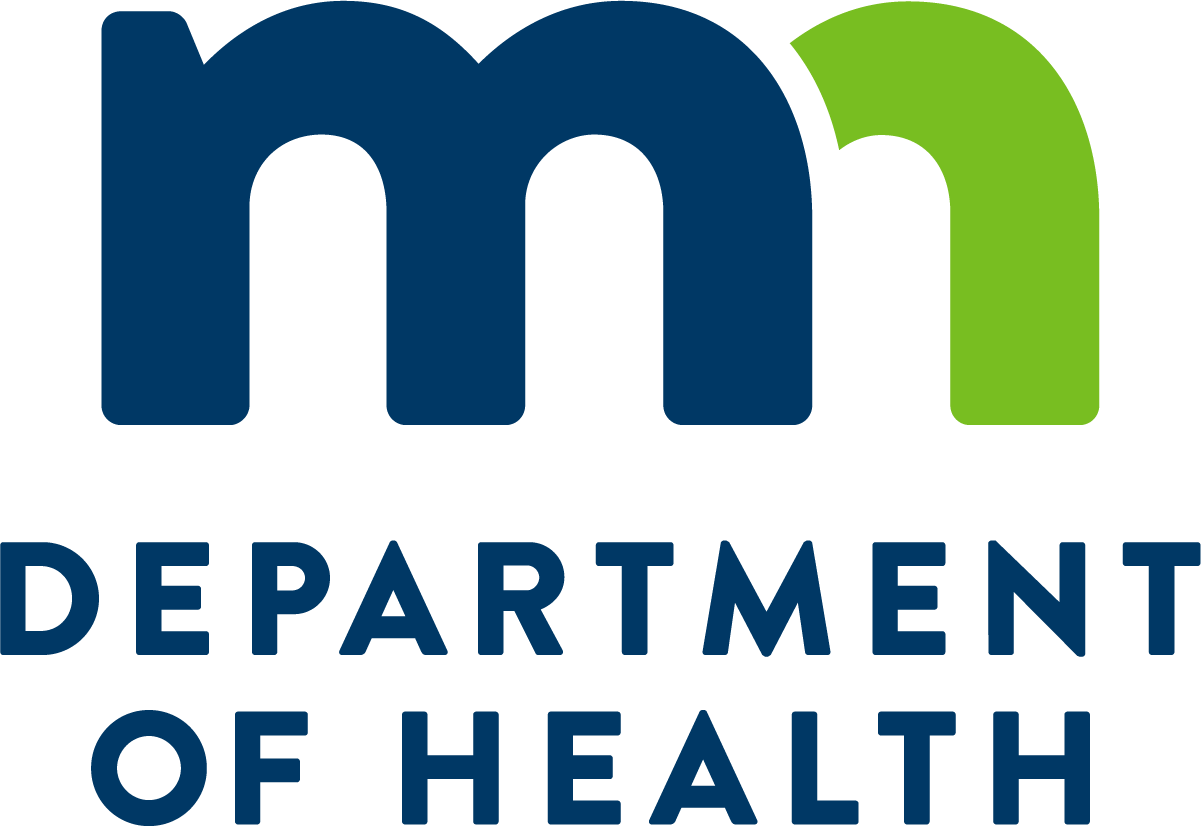

Department overview
- Formed: 1977; 49 years ago
- Headquarters: Saint Paul, Minnesota
- Employees: 1500
- Annual budget: $500 million
- Department executive: Brooke Cunningham, Commissioner
- Website: www.health.state.mn.us

The Minnesota Department of Health (MDH) is the state health agency of the State of Minnesota in the United States. The department has four offices in Saint Paul and seven outside of the Twin Cities metropolitan area: Bemidji, Duluth, Fergus Falls, Mankato, Marshall, Rochester, and St. Cloud.

The agency was established in 1977 after the abolition of the state board of health, which had existed since 1872.

The agency is responsible for Minnesotans' public health, including disease control and prevention, environmental health, public policy, and regulation of health care providers. Additionally, it runs an immunization program and reports on the quality of clinical care in hospitals and clinics across the state.

On September 15, 2021, the Minnesota Department of Health announced the release of Docket, a free mobile application that enables consumer access to the Minnesota Immunization Information Connection (MIIC) system.
