= COVID-19 pandemic on Grand Princess =

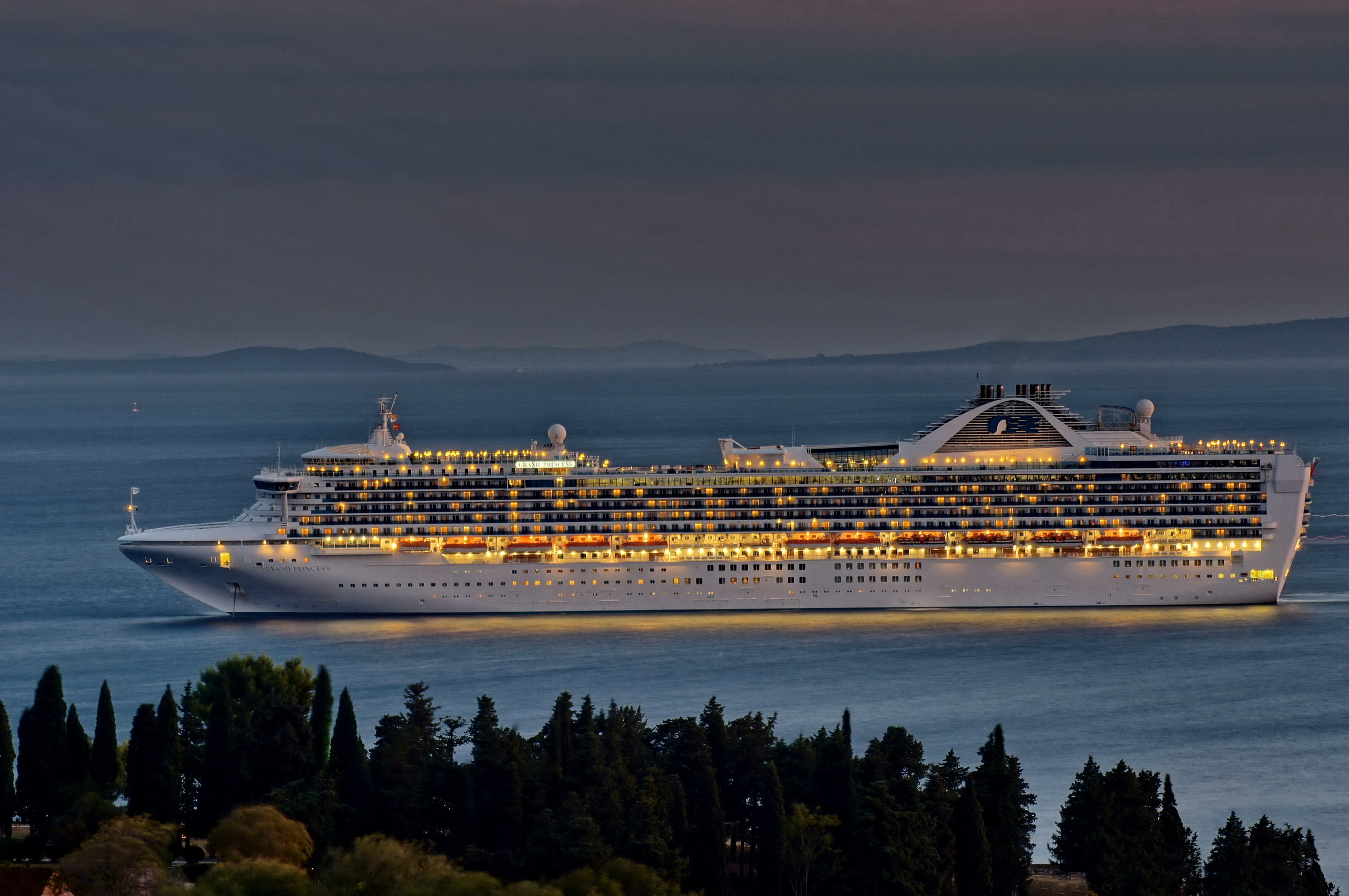
- Grand Princess in Split, Croatia in October 2011
- Disease: COVID-19
- Pathogen: SARS-CoV-2
- Location: Pacific Ocean
- First outbreak: Wuhan, Hubei, China
- Index case: Grand Princess
- Arrival date: 6 March 2020 (6 years, 6 months and 28 days) (Note: Date first results of people still on board was reported)
- Confirmed cases: 122 (Note: This includes 103 passengers and 19 crew members. It is unclear if the 2 passengers listed in the second source have been included in the first source. In addition, this value does not include those who disembarked before the ship was rerouted.)
- Deaths: 7 (Note: see chart)

During the COVID-19 pandemic, former passengers of the cruise ship Grand Princess who had tested positive for SARS-CoV-2 were being linked to cruises they had taken on the ship while it traveled between California, Mexico, and Hawaii. After the first confirmed death on 4 March 2020, Grand Princess was rerouted to the San Francisco Bay Area, where it was anchored offshore while test kits were airlifted to the ship. Preliminary testing found 21 positive cases, and the ship later docked in Oakland on 9 March 2020, with over 3,000 people entering quarantine.

As of 28 April 2020, at least 122 people who were on Grand Princess when it was rerouted are known to have tested positive for the virus, and 7 people have died.

== Timeline ==
California National Guard's 129th Rescue Wing airlifting test kits to Grand Princess

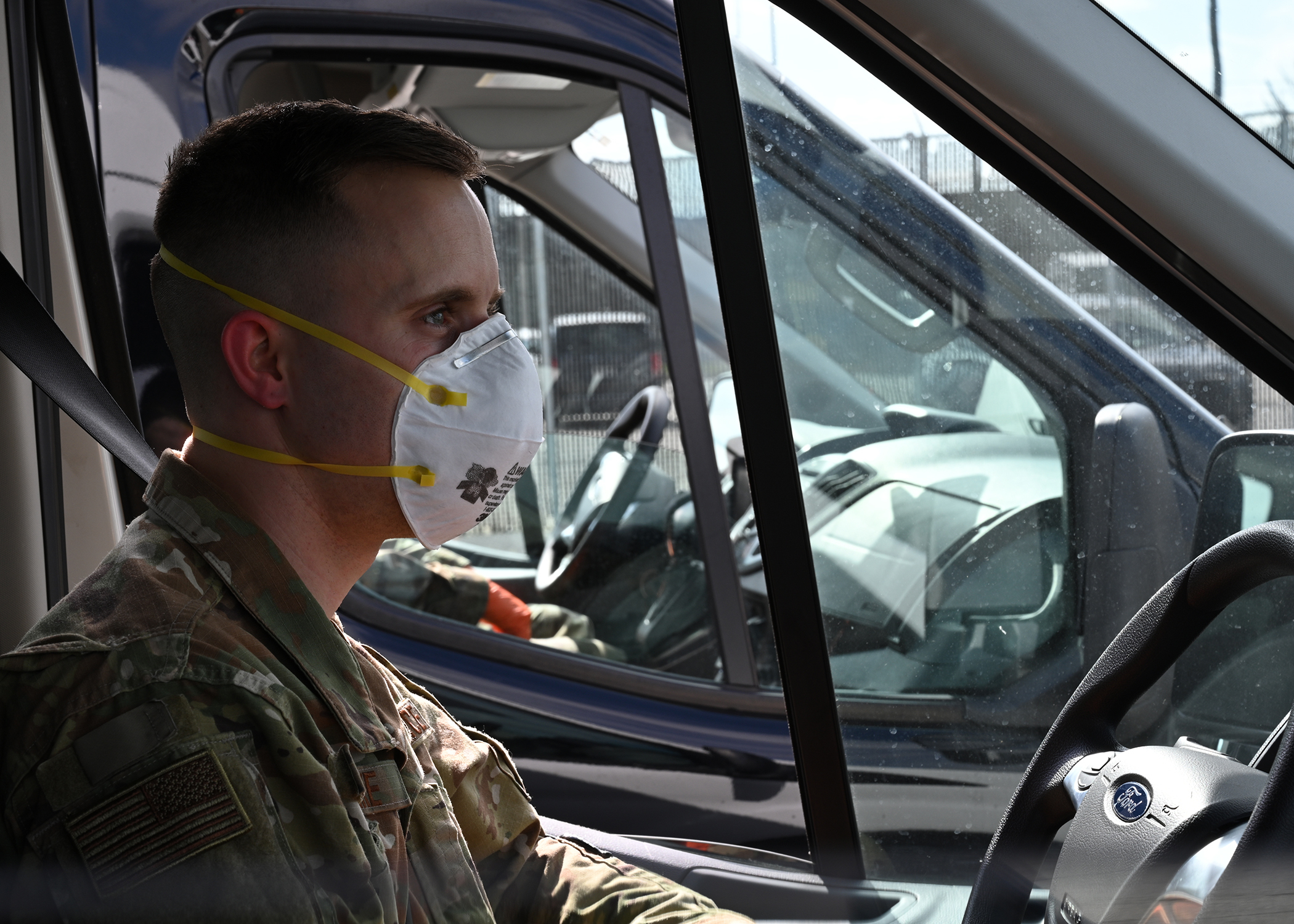
A member of the Maryland National Guard before transporting passengers from Grand Princess

On 4 March 2020, public health officials from Placer County, California reported that an elderly resident with underlying health conditions who had died earlier that day had tested positive for SARS-CoV-2 after returning from a cruise from San Francisco to Mexico and back on Grand Princess between 11 and 21 February. This marked the first death known at the time (Note: It would be discovered on 21 April 2020 that a 57-year-old woman from San Jose had died on 6 February 2020 from the virus.) in California attributable to the virus. The source of the new case's infection appeared to be the same as that of a resident of Sonoma County who tested positive on 2 March and who was also aboard Grand Princess on the same dates.

Consequently, Princess Cruises, the owner and operator of Grand Princess, working with the government of California, and public health officials in San Francisco, terminated a port call in Ensenada, Mexico planned for 5 March and returned to San Francisco over concerns about the potential for an outbreak on board.

After Grand Princess docked in San Francisco on 21 February, 62 passengers who had been on the previous cruise to Mexico reboarded the ship as it set sail for Hawaii, making stops at Kauai, Oahu, Maui, and Hilo (on the Big Island) between 26 and 29 February. These passengers, who may have made been exposed to the same environment as were the Placer or Sonoma County cases during the previous cruise, were quarantined in their own on-board staterooms on 4 March after delayed recommendation by CDC. In addition, eleven passengers and ten crew members were exhibiting potential symptoms, and Grand Princess was ordered by the government of California to remain offshore while the California National Guard's 129th Rescue Wing airlifted test kits by helicopter to the ship.

On 5 March, Princess Cruises confirmed that there were 3,533 people on board the ship—2,422 passengers and 1,111 crew members—representing 54 nationalities in total.

On 6 March, U.S. Vice President Mike Pence announced that of the 46 tests run on selected passengers and crew members on Grand Princess, 19 crew members and two passengers had tested positive, 24 had tested negative, and one test was inconclusive. Pence announced at a White House Coronavirus Task Force briefing that the ship would be brought to a non-commercial port, and that everyone on the ship would be tested and quarantined as necessary. On 6 March, President Trump said that, despite what experts told him about limiting the spread of the virus, he wanted those on board Grand Princess to stay on the ship so that they would not be counted as American cases, which would otherwise "double because of one ship that wasn't our fault."

On 7 March, Princess Cruises confirmed that Grand Princess was still at sea roughly 50 miles (80 km) from San Francisco, and that it was scheduled to dock in Oakland on 9 March, with its passengers to be transferred to facilities on land while the crew would be quarantined and treated on board. The United States Coast Guard had airlifted supplies, including personal protective equipment, to the ship, and had medivacked a critically ill passenger and his travel companion for treatment unrelated to the virus.

On 9 March, the ship docked at the Port of Oakland and passengers started disembarking. More than 3,000 people on board were to be quarantined, with passengers at land facilities and the crew on board. By 22:00 that evening, 407 people had disembarked, by 10 March, 1,406 people had disembarked, and by 12 March, 2,042 people had disembarked. On 16 March, Grand Princess undocked from the Port of Oakland and anchored in San Francisco Bay with 6 foreign passengers, 340 crew members, and 75 medical workers.

By 25 March, the Department of Health and Human Services (HHS) said that, of the 1,103 passengers who elected to be tested, 103 tested positive, 699 tested negative, and the remaining results were pending. Nearly two-thirds of the passengers quarantined at Travis Air Force Base refused to take the test, with some passengers stating that federal officials had discouraged them from doing so, and others admitting that they did not want to be tested because they wanted to be released from quarantine.

On 7 April, Grand Princess docked at Pier 35 in San Francisco for supplies before leaving San Francisco the next evening.

As of 20 April 2020, neither the CDC, nor the HHS appeared to have made any subsequent test results that they conducted public. In addition, some passengers complained about waiting for weeks without getting test results back from CDC and HHS, and some passengers have not been tested at all even though they showed symptoms upon disembarkation, despite Vice President Pence's earlier claim that all passengers would be tested.

== Itinerary ==
Date	Arrive	Depart	Location		Notes	Ref.
Date	Arrive	Depart	City/Region	Country	Notes	Ref.
2020.02.11	07:00	16:00	San Francisco	US	Begin 10-day Mexican Riviera cruise	
2020.02.15	08:00	20:00	Puerto Vallarta	Mexico		
2020.02.16	07:00	16:00	Manzanillo	Mexico		
2020.02.17	08:00	18:00	Mazatlán	Mexico		
2020.02.18	07:00	17:00	Cabo San Lucas	Mexico		
2020.02.21	07:00	16:00	San Francisco	US	Begin 15-day Hawaii cruise	
2020.02.26	08:00	17:00	Kauai (Note: The Princess Cruises brochure's illustration of the order that the islands are visited conflicts with that of the crew itinerary. However, after the ship had already made the stops, a local news source published an itinerary that conformed with the crew itinerary. In addition, the brochure has a disclaimer that the actual port order may vary.)	US		
2020.02.27	07:00	23:00	Honolulu	US		
2020.02.28	07:00	18:00	Maui	US		
2020.02.29	08:00	17:00	Hilo	US		
~~2020.03.05~~	~~16:00~~	~~20:00~~	~~Ensenada~~	~~Mexico~~		
~~2020.03.07~~	~~07:00~~	~~16:00~~	~~San Francisco~~	~~US~~	~~Begin another 15-day Hawaii cruise~~	
2020.03.05			near California	US		
2020.03.09			Oakland	US		

== Deaths ==
Date (Note: Date of announcement of death in italics if actual date of death was not reported)	Debarked (Note: '+' means "on or after")	Location of Death		Age	Gnd.	Pass. or Crew	Notes	Ref.
Date	Debarked	City/Region	Country	Age	Gnd.	Pass. or Crew	Notes	Ref.
2020.03.05	2020.02.21	Roseville (Note: Kaiser Permanente Roseville)	US	elder		Passenger	First death known at the time in California	
2020.03.20	2020.03.09+	Oakland	US	68	M	Passenger	From Crowley, TX; transferred from ship to hospital (Note: Decedent was a retired firefighter.)	
2020.03.21	2020.03.09+	California	US	60s (early)	M	Passenger	Transferred directly from ship to hospital	
2020.03.23	2020.03.09+	California	US	60s (early)	M	Passenger	At Travis Air Force Base before developing symptoms	
2020.03.26	2020.03.09	San Francisco (Note: California Pacific Medical Center)	US	74	M	Passenger	From Whitehall Township, Pennsylvania (Note: Decedent was a retired steel worker.)	
2020.03.27	2020.02.21	Marin County	US	70s	M	Passenger	First positive case and first death in Marin County	
2020.04.01	2020.03.09+ (Note: Crew members were quarantined on the ship after it docked in Oakland)	San Francisco (Note: in an unnamed hospital)	US			Crew	From the Philippines; transferred from ship to hospital	

A spokesperson from the Department of Health and Human Services stated that four passengers in quarantine died of the virus. The table above lists four passengers who disembarked after Grand Princess docked in Oakland, but as two of them were transferred directly from the ship to the hospital, it is unclear if the spokesperson had considered those two passengers to have been "in quarantine".

== Cases previously disembarked ==
Passengers who tested positive for the virus but had disembarked Grand Princess before the ship was rerouted to the San Francisco Bay Area were often reported separately from the passengers that eventually disembarked at Oakland.

=== 2 March ===
- California: The Sonoma County Department of Health confirmed that a former passenger of Grand Princess, on the cruise from San Francisco to Mexico, was a (presumptive) case.

=== 3 March ===
- California: Placer County officials confirmed that a former passenger of Grand Princess, also on the cruise from San Francisco to Mexico, was a (presumptive) case. Officials confirmed the next day that the passenger had died.

=== 5 March ===
- Canada: Alberta: Alberta reported its first presumptive case, a woman in her 50s who lives in the Calgary area, was on board Grand Princess and returned to Alberta on 21 February.
- United States:
  - California:
    - Placer County: Officials reported an additional three presumptive positive cases, with all three having travelled on the same cruise on the same dates.
    - Sonoma County: Health officials announced another positive presumptive case who was a passenger on the same cruise between 11 and 21 February.
    - Sunnyvale: Department of Public Safety officers reported that they performed CPR on an unconscious 72-year-old patient who was not breathing, but were ultimately unsuccessful in reviving him. After the man died, a family member informed officials that the victim had been a passenger on Grand Princess with two other people currently suspected of being infected. The passenger was later determined to be negative for the virus.
  - Nevada: The Washoe County Health District announced that a presumptive positive patient, a male in his 50s, has been linked to Grand Princess. He self-isolated at home. An elementary school in Reno was closed because one of the man's family members is a student there.

=== 6 March ===
- Canada: Ontario: Health officials confirmed that two new cases, a married man and woman in their 60s, were aboard Grand Princess from 11 to 21 February and returned to Canada on 28 February.
- United States:
  - California:
    - Alameda County: Officials confirmed that a former passenger of Grand Princess, an older patient with underlying health problems, has tested positive. The former passenger was on the ship during the trip to Mexico from 11 to 21 February 2020. The patient was hospitalised and family members were quarantined.
    - Contra Costa County: Health officials announced that two new cases have been identified, with both having traveled on the same cruise on the same dates.
    - Marin County: The health department announced that two Marin County residents who were on the cruise and displayed symptoms had also been tested, but Governor Gavin Newsom had prioritized the testing of the passengers who were on board Grand Princess, and all the tests were going through the same lab. On 2020.03.09, county officials announced that one of the passengers had tested positive, marking the first positive case in the county. On 2020.03.27, officials announced that the same passenger had died after being hospitalized for nearly three weeks, marking the first death attributable to the virus in the county.
  - Hawaii: Governor David Ige announced the state's first case, a male Oahu resident who was a passenger on Grand Princess. Although the ship stopped in Hawaii in late February, the man disembarked Grand Princess in Mexico earlier in February (before it returned in San Francisco on 21 February) and flew back home to Honolulu from Mexico.
  - Illinois: The Illinois and Chicago public-health departments announced that a former passenger of Grand Princess tested (presumptive) positive. The passenger, a woman in her 50s, had traveled on the same cruise to Mexico and disembarked at San Francisco on 21 February. She was hospitalized and isolated in stable condition. She is a special education assistant in the Chicago public school system, and the school where she worked was to be closed the following week, with all at-risk staff requested to self-quarantine for 14 days.
  - Utah: The Department of Health confirmed that the first (presumptive) case in Utah is a former passenger of Grand Princess living in Davis County.

=== 7 March ===
- Canada: British Columbia: Health officials announced that two cases are former passengers of Grand Princess. Both in their 60s, the two patients rode the ship to Mexico and back to California.
- United States: California: Fresno County: Officials confirmed that a former passenger of Grand Princess had tested positive. The former passenger was on the ship during the trip to Mexico from 11 to 21 February 2020. The family of the patient is reported to be self-monitoring.

== Lawsuits ==
At least a dozen lawsuits have been filed by passengers of Grand Princess against companies responsible for the cruise ship.

On 9 March 2020, a lawsuit was filed against Princess Cruise Lines by a Floridian couple that were passengers still aboard Grand Princess at the time. The lawsuit alleged that Princess Cruise Lines did not screen passengers appropriately for the virus prior to boarding (Note: Specifically, the couple stated that upon boarding, the only screening procedure they encountered was that they were "simply asked to fill out a piece of paper confirming they were not sick".) and that the cruise line did not warn passengers that symptoms of the virus had been observed on passengers of the previous voyage.

On 8 April 2020, a lawsuit was filed against Princess Cruise Lines, Fairline Shipping International Corporation, and Carnival Corporation by nine Northern Californians who were passengers of the Hawaii cruise. The lawsuit alleged that the defendants did not screen passengers appropriately, did not disinfect the ship properly, and did not quarantine passengers until around 5 March 2020. The lawsuit also alleged that the defendants did not inform passengers that coronavirus symptoms had been reported by passengers on the previous voyage, that passengers from the previous voyage who stayed aboard the ship for the Hawaii cruise had been exposed to the virus, and that a former passenger had died. One of the plaintiffs was infected by the virus and hospitalized at an ICU.

On 14 April 2020, a lawsuit was filed against Princess Cruise Lines by the widow of a retired Dallas firefighter who was a passenger that died of the virus. The lawsuit alleged that Princess Cruise Lines did not warn the couple that an outbreak on board the ship had sickened passengers during its previous voyage.

On 4 May 2020, a lawsuit was filed against Princess Cruise Lines and Carnival Corporation by the son of a retired Lehigh County steel worker who was a passenger that died of the virus. The lawsuit alleged that passengers were not informed that passengers on the previous voyage had exhibited symptoms consistent with the virus and that there were crew members aboard that had been exposed to the virus.

== See also ==
- COVID-19 pandemic on Diamond Princess
- COVID-19 pandemic on cruise ships
- COVID-19 pandemic on naval ships
- COVID-19 pandemic in California
- COVID-19 pandemic in Alberta
- COVID-19 pandemic in Hawaii
- COVID-19 pandemic in Utah
