= Timeline of the COVID-19 pandemic in the United States =

Timeline of the COVID-19 pandemic in the United States may refer to:

- Timeline of the COVID-19 pandemic in the United States (2020)
- Timeline of the COVID-19 pandemic in the United States (2021)
