= 2021 in Hawaii =

- Decades: 2000s; 2010s; 2020s
- See also: History of Hawaii; Historical outline of Hawaii; List of years in Hawaii; 2021 in the United States

The following is a list of events of the year 2021 in Hawaii.

== Incumbents ==
- Governor: David Ige (D)
- Lieutenant Governor: Josh Green (D)

== Events ==
Ongoing – COVID-19 pandemic in Hawaii

- January 31 – Shirlene Ostrov resigns as chairwoman of the Hawaii Republican Party following a series of tweets posted by vice chairman Edwin Boyette on the party's Twitter account defending people who supported the QAnon conspiracy theory. Additionally, Boyette resigned on January 24 after the tweets were posted the day before.
- March 8 – Hawaii reports their first case of the COVID-19 501.V2 variant that originated in South Africa in a person from Oahu with no known travel history.
- May 13 – Governor David Ige says that the state will keep its mask mandate despite the Centers for Disease Control and Prevention saying that fully vaccinated Americans can go to places without wearing a mask.
- June 14 – Hawaii reports their first case of the Lineage B.1.617 Delta variant in an Oahu resident who traveled to Nevada.
- July 2 – Transair Flight 810 experienced an engine failure shortly after takeoff from Honolulu's Daniel K. Inouye International Airport and attempted to return to the airport but was unable to maintain altitude and ditched into the ocean approximately 2 miles off the coast around 1:30 a.m.
- September 8 – The Alohilani Resort in Honolulu will require COVID-19 vaccinations for workers, becoming the first resort hotel in Hawaii to do so. The mandate will take effect on October 15.
- October 23 – Scientists at the University of Hawaiʻi at Mānoa announce the discovery of 2M0437b, one of the youngest exoplanets ever found at a distant star. The exoplanet was discovered using the Subaru Telescope at the observatory on Mauna Kea.
- November 29 – Red Hill water crisis: The Hawaii Department of Health issues an advisory to stop using water from a U.S. Navy-operated water system that serves Joint Base Pearl Harbor–Hickam and adjacent areas due to petroleum contamination.

== Deaths ==
- January 26 – Billy Kenoi, 52, American politician, mayor of Hawaii County (2008–2016)
- February 4 – William Bains-Jordan, 104, American politician, member of the Hawaii House of Representatives (1959–1962)
- February 20 – Dean Ho, 88, American professional wrestler (WWWF, PNW, NWA Hawaii), complications from chronic traumatic encephalopathy
- July 3 – Haunani-Kay Trask, 71, American Hawaiian nationalist and author
- July 12 – Bob Nakata, 80, American politician, member of the Hawaii House of Representatives (1983–1987) and Senate (1999–2003)
