= 2024 in Hawaii =

- Decades: 2000s; 2010s; 2020s
- See also: History of Hawaii; Historical outline of Hawaii; List of years in Hawaii; 2024 in the United States

Events from 2024 in Hawaii.

== Incumbents ==
- Governor: Josh Green
- Lieutenant Governor: Sylvia Luke

== Events ==
Ongoing – Red Hill water crisis

- April 16 – A private aircraft makes an emergency landing at Kapiʻolani Park. No one is injured in the incident.
- August 10 – 2024 Honolulu mayoral election: Incumbent Rick Blangiardi is re-elected to a second term.
- November 5 –
  - 2024 United States presidential election in Hawaii
  - 2024 United States Senate election in Hawaii
  - 2024 United States House of Representatives elections in Hawaii
  - 2024 Hawaii Senate election
  - 2024 Hawaii House of Representatives election
- December 17 – A Kamaka Air Cessna 208 Caravan on a training flight crashes shortly after taking off from Daniel K. Inouye International Airport in Honolulu, killing the two crew members onboard.
- December 22 – The 11th edition of The Eddie Aikau Big Wave Invitational surfing competition is held at Waimea Bay, and is won by Landon McNamara.
- December 24 – 2024 Hawaii Bowl: The South Florida Bulls defeat the San Jose State Spartans 41–39 after five overtimes.

== Holidays ==
- January 1 - New Year's Day
- January 15 - Martin Luther King Jr. Day
- February 19 - Presidents' Day
- March 26 - Prince Kūhiō Day
- March 29 - Good Friday
- May 27 - Memorial Day
- June 11 – Kamehameha Day
- July 4 - Independence Day
- August 21 – Statehood Day
- September 2 - Labor Day
- November 5 – Election Day
- November 11 - Veterans Day
- November 28 - Thanksgiving
- December 25 - Christmas Day
