= 2026 in Hawaii =

- Decades: 2000s; 2010s; 2020s
- See also: History of Hawaii; Historical outline of Hawaii; List of years in Hawaii; 2026 in the United States

Events from 2026 in Hawaiʻi.

== Incumbents ==
- Governor: Josh Green
- Lieutenant Governor: Sylvia Luke

== Events ==
- January 23 – Federal officials grant a request to extend housing assistance to survivors of the 2023 Hawaiʻi wildfires until February 2027.
- March 21 – 230 people are rescued, ten of whom are hospitalized for hypothermia, during floods and storms. Around 5,500 people are evacuated ahead of a second storm.
- March 25 – The city of Honolulu agrees to pay $975,000 in a settlement to a homeless man who was forcibly institutionalized for two years after being mistaken for another man with an arrest warrant.
- March 27 – Three people are killed in a helicopter crash at Kalalau Beach on Kauaʻi.
- April 22 – Hawaiian Airlines officially joins the Oneworld member alliance.
- April 23 – Lieutenant Governor Sylvia Luke announces she is taking an indefinite unpaid leave of absence amid a bribery investigation.
- May 5 – A 38-year-old tourist from Covington, Washington is filmed throwing a rock at a Hawaiian monk seal near Lahaina. He is arrested by federal authorities on May 13 and charged with criminal violations of the Endangered Species Act and Marine Mammal Protection Act.
- May 11 – The Hawaiʻi Rainbow Warriors beat the UC Irvine Anteaters 3–1 to win the 2026 NCAA men's volleyball tournament.
- May 22 – A M_{w} 6.0 earthquake occurs near Hōnaunau-Nāpōʻopoʻo on Hawaiʻi Island, and is felt as far away as Oʻahu and Kauaʻi. 18 homes were destroyed and 104 homes sustained major damage.
- May 25–26 – Three elderly men, two aged 69 and one aged 79, are killed in three separate attacks within a span of 26 hours across Hawaiʻi Island, sparking an island-wide manhunt for the suspect, who is arrested on May 28.
- June 25 – The U.S. Supreme Court rules in Wolford v. Lopez that a Hawaiʻi state law requiring people to get permission from business owners to bring firearms into their publicly-accessible property is unconstitutional.
- July 8 – Governor Josh Green signs House Bill 1969, introduced by Rep. Cory Chun, to expand screenings for colorectal cancer.
- July 24 – The state Attorney General indicts Lieutenant Governor Sylvia Luke, former state Representative Ryan Yamane, and three other individuals on corruption charges.
- August 15 – Hurricane Lala passes by the southern tip of Hawai‘i without making landfall. Two people are killed.
- September 3 – The National Fish and Wildlife Foundation announces $1.2 million in grants to reduce extinction risk for Hawaiian forest birds and restore essential watershed habitats in the state.
- September 5 – In high school football, Lahainaluna High School and Paradise High School host a football game known as the Unity Bowl in Maui to bring both communities together. Both communities were devastated by the Camp Fire in 2023 and 2023 wildfires respectively.
- September 8 – Hurricane Lowell hits Hawaii. Two people are killed, one in Kauaʻi and one in Oʻahu.
- November 3
  - 2026 United States House of Representatives elections in Hawaiʻi
  - 2026 Hawaiʻi gubernatorial election: Josh Green wins reelection, beating Republican challenger Gary Cordery.
  - 2026 Hawaiʻi Senate election
  - 2026 Hawaiʻi House of Representatives election

== Deaths ==
- March 5 – Colleen Hanabusa, 74, U.S. representative (2011–2015, 2016–2019) and president of the Hawaiʻi Senate (2009–2010)
- April 19 – George Ariyoshi, 100, Governor of Hawaiʻi (1974–1986) and first U.S. governor of Asian-American descent (b. 1926)

== Holidays ==
- January 1 – New Year's Day
- January 19 – Martin Luther King Jr. Day
- February 16 – Presidents' Day
- March 26 – Prince Kūhiō Day
- April 3 – Good Friday
- May 25 – Memorial Day
- June 11 – Kamehameha Day
- July 4 – Independence Day
- August 15 – Statehood Day
- September 7 – Labor Day
- September 1 – Labor Day
- November 3 – General Election Day
- November 26 – Thanksgiving
- December 25 – Christmas Day
