= 2017 in Hawaii =

- Decades: 1990s; 2000s; 2010s; 2020s
- See also: History of Hawaii; Historical outline of Hawaii; List of years in Hawaii; 2017 in the United States

Events from 2017 in Hawaii.

== Incumbents ==
- Governor: David Ige
- Lieutenant Governor: Shan Tsutsui

== Events ==
Ongoing – Puʻu ʻŌʻō eruption

- April 5 – Peter Kema Sr. pleads guilty to manslaughter in the death of his son "Peter Boy" Kema, who disappeared in 1997.
- July 14 – Marco Polo condo fire: A fire at the Marco Polo condominium building in Honolulu kills four residents.
- August 28 – The Hawaii State Legislature convenes a special session to consider additional funding for the Honolulu Rail Transit Project. A bill authorizing additional tax funding for the project is signed into law by Governor David Ige on September 5.
- November 11 – Island Air shuts down after 37 years of business.
- December 24 – 2017 Hawaii Bowl: The Fresno State Bulldogs defeat the Houston Cougars 33–27.
