= 2023 in Hawaii =

- Decades: 2000s; 2010s; 2020s
- See also: History of Hawaii; Historical outline of Hawaii; List of years in Hawaii; 2023 in the United States

Events from 2023 in Hawaii.

== Incumbents ==
- Governor: Josh Green
- Lieutenant Governor: Sylvia Luke

== Events ==
Ongoing – Red Hill water crisis

- January 22 – The tenth edition of The Eddie Aikau Big Wave Invitational surfing competition is held at Waimea Bay, and is won by Waimea Bay lifeguard Luke Shepardson.
- June 30 – The first segment of the Skyline rail transit service is inaugurated on Oʻahu.
- August 8 – The town of Lāhainā on Maui is destroyed in the 2023 Hawaii wildfires.
- August 9 –
  - Parts of western and upcountry Maui island in Hawaii, United States, are evacuated as wildfires cause power outages and disruption to emergency services in western Maui and other parts of Hawaii including Oahu and the Big Island, with at least six people being killed.
  - A large part of the historic Lahaina town, including the Waiola Church and the Lahaina Hongwanji Mission Temple, is destroyed by the wildfires.
- August 10 – 2023 Hawaii wildfires: The death toll from the wildfires in Hawaii increases to 36, all from the city of Lahaina.
- August 11 –
  - Authorities in Hawaii, call the Lahaina fire the "worst natural disaster in the state's history", as the death toll increases to 80 people, and 11,000 homes and businesses continue to be without electricity.
  - The Maria Lanakila Catholic Church is reportedly still standing despite the wildfires. The banyan tree is also standing, but is damaged by the wildfire and it is unknown if it will survive.
  - President Joe Biden orders the provision of federal aid to supplement state and local recovery efforts.
- August 12 – The death toll from the wildfires in Maui, Hawaii, United States, increases to 89, making it the deadliest wildfire in state history.
- August 13 –
  - Maui County officials announce that more than 93 people have died in the wildfires in Lahaina, Maui, Hawaii, making it the deadliest American wildfire since 1918, surpassing the death toll of the 2018 Camp Fire in California.
  - Hawaii Governor Josh Green says that the Banyan tree in Lahaina was damaged by the wildfires, but has survived.
- August 14 –
  - Shares in Hawaiian Electric Industries drop 30% after the company was sued for refusing to shut down power lines. Lawsuits are also filed against three other power companies that oversee the state.
  - The wildfires in Maui, Hawaii, United States, are ranked as the fifth deadliest wildfire in American history.
- August 15 – U.S. President Joe Biden and First Lady Jill Biden announces that they plan to visit Maui, Hawaii in an effort to help the island recover from the wildfires. This comes amidst criticism over his response to the wildfires including his "no comment" remarks.
- August 16 – The Lahaina Bypass reopens to traffic in west Maui, Hawaii after closing for a week due to the wildfires.
- September 8 – Hawaii state officials say that they plan to reopen the western area of Maui on October 8 from northward Kaanapali.
- September 19 – It is reported that the Lahaina Banyan Tree in Lahaina has shown signs of new life a month after wildfires decimated most of Maui.
- October 8 – The western area of Maui, located north of Kaanapali, reopens for tourism two months after wildfires damaged the area.

== Deaths ==
- May 21 – Sam Slom, 81, member of the Hawaiʻi Senate (1996–2016)
