= 2025 in Hawaii =

- Decades: 2000s; 2010s; 2020s
- See also: History of Hawaii; Historical outline of Hawaii; List of years in Hawaii; 2025 in the United States

Events from 2025 in Hawaii.

== Incumbents ==
- Governor: Josh Green
- Lieutenant Governor: Sylvia Luke

== Events ==
- January 1 – A fireworks explosion shortly after midnight in the Āliamanu neighborhood on Oʻahu kills four people initially with over 20 others hospitalized for serious injuries. Six individuals were later airlifted to Arizona for treatment due to a lack of space in the state's only burn unit. Two individuals later died of their injuries, bringing the death total to six.
- January 6 – A structure fire in the McCully neighborhood of Honolulu kills a responding firefighter of the Honolulu Fire Department. The fire was caused by unattended cooking in a kitchen.
- February 20 – An explosion at a resort in Kāʻanapali on Maui injures seven people, two of whom are transported to Oʻahu for treatment.
- March 31 – Gene Ward resigns from the Hawaiʻi House of Representatives due to health issues. He dies four days later. Joe Gedeon is appointed by Gov. Josh Green on May 28 to fill the vacancy created by Ward's resignation.
- July 29 – 2025 Kamchatka earthquake: A tsunami warning triggers evacuations across the entire state, with the first waves expected to arrive at approximately 7:10 PM Hawaiʻi time. The tsunami warning is later downgraded to an advisory, and cancelled the following morning. Property damage caused by the tsunami was minor.
- August 15 – Maui Police Officer Suzanne O is shot and killed while responding to a call. Her killer is convicted of murder after a jury trial in October 2026.
- September 13 – A tribute concert in memory of singer-songwriter Fiji held at the Waikiki Shell draws 28,500 people including overflow attendees in Kapiʻolani Park.
- September 30 – A Hele-On bus rolls over in Laupāhoehoe on Hawaiʻi Island, causing injuries to all 22 passengers onboard and closing Māmalahoa Highway for several hours.
- October 5 – A Rainbow Tours helicopter makes a precautionary landing in Kapiʻolani Park. No one was injured, and the helicopter departed the park about six hours later without incident.
- October 15 – The Falls of Clyde, a tall ship launched in 1878, is towed to sea from Honolulu Harbor and scuttled, after a decade of efforts to conserve the ship.
- October 16 – The second phase of Skyline in Honolulu opens for service.
- October 29 – A fire at a residential care home in ʻEwa Beach on Oʻahu kills two people.
- November 29 – A fire at a former poi factory converted into an apartment building in Hilo kills two people. A second fire the following day destroys four buildings in downtown Hilo.
- November 30 — Henry Aquino resigns from the Hawaiʻi Senate to accept a job with a lobbying firm. Rachele Lamosao is appointed by Gov. Josh Green to fill the vacancy created by Aquino's resignation on December 3; since Lamosao was a member of the Hawaiʻi House of Representatives, her appointment creates another vacancy. Daisy Hartsfield is appointed by Gov. Green to fill the vacancy created by Lamosao's appointment on January 12, 2026.
- December 24 – 2025 Hawaii Bowl: The Hawaiʻi Rainbow Warriors defeat the California Golden Bears by 35–31.

== Deaths ==
- April 4 – Gene Ward, 82, member of the Hawaiʻi House of Representatives (1990–1998, 2006–2025)
- July 23 – George Veikoso, 55, singer-songwriter known as Fiji

== Holidays ==
- January 1 – New Year's Day
- January 20 – Martin Luther King Jr. Day
- February 17 – Presidents' Day
- March 26 – Prince Kūhiō Day
- April 18 – Good Friday
- May 26 – Memorial Day
- June 11 – Kamehameha Day
- July 4 – Independence Day
- August 15 – Statehood Day
- September 1 – Labor Day
- November 11 – Veterans Day
- November 27 – Thanksgiving
- December 25 – Christmas Day
