= 2022 in Hawaii =

- Decades: 2000s; 2010s; 2020s
- See also: History of Hawaii; Historical outline of Hawaii; List of years in Hawaii; 2022 in the United States

Events from 2022 in Hawaii.

== Incumbents ==
- Governor: David Ige (until December 5), Josh Green (starting December 5)
- Lieutenant Governor: Josh Green (until December 5), Sylvia Luke (starting December 5)

== Events ==
Ongoing – COVID-19 pandemic in Hawaii; Red Hill water crisis

- June 5 – Hawaii reports a probable case of monkeypox in a person from Oahu, becoming the first island region of the United States to report a case.
- November 8 –
  - 2022 Hawaii House of Representatives election
  - 2022 Hawaii Senate election
  - 2022 Hawaii gubernatorial election
  - 2022 United States House of Representatives elections in Hawaii
  - 2022 United States Senate election in Hawaii
- November 27 – Mauna Loa on Hawaii Island erupts for the first time since 1984. The eruption causes no injuries or fatalities and minimal property damage, and ends on December 13.

== Deaths ==
- January 23 – Ezra Kanoho, 94, American politician, member of the Hawaii House of Representatives (1987–2006)
