= 2020 in Hawaii =

- Decades: 2000s; 2010s; 2020s
- See also: History of Hawaii; Historical outline of Hawaii; List of years in Hawaii; 2020 in the United States

Events from 2020 in Hawaii.

== Incumbents ==
- Governor: David Ige
- Lieutenant Governor: Josh Green

== Events ==
Ongoing – COVID-19 pandemic in Hawaii

- January 19 – A man facing eviction shoots three police officers, killing two, then sets a house on fire, which spreads to four nearby houses, in Honolulu, Hawaii, United States. He is presumed dead in the fire.
- March 6 – The first presumptive positive case of COVID-19 was confirmed in a Grand Princess passenger who had returned to the state.
- March 19 – The wreckage of the submarine USS Stickleback is discovered off the island of Oahu.
- August 2 – A Thai military spokesman says that plans to undertake joint military exercises with the U.S. military have been suspended after nine Thai soldiers who returned from Hawaii tested positive for COVID-19.
- September 5 – Hawaii County closes their beaches and shoreline parks through September 19 in an effort to stop the spread of COVID-19.
- October 15 – Hawaii is expected to reopen tourism to the public and lift the statewide mandatory quarantine for travellers who test negative. However, visitors will be required to wear masks and go through temperature screenings.
- December 21 – The Kīlauea volcano on Hawaii erupts, prompting the Hawaii County Civil Defense Agency to urge residents to stay indoors. The eruption followed a series of small earthquakes. A previous eruption in May 2018 destroyed hundreds of homes.

== Deaths ==
- April 12 – Dennis Yamada, 75, American politician, member of the Hawaii House of Representatives (1971–1983).
- May 18 – Willie K, 59, American singer and ukulele player.
- June 18 – Breene Harimoto, 66, American politician, member of the Hawaii Senate (since 2015)
