= 2016 in Hawaii =

- Decades: 1990s; 2000s; 2010s; 2020s
- See also: History of Hawaii; Historical outline of Hawaii; List of years in Hawaii; 2016 in the United States

Events from 2016 in Hawaii.

== Incumbents ==
- Governor: David Ige
- Lieutenant Governor: Shan Tsutsui

== Events ==
Ongoing – Puʻu ʻŌʻō eruption

- January 14 – 2016 United States Marine Corps helicopter collision: Two Sikorsky CH-53E Super Stallion helicopters collide mid-air during a training flight off the North Shore of Oʻahu, killing 12 U.S. Marines.
- February 25 – The ninth edition of The Eddie Aikau Big Wave Invitational surfing tournament is held at Waimea Bay, and is won by John John Florence.
- July 1 – The Hawaii Department of Health issues a public advisory about an outbreak of hepatitis A. The source of the outbreak is traced in August to contaminated scallops served at Genki Sushi restaurants on Oʻahu and Kauaʻi. 292 people are sickened by the end of the outbreak in October.
- July 23 – Tropical Storm Darby makes landfall on Hawaii Island. Darby is the second tropical storm to make landfall on Hawaii Island in three years, after Tropical Storm Iselle in August 2014.
- November 1 – Hawaii County mayor Billy Kenoi is acquitted of criminal charges related to misuse of his county-issued purchasing card after a jury trial.
- November 8 –
  - 2016 United States presidential election in Hawaii
  - 2016 United States Senate election in Hawaii
  - 2016 United States House of Representatives elections in Hawaii
  - 2016 Hawaii Senate election
  - 2016 Hawaii House of Representatives election
- December 24 – 2016 Hawaii Bowl: The Hawaii Rainbow Warriors defeat the Middle Tennessee Blue Raiders 52–35.
- December 27 – U.S. president Barack Obama and Japanese prime minister Shinzo Abe meet at the USS Arizona Memorial in Pearl Harbor. Abe is the first sitting prime minister of Japan to visit the memorial since it opened in 1962.
- December 30 – A Cessna 172 goes missing off Molokaʻi. The aircraft is not found after a three-day search, and the three people on board are presumed dead.

== Deaths ==
- July 20 – Mark Takai, 49, member of the U.S. House of Representatives for HI-01 (2015–2016)
- November 15 – Clift Tsuji, 75, member of the Hawaii House of Representatives (2004–2016)
