= 2015 in Hawaii =

- Decades: 1990s; 2000s; 2010s; 2020s
- See also: History of Hawaii; Historical outline of Hawaii; List of years in Hawaii; 2015 in the United States

Events from 2015 in Hawaii.

== Incumbents ==
- Governor: David Ige
- Lieutenant Governor: Shan Tsutsui

== Events ==
Ongoing – Puʻu ʻŌʻō eruption

- April 2 – 31 people are arrested on Mauna Kea on Hawaii Island while protesting construction of the Thirty Meter Telescope.
- December 24 – 2015 Hawaii Bowl: The San Diego State Aztecs defeat the Cincinnati Bearcats 42–7.
