= 2013 in Hawaii =

- Decades: 1990s; 2000s; 2010s; 2020s
- See also: History of Hawaii; Historical outline of Hawaii; List of years in Hawaii; 2013 in the United States

Events from 2013 in Hawaiʻi.

== Incumbents ==
- Governor: Neil Abercrombie
- Lieutenant Governor: Shan Tsutsui

== Events ==
Ongoing – Puʻu ʻŌʻō eruption

- July 27 – Tropical Storm Flossie: A tropical storm warning is issued for Hawaiʻi and Maui counties. Tropical storm warnings for the rest of the state are issued on July 29. Flossie causes only minor damage as it passes by the Hawaiian Islands before dissipating.
- September 9 – Honolulu molasses spill: Matson workers discover a major spill of 1,400 tons (1,300 t) of molasses at their company's facilities in Honolulu Harbor.
- October 28 – The Hawaiʻi State Legislature convenes a special session called by governor Neil Abercrombie to consider legislation to legalize same-sex marriage in Hawaiʻi. The Hawaiʻi Marriage Equality Act is passed by the Legislature on November 12, signed into law by Abercrombie on November 13, and goes into effect on December 2.
- December 24 – 2013 Hawaiʻi Bowl: The Boise State Broncos lose to the Oregon State Beavers 23–38.
