= Silene hawaiiensis =

Conservation status
- Imperiled (NatureServe)

Scientific classification
- Kingdom: Plantae
- Clade: Tracheophytes
- Clade: Angiosperms
- Clade: Eudicots
- Order: Caryophyllales
- Family: Caryophyllaceae
- Genus: Silene
- Species: S. hawaiiensis

Binomial name
- Silene hawaiiensis Sherff

Species of flowering plant

Silene hawaiiensis is a rare species of flowering plant in the family Caryophyllaceae known by the common names Hawai'i catchfly, Hawaiian catchfly and Sherff's catchfly. It is endemic to Hawaii, where it is known only from the island of Hawaii. It is threatened by habitat degradation and is federally listed as a threatened species in the United States.

== Description ==
This subshrub grows 15 to 40 centimeters tall and bears narrow leaves and greenish white flowers. The roots are spindle-shaped and sometimes grow exposed aboveground, which may help the plant survive.

== Distribution and habitat ==
This plant grows on the lava and ash substrates of the volcanoes of the island of Hawaii. It grows at Kīlauea, Mauna Loa, Mauna Kea, and Hualālai. It is a member of the sparse flora in the southwest rift zone of Kilauea, which includes such plants as Coprosma ernodeoides (pilo), Dubautia ciliolata (naenae), Leptecophylla tameiameiae (pukiawe), Metrosideros polymorpha (ʻōhiʻa lehua), Nephrolepis exaltata (nianiau, ikupukupu), Sadleria sp. (amau), and Vaccinium reticulatum (ōhelo ʻai). A recent estimate is a total of 22 populations containing 8360 individuals.

== Conservation ==
Silene hawaiiensis was listed as threatened under the Endangered Species Act on 4 March 1994. Threats to the plant include fire in some areas. Fire also fosters the takeover of invasive plant species such as Pennisetum setaceum (fountain grass), which displaces native plants; the flammable fountain grass then increases the likelihood of more fire. Construction and other activities at Mauna Kea and the Pohakuloa Training Area may threaten some plants. Introduced Mouflon sheep are a threat to this and other native plants. Insect damage and climate change may be threats as well.
