= 2018 in Hawaii =

- Decades: 1990s; 2000s; 2010s; 2020s
- See also: History of Hawaii; Historical outline of Hawaii; List of years in Hawaii; 2018 in the United States

Events from 2018 in Hawaiʻi.

== Incumbents ==
- Governor: David Ige
- Lieutenant Governor: Shan Tsutsui (until January 31), Doug Chin (from February 2 until December 3), Josh Green (from December 3)

== Events ==
- January 13 – 2018 Hawaiʻi false missile alert: An error during a drill at the Hawaiʻi Emergency Management Agency results in a ballistic missile warning being transmitted via the Emergency Alert System and Wireless Emergency Alerts, causing widespread panic.
- January 31 – Lieutenant governor Shan Tsutsui abruptly resigns to accept a job with a political strategy firm. Attorney general Doug Chin is named his successor after Senate President Ron Kouchi and House Speaker Scott Saiki decline to accept the position.
- February 13 – United Airlines Flight 1175: A United Airlines Boeing 777 en route from San Francisco International Airport to Daniel K. Inouye International Airport experiences a major engine failure about 120 miles (190 km) from Honolulu. The aircraft lands safely without any casualties.
- April 13 – 2018 Hawaiʻi floods: Heavy rainfall on the islands of Kauaʻi and Oʻahu causes widespread flash flooding and landslides, resulting in $125 million in property damage.
- May 3 –
  - 2018 lower Puna eruption: Kīlauea on Hawaiʻi Island begins erupting in the residential neighborhood of Leilani Estates. Over 700 homes are destroyed by the end of the eruption on September 5. The end of the eruption in Puna is also the first time in 35 years that Kīlauea is not erupting.
  - The City and County of Honolulu enacts new fire safety requirements for residential high-rise buildings, which were prompted by the Marco Polo condo fire in July 2017.
- August 22 – Hurricane Lane causes heavy rainfall and widespread flooding across the entire state, and contributed to a wildfire in Kauaula Valley on Maui.
- September 12 – Hurricane Olivia becomes the first named storm in recorded history to make landfall on the island of Maui.
- October 8 – 2,700 union members of UNITE HERE Local 5 employed at four hotels on Oʻahu and one hotel on Maui go on strike as part of the nationwide 2018 Marriott Hotels strike. The strike in Hawaiʻi ends after union members ratify a new contract on November 27.
- November 6 –
  - 2018 United States Senate election in Hawaiʻi
  - 2018 United States House of Representatives elections in Hawaiʻi
  - 2018 Hawaiʻi gubernatorial election
  - 2018 Hawaiʻi Senate election
  - 2018 Hawaiʻi House of Representatives election
- December 22 – 2018 Hawaiʻi Bowl: The Hawaiʻi Rainbow Warriors lose to the Louisiana Tech Bulldogs 14–31.
