= 2014 in Hawaii =

- Decades: 1990s; 2000s; 2010s; 2020s
- See also: History of Hawaii; Historical outline of Hawaii; List of years in Hawaii; 2014 in the United States

Events from 2014 in Hawaii.

== Incumbents ==
- Governor: Neil Abercrombie (until December 1); David Ige (from December 1)
- Lieutenant Governor: Shan Tsutsui

== Events ==
Ongoing – Puʻu ʻŌʻō eruption

- June 27 – New lava outbreaks from Puʻu ʻŌʻō flow northeast towards Pāhoa. The lava flows stop about 480 feet (150 m) from the main street in Pāhoa on October 30.
- August 8 – Tropical Storm Iselle makes landfall on Hawaii Island, causing $148 million in property damage. One hiker on Kauaʻi dies after being swept away by a flooded stream.
- August 9 – State senator David Ige defeats incumbent Neil Abercrombie in the Democratic primary election for governor.
- November 8 –
  - 2014 United States Senate special election in Hawaii
  - 2014 United States House of Representatives elections in Hawaii
  - 2014 Hawaii gubernatorial election
  - 2014 Hawaii Senate election
  - 2014 Hawaii House of Representatives election
- December 24 – 2014 Hawaii Bowl: The Fresno State Bulldogs lose to the Rice Owls 6–30.
