= Kūhiō =

Kūhiō may refer to:

- Kūhiō Kalanianaʻole, Hawaiian high chief of Hilo
- Jonah Kūhiō Kalanianaʻole, prince of the Kingdom of Hawaii
- Quentin Kūhiō Kawananakoa, American politician

== See also ==
- Prince Kūhiō Day
- The Wonderful World of Captain Kuhio
