= 1978 in Hawaii =

- Decades: 1950s; 1960s; 1970s; 1980s; 1990s
- See also: History of Hawaii; Historical outline of Hawaii; List of years in Hawaii; 1978 in the United States

Events from 1978 in Hawaii.

== Incumbents ==
- Governor: George Ariyoshi
- Lieutenant Governor: Nelson Doi (until December 2); Jean King (starting December 2)
- Senators:
  - Daniel Inouye
  - Spark Matsunaga
- US Representatives for Hawaii:
  - Cecil Heftel
  - Daniel Akaka

== Events ==
- July 5 – The 1978 Hawaii State Constitutional Convention is convened.
- November 7 – 1978 Hawaii gubernatorial election: George Ariyoshi is re-elected to a second term.
- November 7 – Voters approve numerous amendments proposed by the 1978 Hawaii State Constitutional Convention, including the establishment of the Office of Hawaiian Affairs, protections for Native Hawaiian traditional and customary rights, and the recognition of Hawaiian as an official state language.

== Births ==
- September 7 – Kuana Torres Kahele, Hawaiian musician, songwriter, and educator, born in Hilo.
