= 1959 in Hawaii =

- Decades: 1930s; 1940s; 1950s; 1960s; 1970s
- See also: History of Hawaii; Historical outline of Hawaii; List of years in Hawaii; 1959 in the United States

Events from 1959 in Hawaii.

== Incumbents ==
- Governor: William F. Quinn (R)
- Lieutenant Governor: James Kealoha

== Events ==
- August 1–8: Hurricane Dot (1959)
- August 21 –
  - The Territory of Hawaii is admitted to the union of the United States as the 50th State.
  - William F. Quinn is elected the first governor of the state of Hawaii.
