= 2019 in Hawaii =

- Decades: 1990s; 2000s; 2010s; 2020s
- See also: History of Hawaii; Historical outline of Hawaii; List of years in Hawaii; 2019 in the United States

Events from 2019 in Hawaii.

== Incumbents ==
- Governor: David Ige
- Lieutenant Governor: Josh Green

== Events ==
- March 17 – Southwest Airlines inaugurates service between the continental United States and Hawaii. Interisland service begins on April 28.
- April 29 – A Robinson R44 helicopter crashes onto a residential street in Kailua on Oʻahu, killing all three people on board.
- June 21 – A Beechcraft King Air operating a skydiving flight crashes on takeoff at Dillingham Airfield on Oʻahu, killing all 11 people on board.
- June 27 – Former Honolulu Police Department chief Louis Kealoha and former prosecutor Katherine Kealoha are convicted on federal charges of conspiracy and obstruction of justice.
- July 17 – 33 people are arrested on Hawaii Island for blocking Mauna Kea Access Road during protests against the construction of the Thirty Meter Telescope.
- December 24 – 2019 Hawaii Bowl: The Hawaii Rainbow Warriors defeat the BYU Cougars 38–34. This is the last game for the Hawaii Rainbow Warriors with Nick Rolovich as head coach; he leaves in January 2020 to be head coach of the Washington State Cougars.
- December 26 – A Eurocopter AS350 operating a sightseeing flight crashes into a mountain on the west side of Kauaʻi, killing all seven people on board.
