= Hawaiian Legacy Reforestation Initiative =

Nonprofit founded in 2014

- Abbreviation: HLRI
- Formation: 2014; 12 years ago
- Founder: Jeffrey Dunster; Darrell Fox
- Type: Nonprofit
- Tax ID no.: 46-5002476
- Legal status: 501(c)(3)
- Purpose: reforest endemic trees and restore native habitat for wildlife in Hawaii
- Headquarters: Honolulu, Hawaii
- Location: United States
- Methods: sponsorships and partnerships
- Board Chair: Francis Wong
- Executive Director: Jeffrey Dunster
- Website: https://legacyforest.org/

The Hawaiian Legacy Reforestation Initiative (HLRI) is a Hawaii-based 501(c)(3) nonprofit organization founded in 2014 that works to reforest endemic trees and restore native habitat for wildlife. This includes koa, ‘ōhi‘a, māmane, naio, ko‘oko‘olau, kūkaenēnē and ‘iliahi trees.

== History ==
HLRI is working to reforest 1.3 million endemic trees throughout Hawaii. To date, it has reforested more than 400,000 trees across 1,200 leased acres along the Hamakua Coast of Hawaii Island. In April 2017, HLRI expanded its Hawaii Island operations to a second location, at Kahua Ranch on the western slope of the Kohala Mountains, that will encompass 700 acres with 250,000 trees. HLRI is expanding operations to the North Shore of Oahu at Gunstock Ranch at Malaekahana.

Trees are planted through sponsorships and partnerships. Each tree is tagged with RFID chip and GPS technology, which track and verify health and growth characteristics.

In 2014, HLRI was one of four international organizations recognized with the Phoenix Award by the Society of American Travel Writers for its work in conservation, preservation, beautification and anti-pollution campaigns.

Multi-use agriculture components of the forest include Kona coffee farming and the harvesting of honey from koa tree blossoms.

The current executive director is Jeff Dunster, and the current chairman is John Farias Jr.
