= ʻAlohilani Resort Waikiki Beach =

Hotel in Honolulu, Hawaii

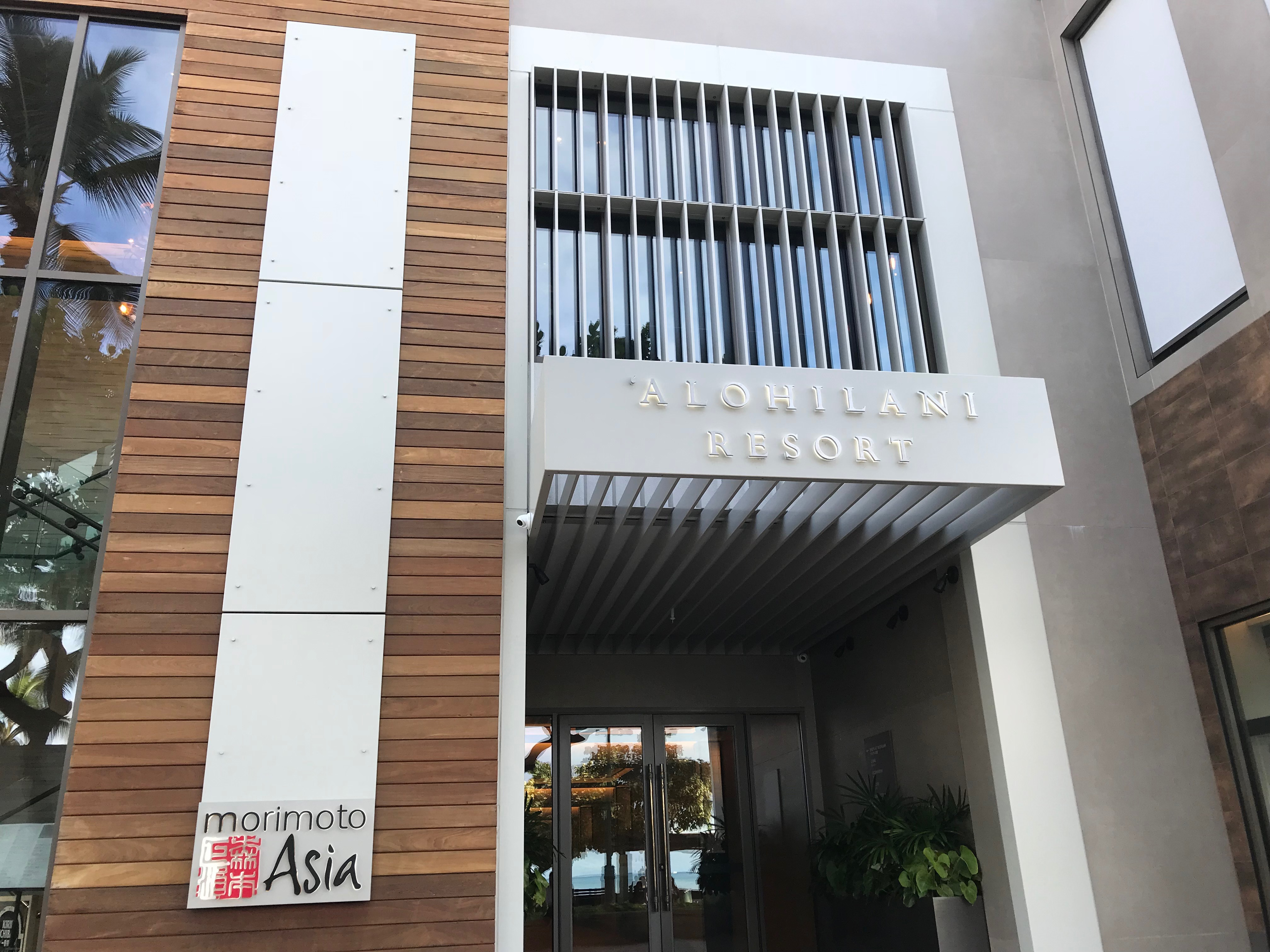
- Interactive map of the ʻAlohilani Resort Waikiki Beach area

General information
- Location: Waikiki, Honolulu, Hawai'i, 2490 Kalakaua Avenue
- Coordinates: 21°16′27.98″N 157°49′25.63″W
- Opening: May 8, 2018

Design and construction
- Architects: Rockwell Group; Wimberly Allison Tong & Goo; Pacific Asia Design Group

Other information
- Number of rooms: 839

Website
- https://www.alohilaniresort.com/

The ʻAlohilani Resort Waikiki Beach is a resort hotel located in Honolulu, Hawai'i on Waikīkī Beach. The 'Alohilani opened in 2018, having 839 guest rooms and suites, an infinity pool, a 280,000 gallon, 3-story high oceanarium and two restaurants by "Iron Chef" Masaharu Morimoto.

== History ==
Residing on land that belongs to Queen Liliʻuokalani's Trust and named after one of her beachside cottages, the property underwent a $125 million redevelopment, officially opening on May 8, 2018. 'Alohilani means "heavenly brightness" or "royal light". In September 2019, the Queen Liliuokalani Trust sold the land beneath the hotel for $195 million to Safehold Inc., a real estate investment trust affiliated with iStar Financial. On September 8, 2021, the hotel became the first in Hawaii to require COVID-19 vaccinations for workers, going into effect on October 15.

== Notable features ==
Two of the property's restaurants – Morimoto Asia Waikiki and Momosan Waikiki – are creations of Masaharu Morimoto, best known as an "Iron Chef" on the Japanese television cooking shows Iron Chef and its spinoff Iron Chef America.

The resort's lobby houses a 280,000 gallon, 3-story high oceanarium (saltwater aquarium) featuring more than 1,000 indigenous marine life and coral reef formations.

There is a heated saltwater infinity pool.

There are two full-size, rooftop tennis courts on property.

== Nonprofit initiative ==
'Alohilani has pledged to plant 100,000 native trees across O'ahu and the Big Island in partnership with Hawaiian Legacy Reforestation Initiative, a Hawaii-based nonprofit organization committed to returning indigenous trees back to Hawai'i.
