= 1984 in Hawaii =

- Decades: 1960s; 1970s; 1980s; 1990s; 2000s
- See also: History of Hawaii; Historical outline of Hawaii; List of years in Hawaii; 1984 in the United States

Events from 1984 in Hawaii.

== Incumbents ==
- Governor: George Ariyoshi
- Lieutenant Governor: John Waiheʻe

== Events ==
- March 25 – Mauna Loa on Hawaii Island erupts. The eruption ends on April 15.
- November 6 – 1984 United States presidential election in Hawaii
