= 2026 Hawaii County killings =

Triple homicide in Hawaii, US

- Coordinates of Puna, Hawaii
- Location: Puna, Hawaii, US
- Date: May 25–26, 2026
- Attack type: Slashing, strangling, homicide
- Deaths: 3
- Victims: Robert Shine (69); Chitta Morse (79); John Carse (69)
- Motive: Under investigation
- Accused: Jacob Daniel Baker
- Charges: Second-degree murder (x3); Burglary; Unauthorized control of a propelled vehicle; Unauthorized entry into a motor vehicle; Theft (x2); Criminal property damage

Between May 25 and 26, 2026, three elderly men, two aged 69 and one aged 79, were found dead in three separate attacks within a span of 26 hours across Puna, Hawaii, United States. Hawaii County Police confirmed that all three of the victims died separately; one of which died from slashing, one found drowning, and the other found dead nearly 20 miles away from unspecified trauma. Despite no motive being announced, officers from the Hawaii County Police Department were confident in a briefing that 36-year-old Jacob Daniel Baker was linked as the suspect in the killings. Baker was arrested by Hawaii County Police after a two-day manhunt.

== Background ==
On May 22, two women requested temporary restraining orders against Baker, alleging he had threatened and harassed them at filed by Josanna's Organic Garden, an organic farm on Papaya Farms Road in Pāhoa, that was co-owned by one of the women. However, the judge denied both applications, ruling that "there's not enough proof of harassment provided". One of the women claimed in her petition that Baker had threatened to kill people, including a disabled man, who were staying on the property and had caused a number of them to move or end their stays. One of the women included a video of Baker making threats. The other alleged in her petition that Baker had threatened people, and would trespass on the property, take things that didn't belong to him, and say his intention was to squat on the property. The women and the disabled man left the property shortly afterward.

== Murders ==
Within a span of 26 hours, officers from the Hawaii County Police Department confirmed three homicides. On May 25 at 8:47 p.m. HDT, officers were dispatched to the first victim, later identified as 69-year-old Robert Shine, found partially submerged in a catchment tank on Papaya Farms Road in Pāhoa. Nearly 17 hours later on May 26, officers dispatched to the same road at 12:39 p.m. HDT where they found 79-year-old Chitta Morse deceased from blunt force injuries nearly 500 yards away from the first report. Later that evening at 9:58 p.m. HDT, officers were dispatched nearly 20 miles away to Kalapana, where another 69-year-old man, later identified as John Carse, was found dead with a slash wound through his neck while conducting a welfare check at a property. Despite two of the victims previously lived closed to Baker, police confirmed that there was no known connection between the men.

== Suspect ==
Jacob Daniel Baker (born 1989), a Pāhoa resident, originally from Maui, had a total of 20 other cases in the court record in the past two decades, most of which were traffic infractions. Baker had previously faced criminal charges, including charges for letting a dog wander, failure to appear in court, trespassing, driving without a license, and driving under the influence. During the two-day manhunt, witnesses claimed to have seen Baker in nearby Leilani Estates and inside a 7-Eleven convenience store in Pāhoa. On May 28, Baker was spotted hiding in tall grass off Kalapana Kapoho Road in Puna District, ran to conceal himself in a narrow lava tube, and was apprehended by police and taken into custody.
