= Bob Nakata =

American politician (1941–2021)

The Reverend Bob Nakata

Member of the Hawaii Senate from the 23rd district
- In office 1998–2002
- Preceded by: Mike McCartney
- Succeeded by: Melodie Williams Aduja

Member of the Hawaii House of Representatives from the 15th district
- In office 1984–1986
- Preceded by: Ken Kiyabu
- Succeeded by: Reb Bellinger

Member of the Hawaii House of Representatives from the 43rd district
- In office 1982–1984
- Succeeded by: Arnold Morgado

Personal details
- Born: April 2, 1941 Honolulu, Hawaii
- Died: July 12, 2021 (aged 80) Honolulu, Hawaii
- Party: Democratic

Robert "Bob" Nakata (April 2, 1941 – July 12, 2021) was an American politician who served in the Hawaii House of Representatives from 1982 to 1986 and in the Hawaii Senate from 1998 to 2002.

He died on July 12, 2021, in Honolulu, Hawaii, at age 80.
