= Dennis Yamada =

American politician (1944–2020)

Member of the Hawaii House of Representatives from the 27th district
- In office January 15, 1975 – January 19, 1983
- Succeeded by: Dennis Nakasato

Member of the Hawaii House of Representatives from the 25th district
- In office January 20, 1971 – January 15, 1975
- Succeeded by: John J. Medeiros; Andy Poepoe

Personal details
- Born: August 20, 1944 Lihue, Hawaii
- Died: April 12, 2020 (aged 75) Honolulu, Hawaii
- Party: Democratic
- Other political affiliations: Republican (before 1974)

Dennis Roy Yamada (August 20, 1944 – April 12, 2020) was an American politician who served in the Hawaii House of Representatives from 1971 to 1983.

Yamada went to the University of Missouri and Drake University Law School. Yamada practiced law on Kauai. He died on Oahu, Hawaii on April 12, 2020, at age 75.
