= Marco Polo condo fire =

2017 condominium fire in Honolulu, Hawaii, U.S.

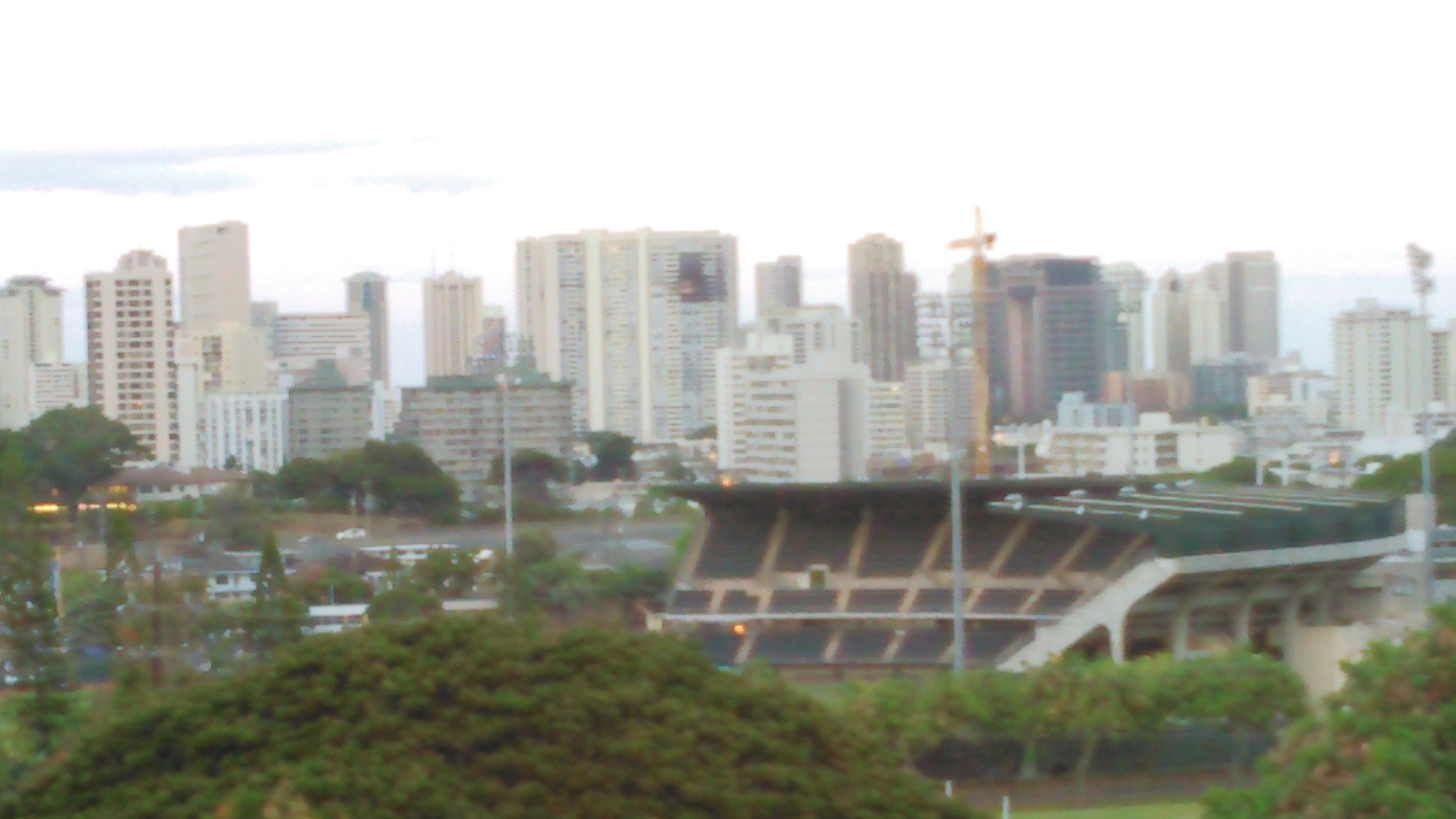
- Skyline of Honolulu seen from the University of Hawaii at Manoa with the Marco Polo in the middle scarred by the fire 1 month after the incident.
- Date: July 14, 2017
- Time: 2:17pm HST
- Location: Honolulu, Hawaii; 21°17′14.99″N 157°49′42.53″W
- Type: Structure fire
- Cause: Undetermined
- Deaths: 4
- Injuries: 13
- Property damage: Over $100 million

The Marco Polo condo fire was a high-rise fire that occurred at 2:17 p.m. on July 14, 2017, in the 36-story Marco Polo condominium building at 2333 Kapiolani Boulevard in the McCully-Mōʻiliʻili neighborhood of Honolulu, Hawaii. 4 people were killed, and 13 others (including 1 firefighter) were injured. Over 200 units were damaged or destroyed (Note: More than 80 units were damaged, 30 were destroyed, and over 130 sustained water damage.) giving the destruction of the building at more than $100 million. Additionally, concern about the abatement of asbestos, which was built into the Marco Polo structure, was under investigation by the state of Hawai'i's Department of Health and Department of Labor's workplace safety division.

== Building history ==
The Marco Polo was completed in 1971. A previous fire in 2013 caused $1.1 million in property damage to two apartments, but no injuries were reported.

== Fire ==
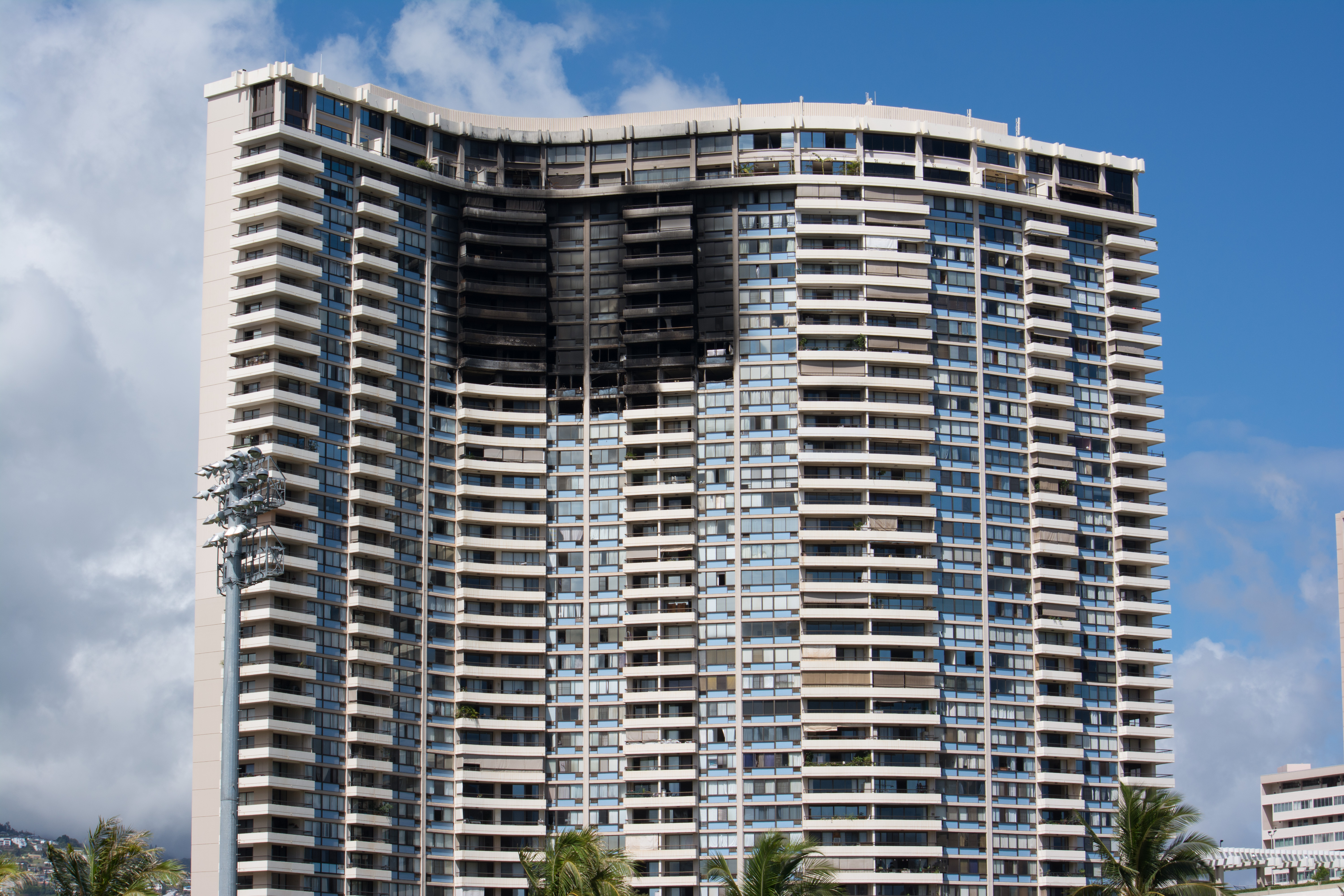
Marco Polo condo damage 3 days after the fire

Victims killed
Jean Dilley, 87
Joann M. Kuwata, 71
Britt Reller, 54
Marilyn Van Gieson, 81

A fire was initially reported at 2:17 p.m. on the 26th floor of the building, and spread across a dozen apartments on the 26th, 27th, and 28th floors. The bodies of three victims were found on the 26th floor. A fourth victim, who lived 6 floors above the origin of the blaze, had been hospitalized due to smoke inhalation, but died 20 days later on August 3. The 7-alarm fire required over 120 firefighters and 15 fire engines from the Honolulu Fire Department (HFD) to respond. Firefighters monitored the fire overnight. A shelter for displaced residents was established at ʻIolani School.

An investigation by HFD was unable to conclusively identify the cause of the fire.

== Aftermath ==
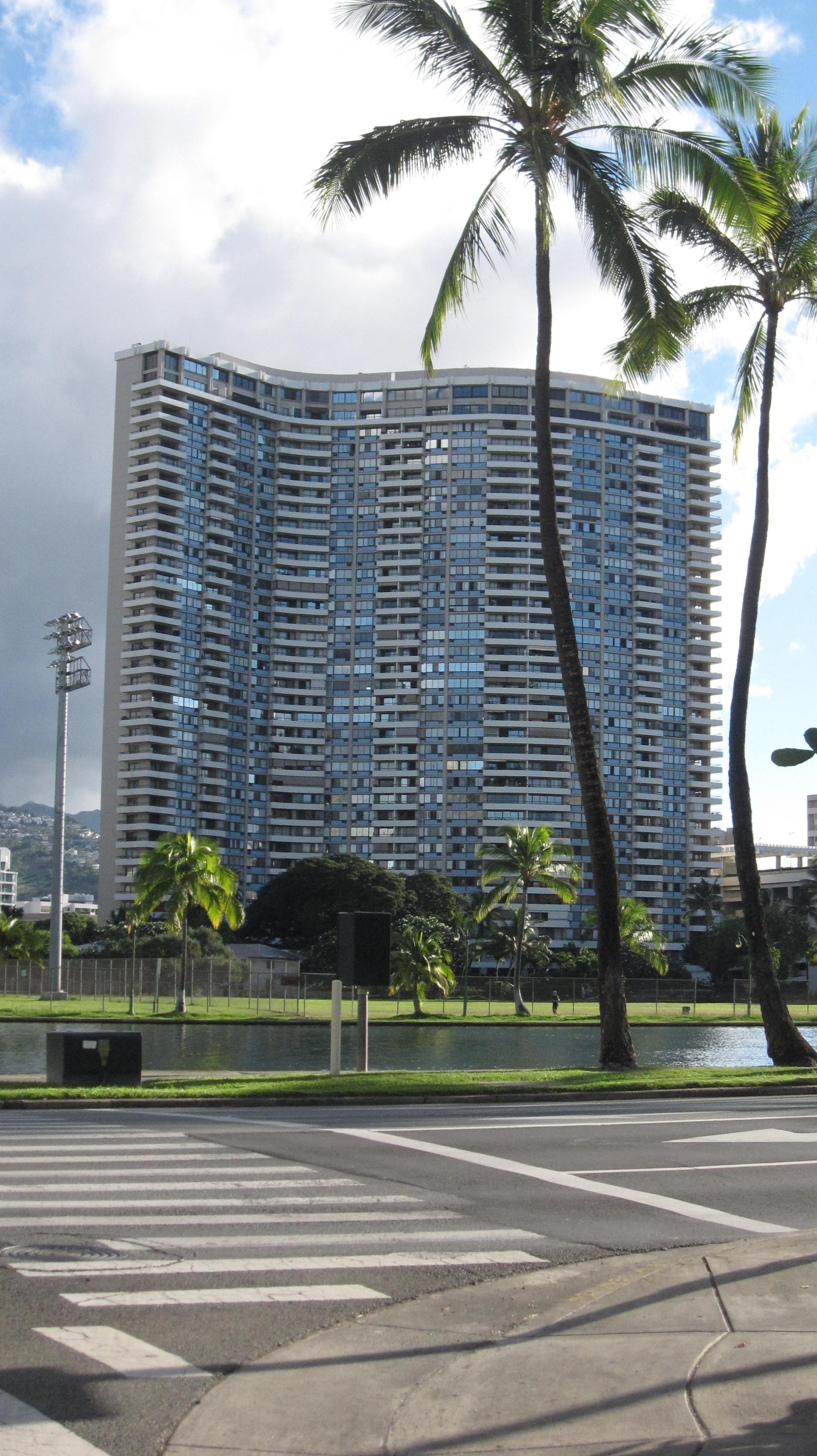
Marco Polo in 2021

More than 200 of the 568 units were damaged. No sprinkler system was installed in the Marco Polo building complex which was built in 1971 and four years before sprinklers became mandatory for new construction in Honolulu. In fact, after a 2013 fire, the Marco Polo building's association obtained an estimate of $8,000 per condo for installation of sprinklers. This would have cost $4.5 million for the entire complex, but the sprinkler system was never installed. More than 300 high-rises across Oahu are not required to have sprinklers. (Note: A high-rise is defined as a structure at least 35 metres (115 ft) or 12 stories tall and less than 100 metres (330 ft) or 40 stories tall. As of 2017, Honolulu is ranked 66th in the world with 457 high-rises.) However, local and Hawai'i lawmakers were considering making sprinklers mandatory on these older complexes. Both Honolulu Mayor Kirk Caldwell and Hawai'i state senator Glenn Wakai voiced support for sprinkler installation in older high-rises.

In response to the Marco Polo fire, the City and County of Honolulu enacted Ordinance 18–14 in May 2018, which requires all buildings ten stories or higher to conduct a safety evaluation and retrofit necessary improvements or retrofit automatic sprinklers. Out of 102 buildings that had conducted a safety evaluation by April 2021, only six had passed. Buildings are required to complete safety evaluations or sprinkler retrofits by the spring of 2024.

== See also ==
- First Interstate Tower fire
