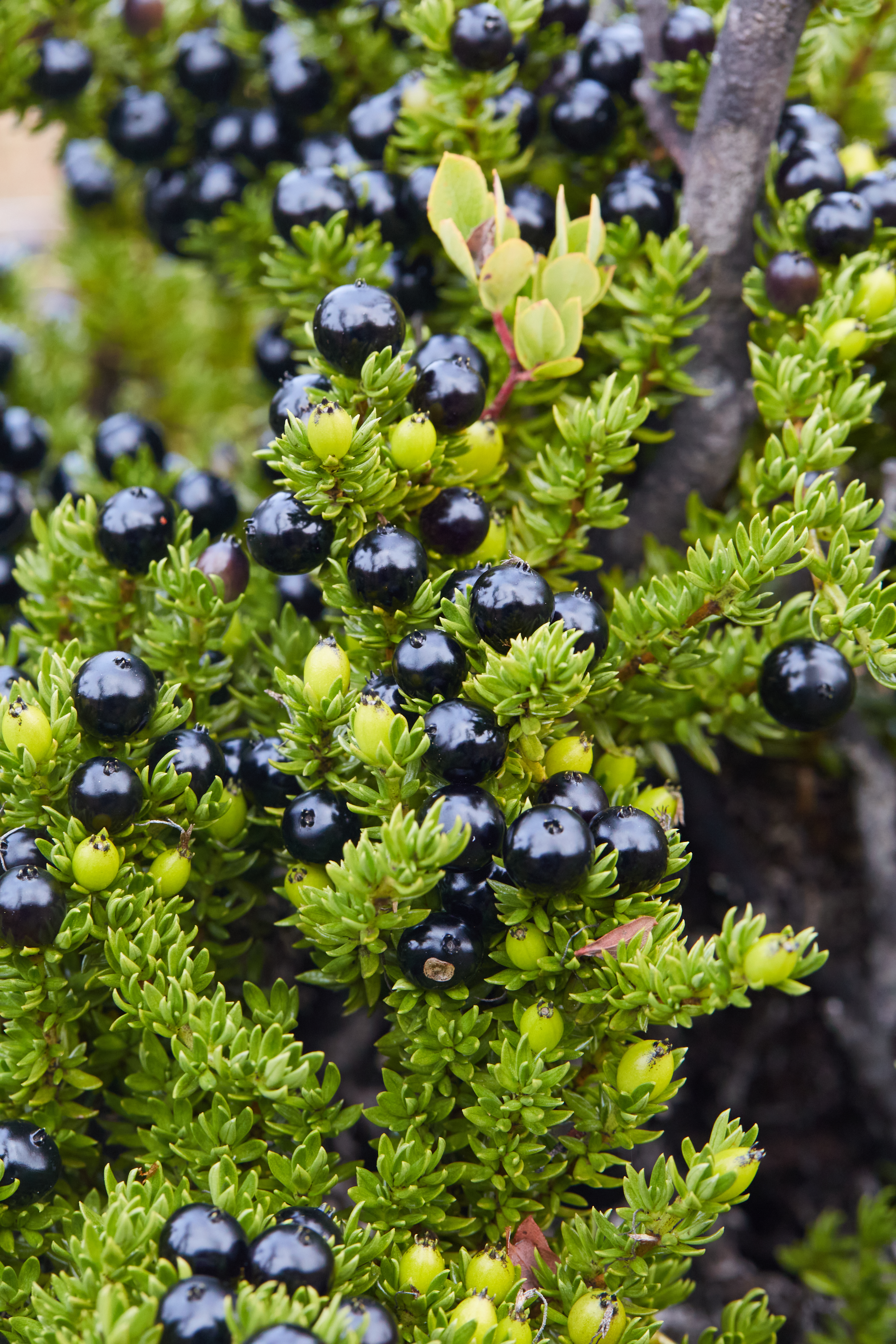

Scientific classification
- Kingdom: Plantae
- Clade: Tracheophytes
- Clade: Angiosperms
- Clade: Eudicots
- Clade: Asterids
- Order: Gentianales
- Family: Rubiaceae
- Genus: Coprosma
- Species: C. ernodeoides

Binomial name
- Coprosma ernodeoides Gray

= Coprosma ernodeoides =

Species of plant

Coprosma ernodeoides, known as black-fruited coprosma in English and kūkaenēnē or ʻaiakanēnē in Hawaiian, is a sprawling shrub occurring only on the islands of Maui and Hawai‘i.

== Description ==
Coprosma ernodeoides is a prostrate shrub with narrow, shiny, tightly packed, dark-green, opposite leaves. The flowers are small, and the most obviously visible features are the 8–20 mm pale style branches. The distinctive shiny black fruit are 8–13 mm in diameter. This is the only species of Coprosma on the Hawaiian islands with black fruit.

== Taxonomy ==
This species was described by Asa Gray in 1860 based on specimens collected by Archibald Menzies.

== Distribution and habitat ==
This plant is restricted to the alpine areas of Maui and Hawai‘i.

It inhabits a variety of open alpine sites, from lava and cinder fields to forest and shrublands.

== Ecology ==
The fruit are eaten by the nēnē.

== Uses ==
Native Hawaiians used the fruit to make lei, the inner bark to make a yellow dye, and the fruit to make purple to black dye.

== Etymology ==
The Hawaiian name kūkaenēnē means "nēnē dung" due to the resemblance of the fruit to the feces of the nēnē, coincident with the etymology of the name of the genus Coprosma which means "smelling like dung". The Hawaiian name ʻaiakanēnē means "food of the nēnē".
