= Prince Kūhiō Day =

Official Hawaiian holiday

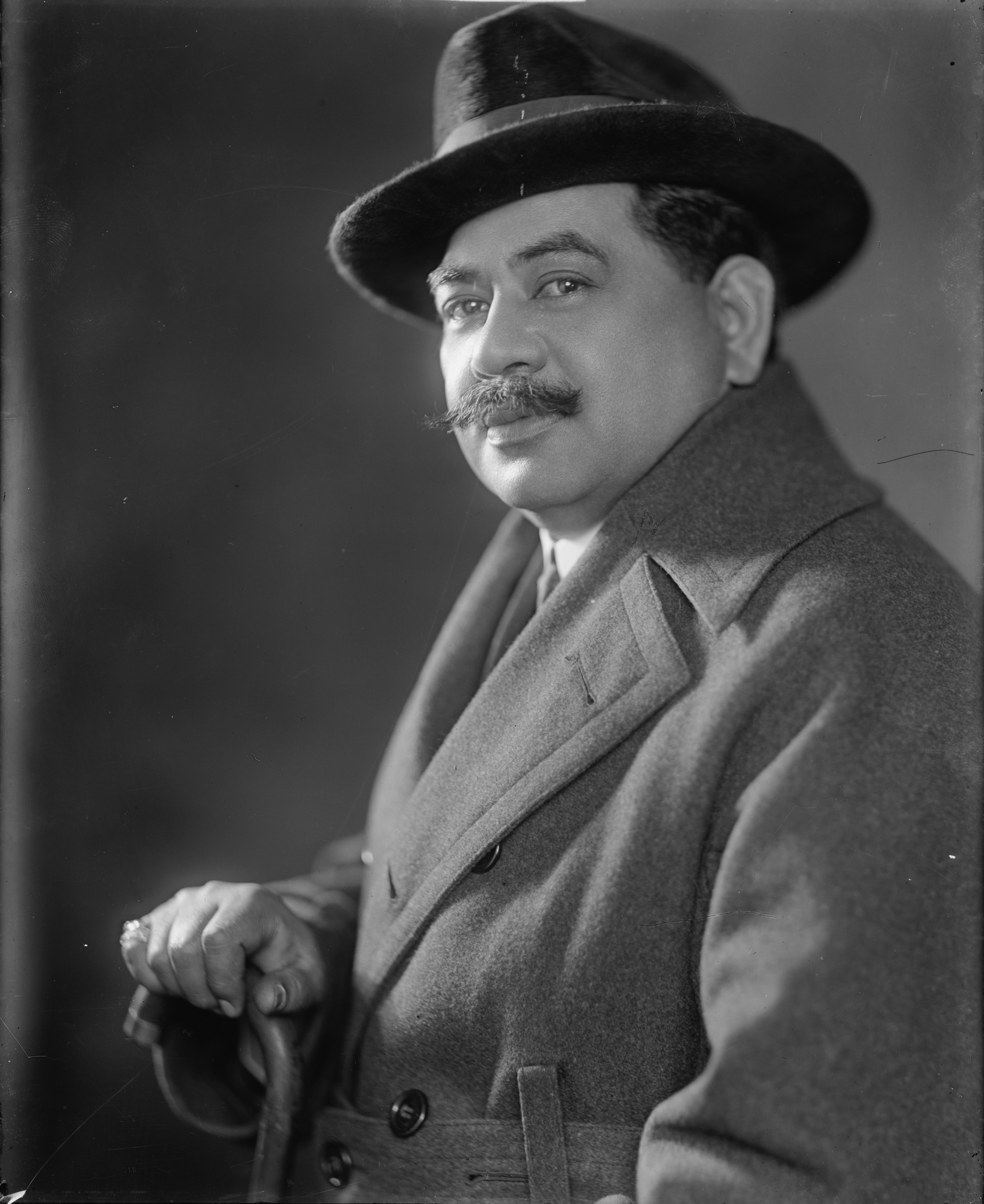
- Prince Jonah Kūhiō Kalanianaʻole Piʻikoi
- Also called: Kūhiō Day
- Observed by: Hawaii
- Significance: Birth of Prince Kūhiō and passage of Hawaiian Homelands Act.
- Celebrations: Parade
- Observances: Vacation: State and city workers, schools
- Date: March 26
- Next time: March 26, 2027
- Frequency: annual
- First time: 1949
- Related to: Kamehameha Day

Prince Kūhiō Day is an official holiday in the state of Hawaiʻi in the United States. It is celebrated annually on March 26, to mark the birth of Prince Jonah Kūhiō Kalanianaʻole — heir to the throne of the Kingdom of Hawaiʻi, prince of the House of Kalākaua, and later territorial delegate to the United States Congress. It was established in 1949 by the legislature of the Territory of Hawaii.

As a delegate, Kuhio authored the first Hawaii Statehood bill in 1919. He also won passage of the Hawaiian Homes Act, creating the Hawaiian Homes Commission and setting aside 200,000 acres (810 km^{2}) of land for Hawaiian homesteaders.

Prince Kūhiō Day is one of only two holidays in the United States dedicated to royalty, the other being Hawaiʻi's King Kamehameha Day on June 11.
