= Red Hill water crisis =

Environmental disaster in Honolulu, Hawaiʻi

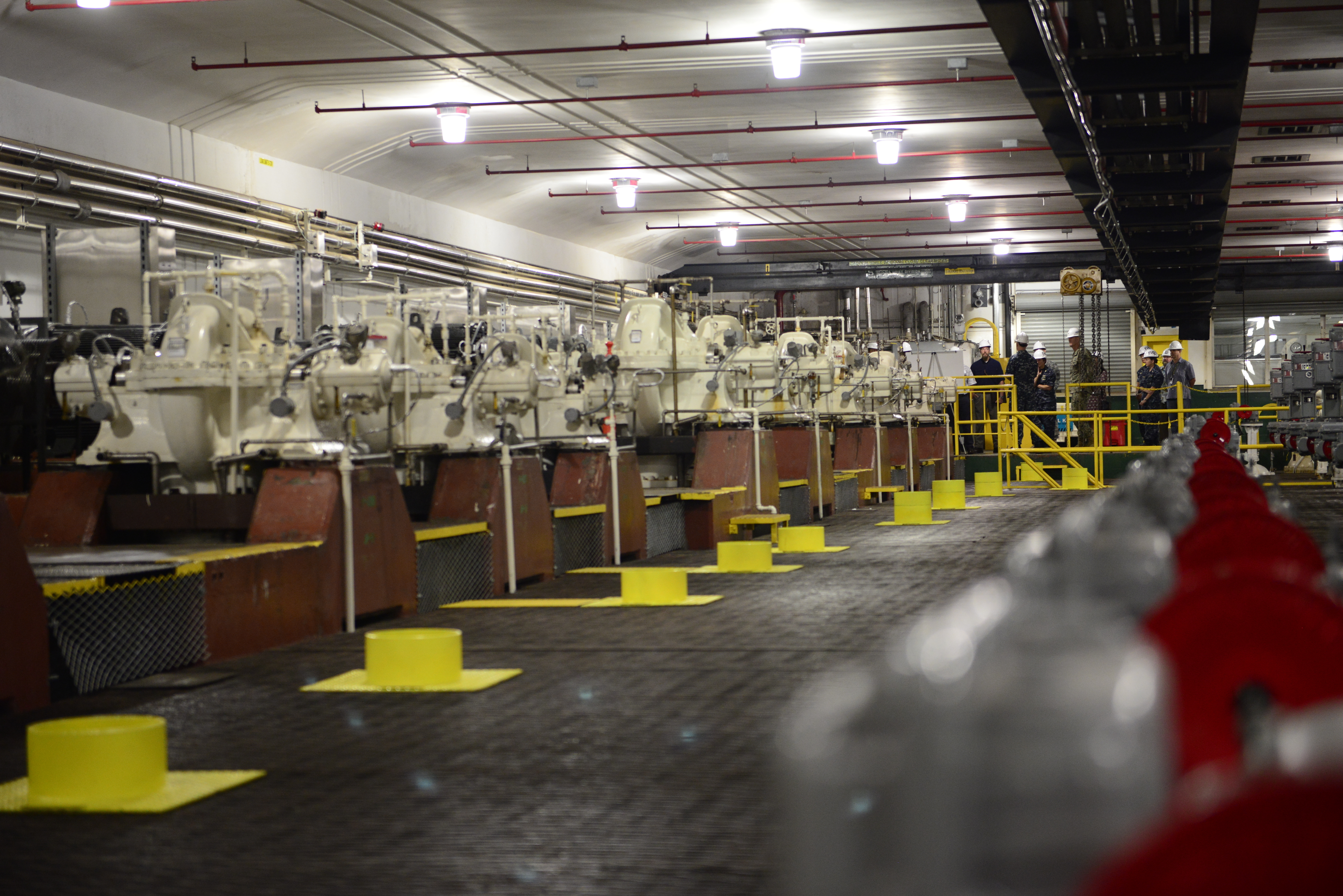
- Interior of the Red Hill Underground Fuel Storage Facility in 2016
- Date: November 20, 2021 – present
- Location: Joint Base Pearl Harbor–Hickam and urban Honolulu, Hawaiʻi, U.S.; 21°22′26″N 157°53′38″W
- Type: Groundwater contamination (various petroleum products)

The Red Hill water crisis is a public health crisis and environmental disaster caused by fuel leaking from the Red Hill Underground Fuel Storage Facility into the freshwater aquifer underneath the island of Oʻahu. Residents in military housing in and around Joint Base Pearl Harbor–Hickam began reporting chemical contamination in their tap water near the end of November 2021, and the Hawaiʻi Department of Health advised residents to stop using their tap water on November 29, 2021. All residents of the area (not just military housing) were unable to use their tap water until the following March, after their water system was flushed of contaminants.

The fuel spill from the Red Hill facility also forced the shutdown of several water sources operated by the Honolulu Board of Water Supply that provided drinking water for urban Honolulu. Due to uncertainty about the spread of fuel contamination underground, these water sources will remain shut down indefinitely, which has caused a shortage of water for Honolulu residents. Voluntary water usage reductions were announced on March 10, 2022, and compliance has avoided the imposition of mandatory water restrictions as of May 2022.

== Background ==
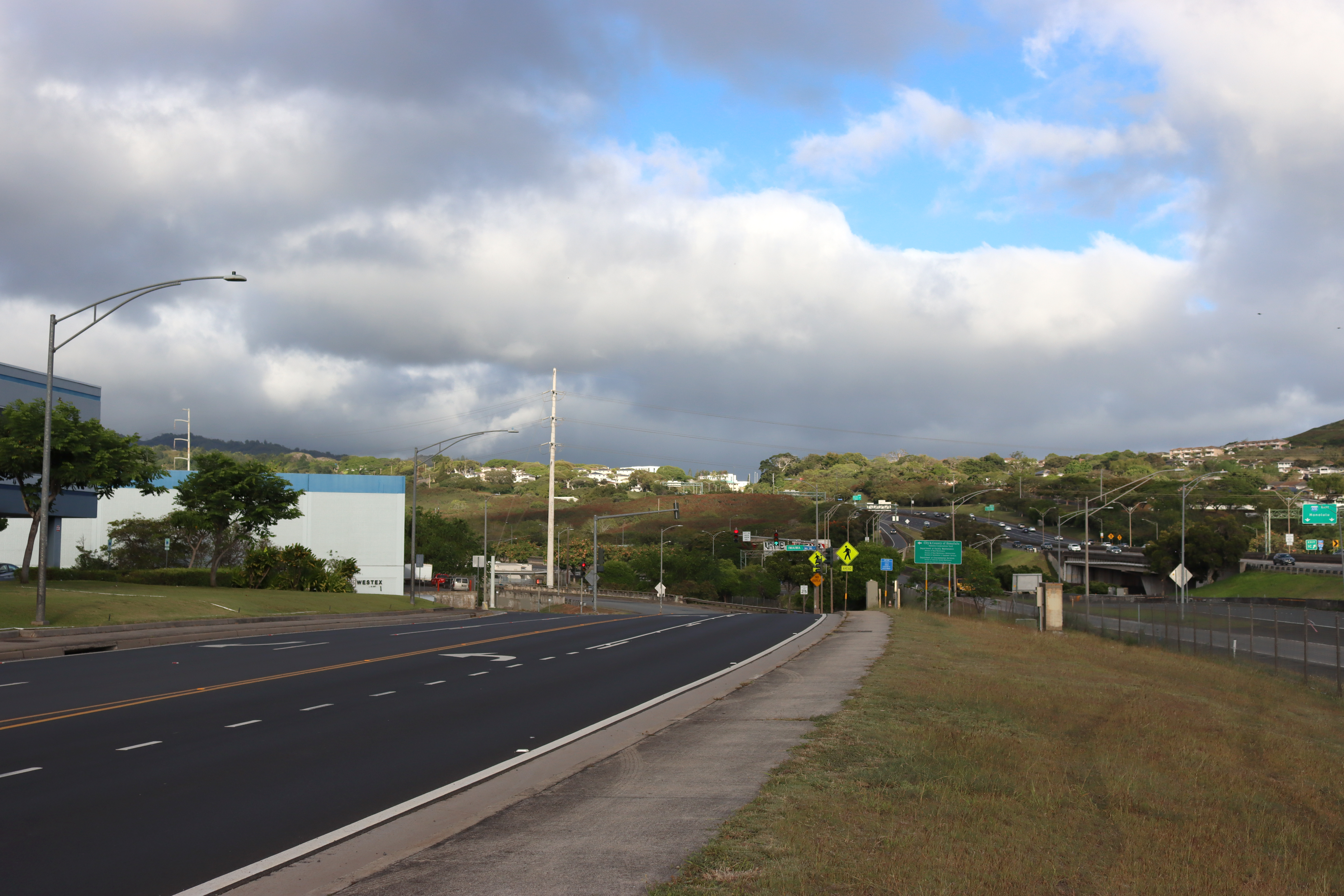
Red Hill as viewed from Hālawa Valley

=== Red Hill Underground Fuel Storage Facility ===
The Red Hill Underground Fuel Storage Facility (formally named the Red Hill Bulk Fuel Storage Facility) was originally completed by the U.S. Navy in 1943, to replace above-ground storage tanks that were vulnerable to air attack. The Red Hill facility includes twenty underground fuel storage tanks. Each tank is 100 feet (30 meters) in diameter and 250 feet (76 meters) in height, and can store 12.5 million U.S. gallons (47.3 million liters) of fuel, for a total storage capacity of approximately 250 million U.S. gallons (946 million liters). The fuel stored at the Red Hill facility is used by ships and aircraft based at Joint Base Pearl Harbor–Hickam. The facility's location within the Red Hill ridge about 2 1/2 miles (4.0 kilometers) from Pearl Harbor was selected to allow fuel to flow from the storage tanks to Pearl Harbor by gravity.

The placement of the Red Hill facility also meant that it was located directly above a freshwater aquifer that supplies the island of Oʻahu with the bulk of the island's drinking water. A major leak of 27,000 U.S. gallons (100,000 liters) of fuel in January 2014 drew attention from both the Environmental Protection Agency (EPA) and the Hawaiʻi Department of Health (DOH), which led to the Navy entering into an agreement (formally titled the "Administrative Order on Consent," or AOC) to enhance monitoring for leaks and build structural improvements that would reduce the chance of a leak occurring. The AOC also required the Navy to implement a secondary containment solution (such as building a tank-within-a-tank) or empty the Red Hill facility by 2042. Following the implementation of the AOC, Rear Admiral Robert Chadwick (the then-commander of Navy Region Hawaii) was quoted in 2019, "People can rest assured that what happened in 2014, that type of event could not happen again with the procedures we have in place now."

=== Water systems ===
The Navy operates a water system that serves approximately 93,000 people on Joint Base Pearl Harbor–Hickam and in military housing in nearby areas. This system also serves Kapilina Beach Homes, a former military housing area in Iroquois Point that was converted into civilian rental housing. This water system distributes water collected from three water sources, one of which is approximately 2,600 feet (790 meters) from the storage tanks at the Red Hill facility.

The Honolulu Board of Water Supply (BWS) is the municipal water utility for the island of Oʻahu, and is an agency of the City and County of Honolulu. BWS operates an islandwide water system that serves nearly all of Oʻahu's 1 million residents with water from 100 water sources that tap into groundwater located in aquifers underneath the island. The largest of these was the Hālawa Shaft, which provided approximately 10–12 million U.S. gallons (38–45 million liters) of water per day, which is about 20% of the water used by urban Honolulu. The Hālawa Shaft is located approximately 5,000 feet (1,500 meters) from the storage tanks at the Red Hill facility.

Both water systems draw water from the same aquifer under Hālawa Valley and Red Hill, where the water table is located about 100 feet (30 meters) below the Red Hill storage tanks.

== Water contamination ==
On May 6, 2021, approximately 20,000 U.S. gallons (76,000 liters) of fuel leaked from a storage tank at the Red Hill facility when an operator error caused a pressure surge within a pipeline in the facility, which in turn caused the pipeline to rupture and leak fuel. Most of the leaked fuel then flowed into a drain line that was part of the facility's fire suppression system. The fuel sat in the drain line for the next six months, until a cart crashed into the drain line on November 20, 2021, rupturing the drain line and releasing the fuel, where it then flowed into the ground surrounding the facility and into the aquifer. The November 20 leak occurred approximately 1,300 feet (400 meters) from a well that provided water for the Navy water system.

An internal investigation by the Navy into the May 6 and November 20 leaks found that the initial error that caused the May 6 leak was compounded by a failure to properly investigate and account for where the leaked fuel went within the facility. In the aftermath of the May 6 leak, Red Hill facility staff erroneously believed that the leaked fuel remained in a pipeline in the facility's fuel distribution system, and were not aware that the fuel had entered the facility's fire suppression system.

Beginning in the late spring of 2021 (at around the same time as the May 6 leak), residents living in military housing in the vicinity of Joint Base Pearl Harbor–Hickam began suffering from unusual medical problems, including hair falling out, fatigue, and skin rashes. Within one week of the November 20 leak, residents saw that their water had an oily sheen and smelled like fuel. The DOH issued a notice on November 29 advising Navy water system users to stop drinking and using their tap water. While the Navy initially declared the water safe, the Navy acknowledged that their water system was seriously contaminated with petroleum products on December 2, and began evacuating residents from affected military housing areas the following day. About 4,000 families moved into nearby hotels since their tap water at home was unusable. The Navy collected water samples from over 1,000 affected homes to gauge the scope of contamination, but only tested a subset of those water samples for total organic carbons, with the remaining samples never tested at all.

The Navy's water well nearest to the Red Hill facility was found to be heavily contaminated with 140,000 parts per billion (ppb) of total petroleum hydrocarbons associated with diesel (TPH-d) and 20,000 parts per billion of total petroleum hydrocarbons associated with gasoline (TPH-g). The safe limits for these chemicals in drinking water are 400 parts per billion for TPH-d and 300 parts per billion for TPH-g. Water in piping at a second Navy well was also found to be contaminated above the safe limit, with 920 parts per billion of TPH-d.

A survey jointly conducted by the DOH and the Centers for Disease Control and Prevention in January and February 2022 found that 87% of 2,289 individuals surveyed reported being sickened by fuel contamination in their water. 37% of those surveyed reported seeking medical care to address their symptoms, and seventeen individuals were hospitalized overnight.

== Cleanup efforts ==
Remediation of the Navy's water well nearest to the Red Hill facility began with Navy divers entering the well to skim fuel from the surface of the well water. In January 2022, this shifted to pumping water from the well through activated carbon filters and discharging the filtered water in Hālawa Stream. Pumping out contaminated groundwater is intended to prevent the spilled fuel from spreading further into the aquifer. Pumping water into Hālawa Stream continues as of June 2022 and is expected to continue for the foreseeable future, until the DOH determines that the underground fuel plume is not moving through the aquifer.

Two of the three wells supplying the Navy water system were shut down due to contamination, but the third well was able to continue providing clean water and remained in operation; however, fuel from the contaminated water had leached into the piping of the Navy water system and rendered it unable to deliver clean water. To remediate the Navy water system, clean water was systematically pumped through contaminated sections of the water system until testing determined that contamination was below safe levels. Decontamination of the Navy water system was declared complete on March 18, 2022, with regular testing expected to continue for at least six months afterward.

Although the Navy water system has been officially considered safe to use since March 18, 2022, residents who use the Navy water system have continued to find water contamination and suffer from medical problems (such as unusual skin rashes) as of July 2022.

== Effects on Oʻahu water supply ==
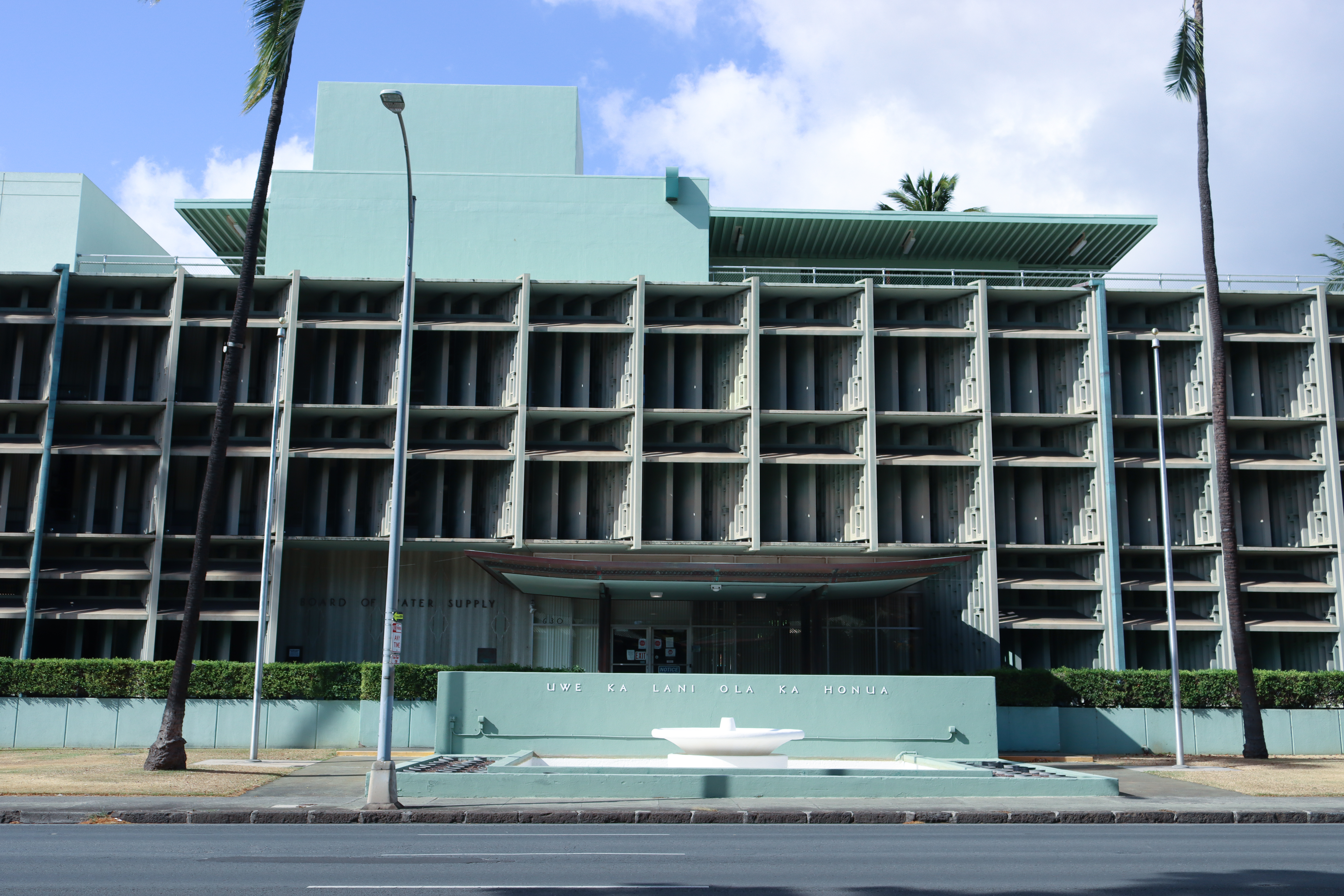
Main office of the Honolulu Board of Water Supply

BWS stopped pumping water from the Hālawa Shaft on December 2, 2021, three days after the DOH issued their advisory notice to Navy water system users. While no contaminants were detected in water pumped from the Hālawa Shaft, BWS shut down the Hālawa Shaft due to the risk that continuing to pump water would draw contaminants through the aquifer under Hālawa Valley and eventually into the BWS water system. Two other BWS wells were also shut down on December 8 after contamination was found in a second Navy water well.

Shutting down the three water sources did not result in immediate water shortages because the shutdowns occurred during the wet winter season, but as water usage rose during the following spring, BWS issued a request for Oʻahu water users to voluntarily reduce water consumption by 10% on March 10. The water shortage was anticipated to have severe impacts on Honolulu over the summer, including curtailing planned construction projects and the imposition of mandatory water restrictions, but as of May 24, 2022, BWS has stated that voluntary reductions in water use have been enough to avoid more drastic measures.

BWS has stated that the Hālawa Shaft and the other two wells will remain shut down indefinitely due to uncertainty about the spread of the underground fuel plume. Constructing new water sources to replace the lost pumping capacity is expected to take five to seven years. A monitoring well that is about 1,500 feet (460 meters) southeast of the Red Hill facility was reported to have petroleum contamination in August 2022.

== Shutdown of Red Hill Underground Fuel Storage Facility ==
As the state agency responsible for regulating underground storage tanks, the DOH issued an emergency order on December 6, 2021 directing the Navy to shut down the Red Hill facility. Under a provision of the Resource Conservation and Recovery Act, the DOH has the authority to regulate and oversee the Red Hill facility even though the facility is owned and operated by the federal government. The Navy sought a contested case hearing to challenge the DOH emergency order, and the order was upheld on December 27 and went into effect on January 3, 2022.

At the direction of U.S. Secretary of Defense Lloyd Austin, the Navy has agreed to comply with the DOH's emergency order, and will not contest the DOH's authority to issue the order or the validity of the order. Under a revised emergency order issued by the DOH, the Navy has submitted a plan to defuel the Red Hill facility and is required to submit a plan to shut down the facility by November 1, 2022. A consultant for the Navy determined that emptying the fuel from the Red Hill facility's tanks will require extensive repairs that must be completed to address numerous safety hazards (such as fire hazards and corroded piping) within the facility, and under the Navy's defueling plan submitted to the DOH, the Red Hill facility will be emptied of fuel no earlier than December 31, 2024.

== Litigation ==
In 2017, the Sierra Club of Hawaiʻi brought legal action against the DOH for exempting the Red Hill storage tanks from being regulated, citing the agency's failure to enforce a 1992 statute requiring the replacement or upgrading of underground storage tanks by December 1998 to prevent fuel leaks. Later, in February 2018, the Sierra Club won the case after the Environmental Court found the DOH guilty of violating state law.

In several legal cases brought under the Federal Tort Claims Act (FTCA), 7,500 people sued the Navy over the water contamination and possible resulting health effects. While active members of the military are not allowed to sue the federal government, their families can. The first trial began in April 2024. Although the U.S. government had taken responsibility for the leak before the trials began, its lawyers challenged that the plaintiffs had not experienced exposure levels high enough to result in the alleged health effects. In May 2025, 17 families were granted $682,000 in damages, with amounts per plaintiff ranging from $5,000 to over $104,000. The rulings set a precedent for the remaining cases—spanning relatives of military members, civilians, and service members—still awaiting reparations, after a federal judge found the U.S. government liable.

BWS also filed an FTCA claim against the Navy for $1.2 billion, primarily to recover the costs of establishing new water sources to replace the Hālawa Shaft and other closed wells. BWS' claim is expected to result in a protracted court case.

== Community-led initiatives ==
The Sierra Club of Hawaiʻi has engaged in community organizing and policy advocacy in response to the Red Hill water crisis and emphasizes environmental justice while amplifying the concerns of affected stakeholders, including community members, military families, grassroots groups, and public agencies.

The University of Hawaiʻi launched a health registry program on August 2, 2025, to provide support and track the long-term health effects of individuals exposed to the 2021 jet-fuel-contaminated drinking water from the Navy water line on Oʻahu.

== See also ==
- Camp Lejeune water contamination
- Flint water crisis
- Timeline of events related to per- and polyfluoroalkyl substances
