= Puʻu ʻŌʻō =

Volcanic cone in the Hawaiian Islands

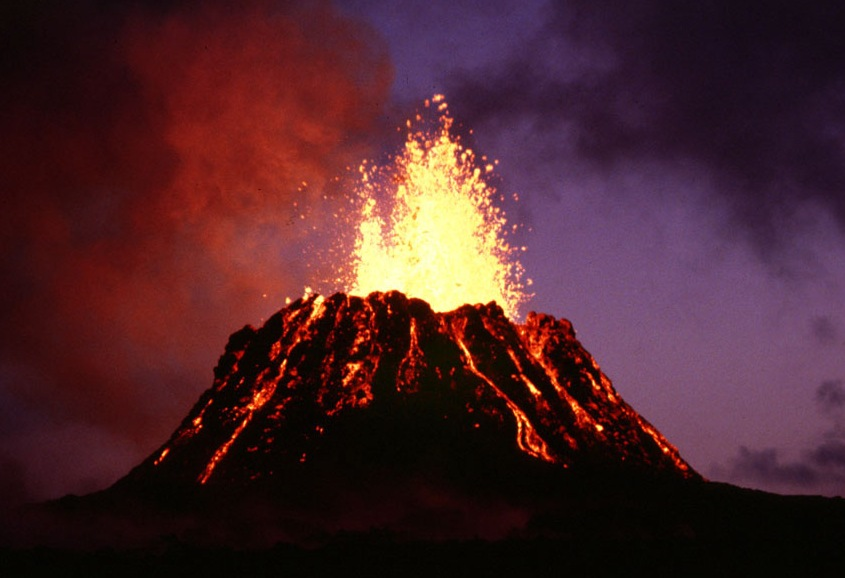
- View at dusk, June 1983

Highest point
- Elevation: 2,290 ft (700 m)
- Coordinates: 19°23′11″N 155°06′18″W

Geography
- Location: Hawaii County, Hawaii, US
- Parent range: Hawaiian Islands
- Topo map: USGS Kalalua

Geology
- Rock age: 43 years
- Mountain type: Cinder/spatter cone
- Volcanic zone: Hawaiian-Emperor seamount chain
- Last eruption: 1983–2018

Puʻu ʻŌʻō (also spelled Pu‘u‘ō‘ō, and often written Puu Oo, pronounced [ˈpuʔu ˈʔoːʔoː], poo-oo-OH-oh) is a volcanic cone on the eastern rift zone of Kīlauea volcano in the Hawaiian Islands. The eruption that created Puʻu ʻŌʻō began on January 3, 1983, and continued nearly continuously until April 30, 2018, making it the longest-lived rift-zone eruption of the last two centuries.

By January 2005, 2.7 cubic kilometers (0.65 mi^{3}) of magma covered an area of more than 117 square kilometers (45 mi^{2}) and added 230 acres (0.93 km^{2}) of land to the southeast coast of Hawaiʻi. The eruption claimed at least 189 buildings and 14 kilometers (8.7 mi) of highways, as well as a church, a store, the Wahaʻula Visitor Center, and many ancient Hawaiian sites, including the Wahaʻula heiau. The coastal highway has been closed since 1987, as parts of the road have been buried under lava up to 35 meters (115 ft) thick.

== Etymology ==
The hill was initially nicknamed "Puʻu O" by volcanologists, as its position when marked on a map of the area coincided with an "o" in "Lava flow of 1965". Later, the elders of the village of Kalapana were asked to name the new hill, and chose Puʻu ʻŌʻō, meaning hill of the digging stick. The name is also often translated as "Hill of the ʻŌʻō Bird". In 2021, the Hawaiʻi Board of Geographic Names updated the spelling of the cone as Pu‘u‘ō‘ō for consistency with the board's spelling guidelines. The Hawaiian Volcano Observatory began following the new recommended naming convention shortly thereafter.

== Geologic history ==
=== 1983–1986: High lava fountains build tall cinder and spatter cone ===
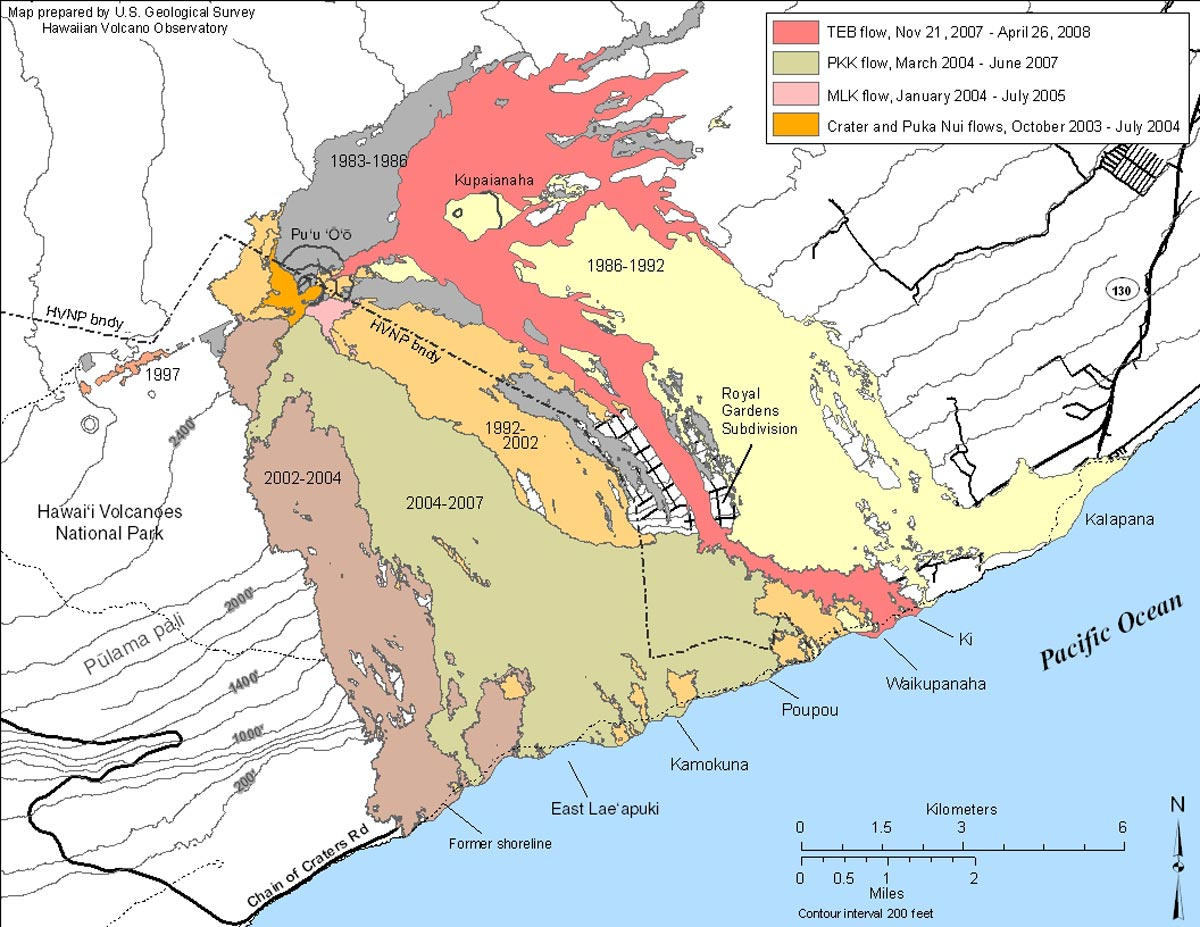
USGS Map of Historic Flows 1983 – April 2008

The Puʻu ʻŌʻō eruption began when fissures split the ground in the remote rainforest of the eastern rift zone, on January 3, 1983. By June 1983, the activity had strengthened and localized to the Puʻu ʻŌʻō vent. Over the next three years, 44 eruptive episodes with lava fountains as high as 460 meters (1,510 ft) stopped traffic at points across east Hawaiʻi. The fallout of cinder and spatter from the towering lava fountains built a cone 255 meters (837 ft) high.

=== 1986–1991: Eruption shifts east to Kūpaʻianahā ===
In July 1986, the conduit feeding magma to Puʻu ʻŌʻō ruptured, and the eruption abruptly shifted 3 kilometers (1.9 mi) downrift to form the Kūpaʻianahā vent. With the new vent came a new style of eruption: continuous, quiet effusion from a lava lake replaced the episodic high fountaining. After a few weeks, a roof formed over the main lava outflow channel, which created a lava tube. The lava tube allowed the fluid pahoehoe lava to retain heat and flow long distances. In less than a year, overflow from the lake created a broad and low shield about 55 meters (180 ft) above Kūpaʻianahā.

Lava streams were first visible from the village of Kapaʻahu in November, 1986. In the course of that month, lava cut a swath through Kapaʻahu, covered the coastal highway, and finally reached the ocean 12 kilometers (7.5 mi) from the vent. Some weeks later, the lava flow shifted eastwards and buried 14 houses in the town of Kalapana within one day. The lava flow at Kalapana ceased when the lava tube system shut down.

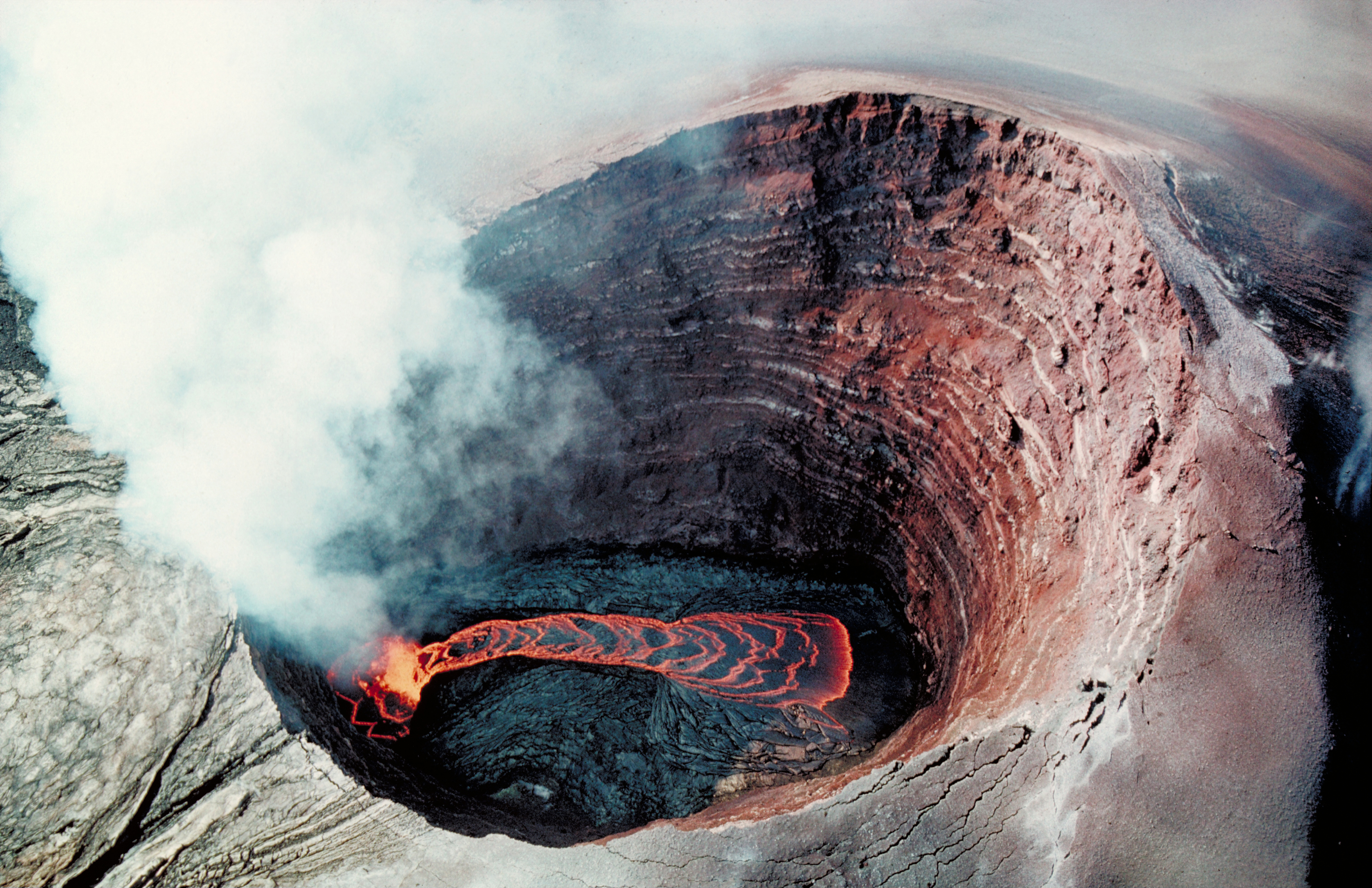
Aerial view of Puʻu ʻŌʻō taken on August 30, 1990

In 1990, the eruption entered its most destructive phase, when flows turned eastward and completely destroyed the villages of Kalapana and Kaimū. Kaimū Bay and Kalapana Black Sand Beach were also completely covered with lava. Over 100 homes were destroyed by the ever-broadening flow field in a nine-month period. New tubes diverted lava away from Kalapana early in 1991, and lava once again entered the ocean within Hawaii Volcanoes National Park.

=== 1992–2013: Steady lava effusion ===
The volume of lava erupted from Kūpaʻianahā declined steadily through 1991, and in early 1992, the vent died. The eruption then returned to Puʻu ʻŌʻō, where flank vents on the west and southwest sides of the cone constructed a new lava shield. Soon lava tubes were feeding lava from the vents to the ocean, with few surface flows in between. The flank vents have held center stage ever since, with the exception of a two-month pause in activity, early in 1997, which followed a brief fissure eruption in Nāpau Crater, a short distance southwest of Puʻu ʻŌʻō.

On the evening of January 29, 1997, a series of earthquakes struck Kīlauea's east rift zone. Deep within the rift zone, magma was escaping from the conduit leading to the Puʻu ʻŌʻō vent, cutting off the supply to the ongoing eruption. The lava pond at Puʻu ʻŌʻō drained, and residents 10 miles (16 km) away heard a low, rumbling roar as the crater floor dropped 500 feet (150 m) and the west wall of the Puʻu ʻŌʻō cone collapsed. A few hours later, as magma found a new path to the surface, the ground cracked in nearby Nāpau Crater, and lava fountains lit up the night sky. However, activity in this area was short-lived, and the center of activity soon shifted back to Puʻu ʻŌʻō.

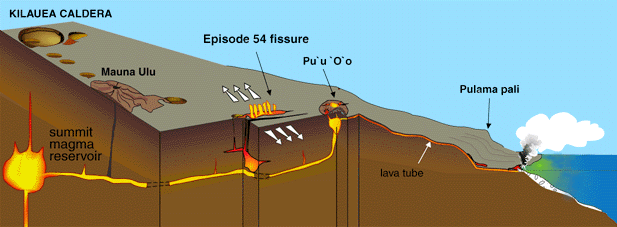
Cutaway of Puʻu ʻŌʻō January 1997

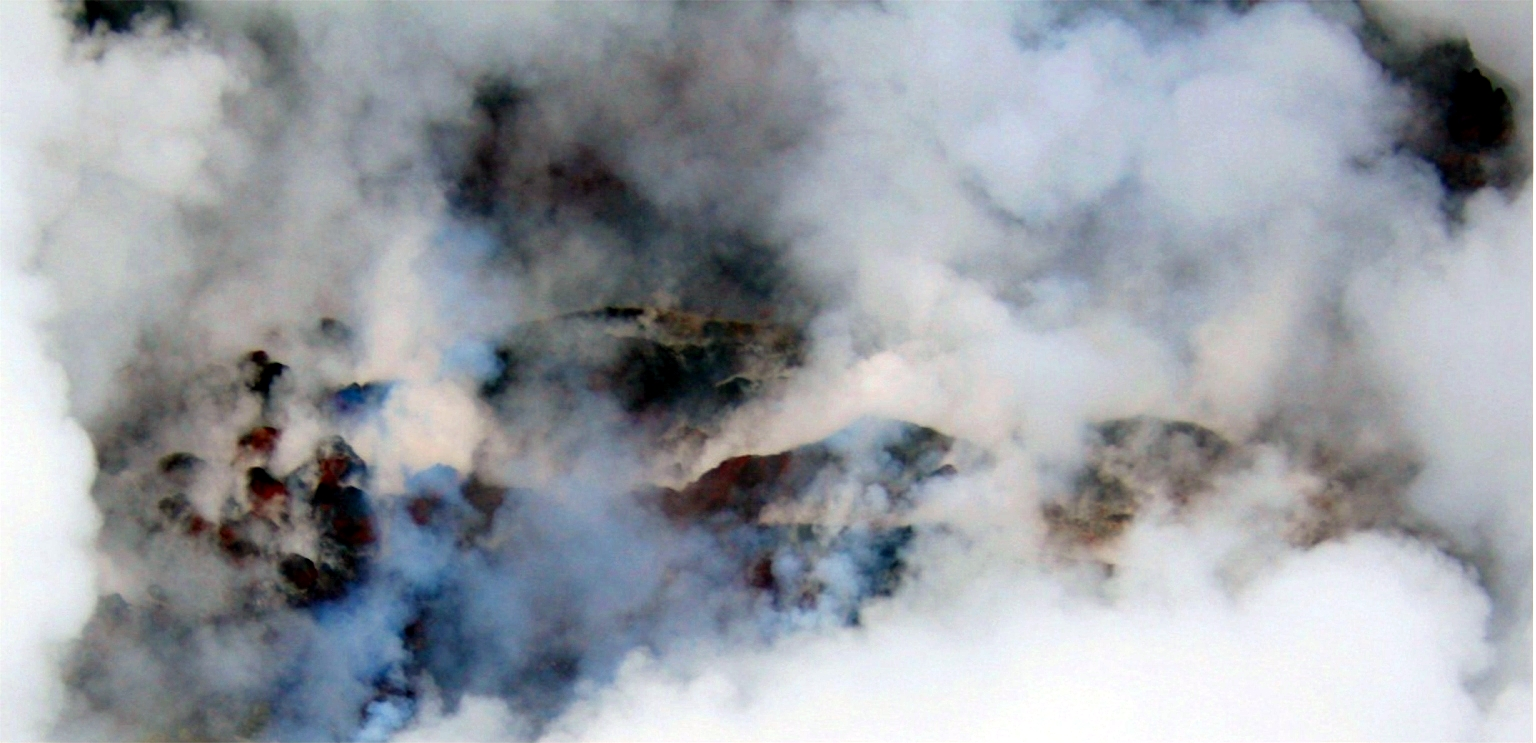
Aerial view of Puʻu ʻŌʻō taken on September 10, 2007

As of January 2007, 3.1 cubic km of lava had covered 117 km^{2} (45 sq mi) and added 201 hectares (500 acres) to Kīlauea's southern shore. The new shoreline was 15.6 km (9.7 mi) long. The lava flows have destroyed 189 structures and covered 14 km (8.7 mi) of highway with as much as 35 m (115 ft) of lava.

In 2007, after a cluster of earthquakes, activity in Puʻu ʻŌʻō subsided and the crater floor collapsed, with no incandescence visible in the crater after the end of August. Lava began emerging from a series of cracks in the northeast rift zone and spread slowly east and south as a perched flow, with slow advances of ʻaʻā. The flow spread mostly over flows of 1983–1986, with minor incursions into adjoining forests.

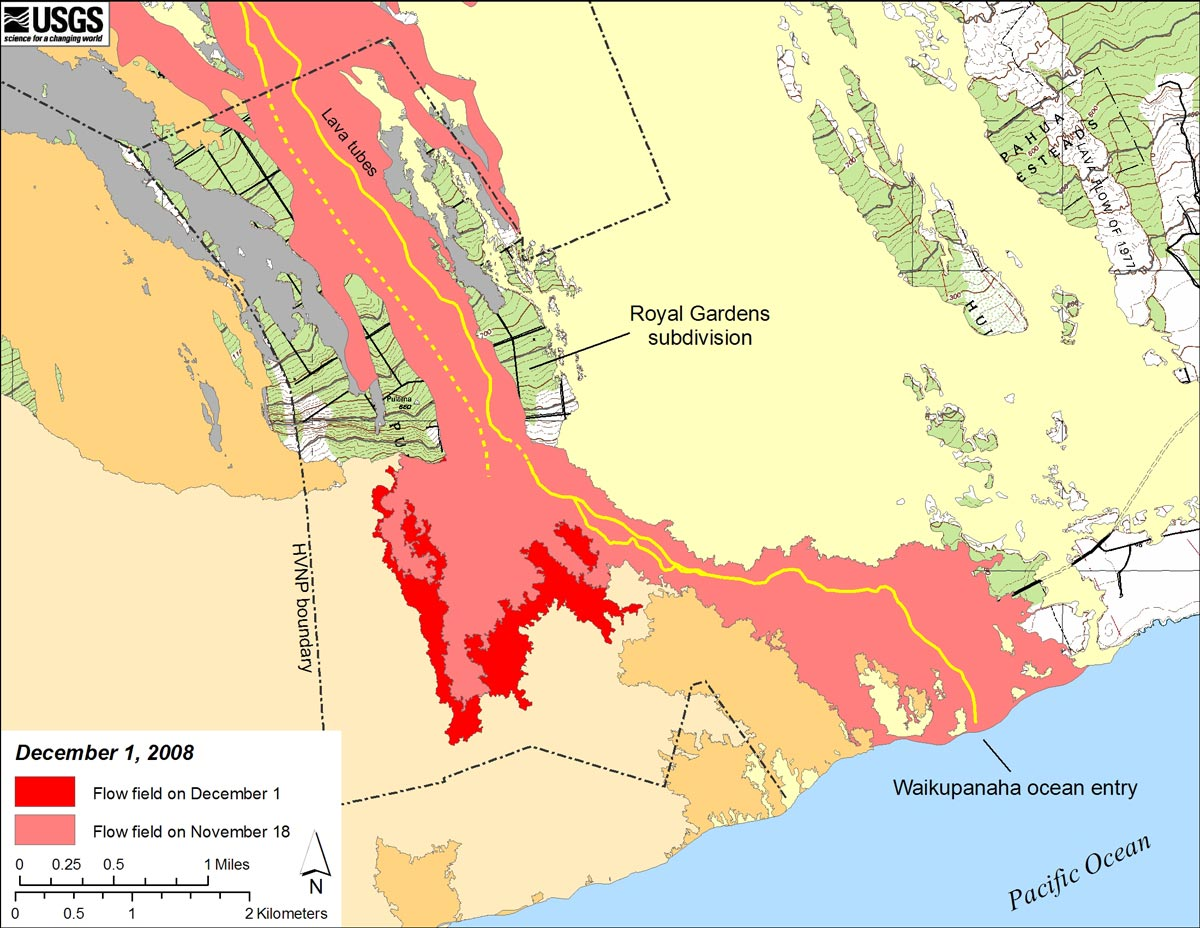
USGS map of 2008 lava flows

In late July 2008, additional flows extended from the eastern vents of Puʻu ʻŌʻō and in October multiple new fissures opened along the length of the tube expanding into Royal Gardens Subdivision and covered a large area of the coastal flats in November 2008.

On March 5, 2011, the floor of the Puʻu ʻŌʻō crater deflated, then collapsed. Two hours later, a new eruption occurred in Kīlauea's middle east zone, between Puʻu ʻŌʻō and Napau Crater. Lava fountains were reported to be 65 feet (20 m) high.

On March 26, 2011, lava began to refill the crater's floor, being visible in USGS HVO webcam. The USGS stated that the accumulation of lava had put the crater floor about 39 m (128 ft) below the eastern crater rim, as of June 1.

On September 21, 2011, lava in the west lava lake in Puʻu ʻŌʻō Crater fed a series of lava flows that traveled down the west flank of Puʻu ʻŌʻō during September 20–21. At about 0225 UTC on September 21, activity in the crater and overflows to the west suddenly decreased, as lava broke through the upper east flank of Puʻu ʻŌʻō, bypassing the crater. The new fissure fed a channelized ʻaʻā lava flow that advanced rapidly downslope 2.5 km (1.6 mi) southeast. A second flow to the west of the first began the next day. In addition, a small pad of lava actively refilled the bottom of the drained east lava lake and small flows were barely active at the west edge of Puʻu ʻŌʻō Crater. The channelized ʻaʻā lava flow reached 3.7 km (2.3 mi) long on 23 September and then stalled within the Kahaualeʻa Natural Area Reserve. Most of the active lava spread south and west of Puʻu Halulu (1.3 km or 0.8 mi northeast of Puʻu ʻŌʻō) during 23–27 September. Minor lava activity resumed within Puʻu ʻOʻo Crater with short lava flows issuing from the base of the east wall on 25 September and from the west wall base during 25–26 September. The crater floor of Puʻu ʻŌʻō slowly subsided. Lava activity resumed within the east lake on 26 September. The floor of the crater continued to subside during 26–27 September, opening up cracks in the north crater floor.

The 2011 activity ultimately destroyed all remaining homes in the Royal Gardens Subdivision. Jack Thompson evacuated his home March 2, 2012. His evacuation and return to the property was documented by Leigh Hilbert.

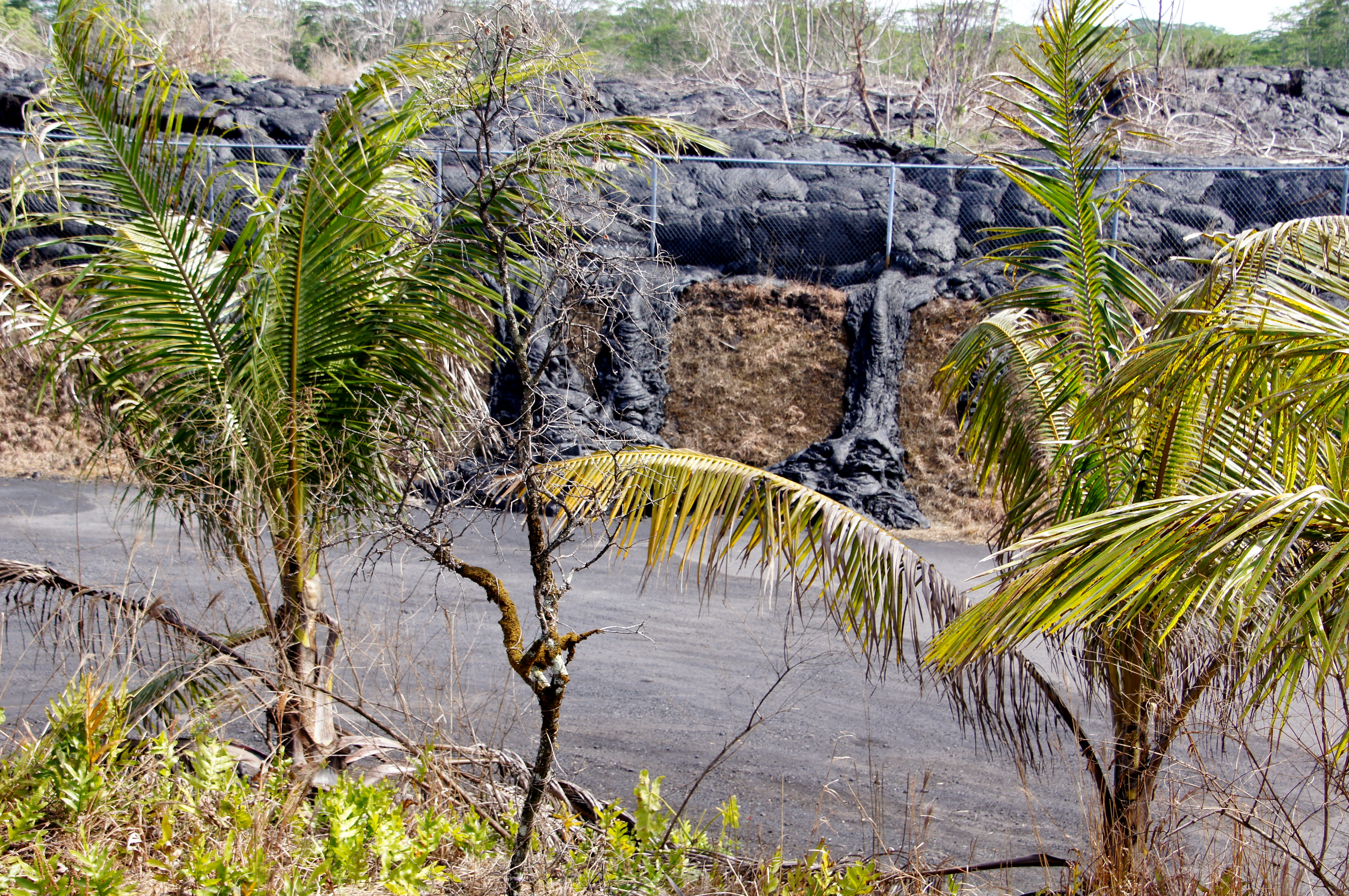
Lava from the Puʻu ʻŌʻō cinder cone flowed 14 miles into the town of Pāhoa. The lava breached the boundary of the Pāhoa Transfer Station.

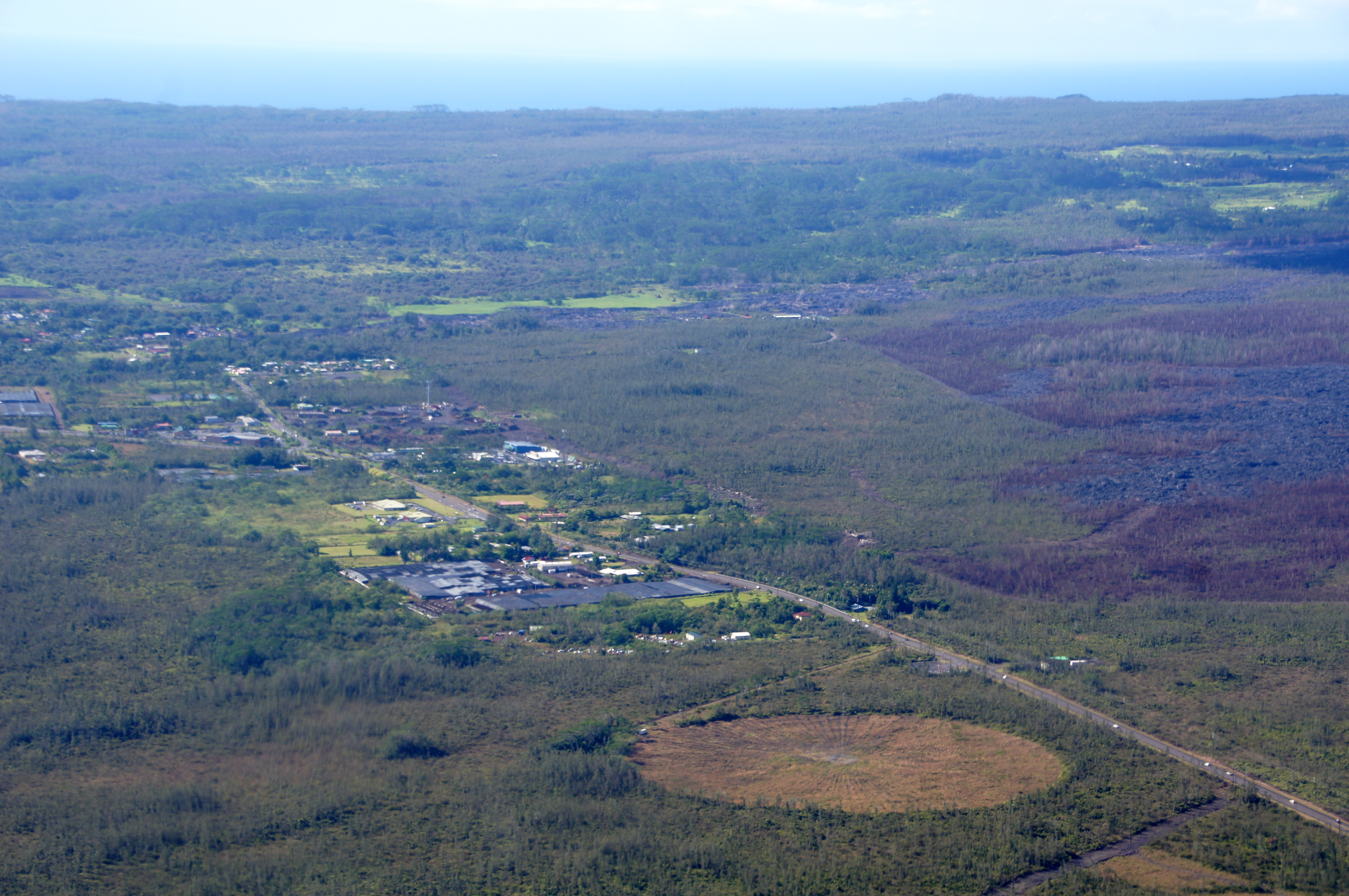
March 2015. Looking south toward the town of Pāhoa, and southwest toward the lava flow from Puʻu ʻOʻo – outlined by burned vegetation.

=== 2014–2016: Lava flow threatens Pāhoa ===
On June 27, 2014, new vents opened on the northeast flank of the Puʻu ʻŌʻō cone that fed a narrow lava flow to the east-northeast. On August 18, the flow entered a ground crack, traveled underground for several days, then resurfaced to form a small lava pond. The sequence was repeated twice more over the following days with lava entering other cracks and reappearing farther downslope. In this way, the flow had advanced approximately 13.2 km (8.2 mi) from the vent, or to within 1.3 km (0.81 mi) of the eastern boundary of the Wao Kele o Puna Forest Reserve, by the afternoon of September 3. Advancing to the northeast at intermittent rates, the flow had entered the village of Pāhoa and was within 25 meters (27 yards) of the waste recycling center on October 31.

In December 2014, a sustained lava breakout from this lava flow (informally named the "June 27 flow" by Hawaiian Volcano Observatory scientists) threatened to enter the town of Pāhoa, and to cut Highway 130, the only route into and out of Lower Puna. As a result, work was begun to reopen Chain of Craters Road, initially as a one-lane gravelled surface, and to make Railroad Avenue and Government Beach Road usable as emergency routes. However, the flow stopped just short of entering Pāhoa.

By March 2015, the June 27 flow retreated to within 6 kilometers of Pu‘u ‘Ō‘ō, greatly reducing the threat to Pāhoa. Lava from the June 27 flow remained active in this area through the remainder of 2015.

On May 24, 2016, a new vent opened on the east flank of Pu‘u ‘Ō‘ō that cut the supply of lava to the June 27th flow, which became inactive by June 8, 2016. Lava from the new vent, informally named the "61g" flow by the Hawaiian Volcano Observatory, flowed south and began entering the ocean at Kamokuna on July 26, 2016. Lava from the 61g flow covered part of the regraded (but never reopened) new section of the Chain of Craters Road. The road is kept flat for use by authorities, but is no longer a public thoroughfare.

=== 2018: Activity at Pu‘u ‘Ō‘ō stops; eruption shifts to the Lower East Rift Zone ===
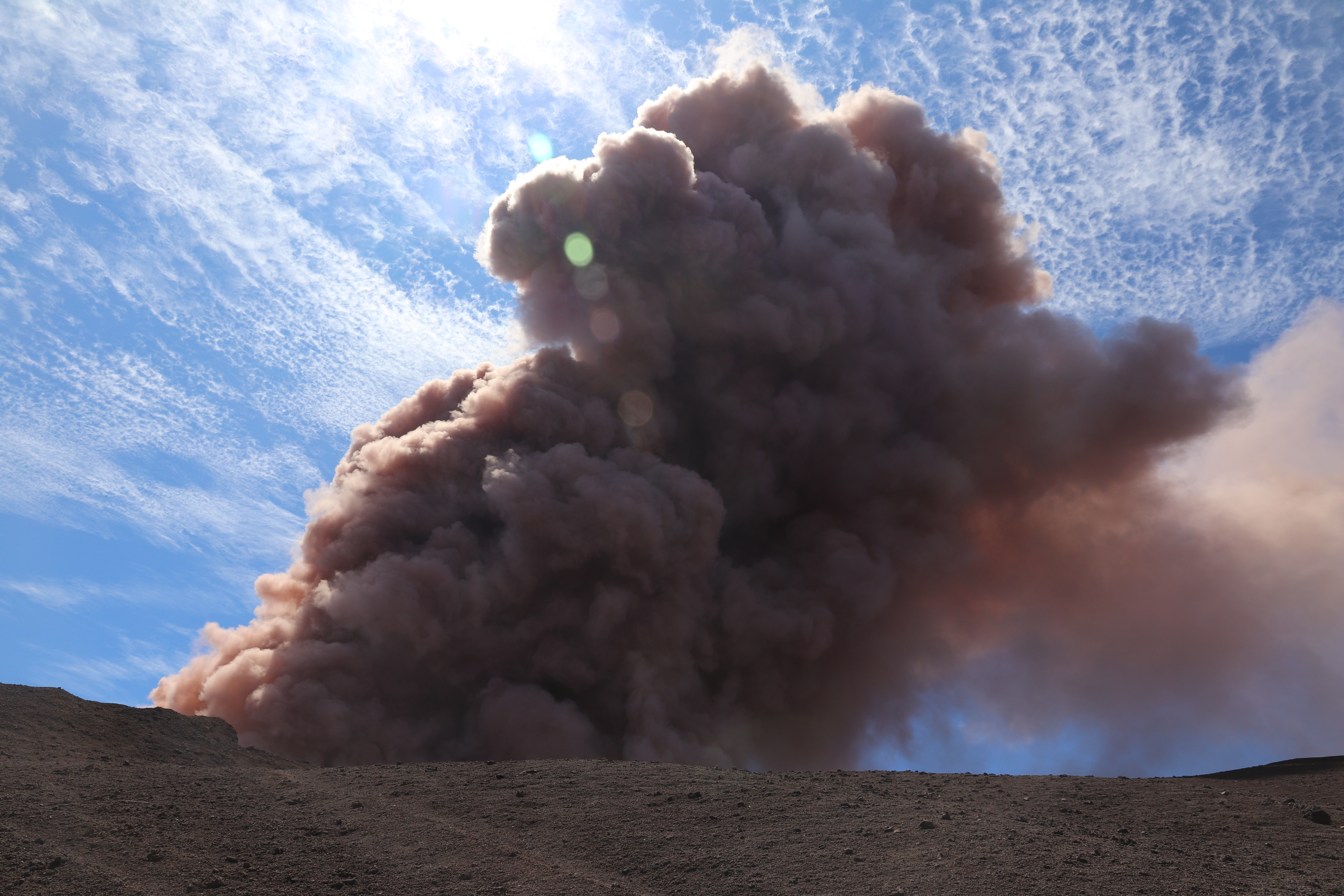
Collapse in the crater of Pu‘u ‘Ō‘ō, creating an ash plume (May 3, 2018)

On April 30, 2018, Pu‘u ‘Ō‘ō's crater floor collapsed as magma drained from the area beneath the cone. Following the collapse, seismicity and ground deformation increased downrift of Pu‘u ‘Ō‘ō. On May 3, fissures opened up at the Leilani Estates, marking the beginning of the 2018 lower Puna eruption. Through the rest of 2018, Pu‘u ‘Ō‘ō continued to experience intermittent collapses.

In January 2019, Hawaiian Volcano Observatory scientists stated that, considering historical data of prior rift zone eruptions and criteria used by the Global Volcanism Program to determine the end of an eruption, the Pu‘u ‘Ō‘ō eruption was most likely over.
