= Jamie S. Foster =

American astrobiologist, microbiologist, and academic

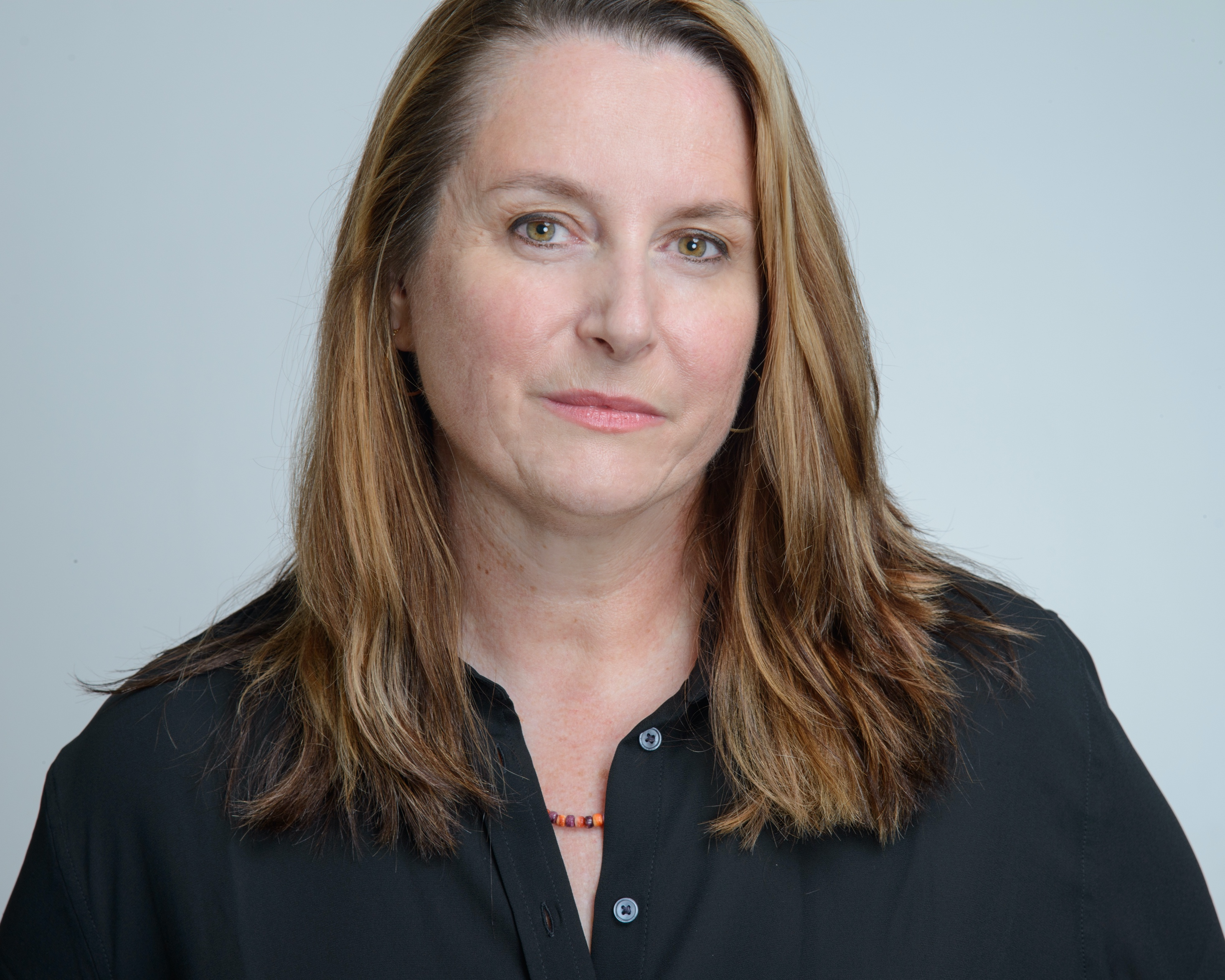
- Born: Salem, Massachusetts, U.S.
- Occupations: Astrobiologist, microbiologist, and academic

Academic background
- Education: BS Zoology; MS Biological Sciences; PhD Zoology
- Alma mater: University of Massachusetts; University of Southern California; University of Hawaiʻi

Academic work
- Institutions: University of Florida
- Website: https://microcell.ufl.edu/people/jamie-foster/

Jamie S. Foster is an American astrobiologist, microbiologist, and academic. She is an Assistant Director of the Astraeus Space Institute and a professor at the Department of Microbiology and Cell Science and the Genetics and Genomes Graduate Program at the University of Florida.

Foster's research is focused on space biology, symbiosis, and astrobiology. She is most known for her contributions to the fields of astrobiology and microbial ecology, particularly in enhancing comprehension of the intricate interactions between microorganisms and their ecological significance. She has received the 2021 President's Award from the American Society of Gravitational and Space Research.

== Education ==
Foster was raised in Ipswich, Massachusetts and graduated from Ipswich High School. She obtained a Bachelor of Science degree in Zoology from the University of Massachusetts at Amherst in 1992, where she was a student with Lynn Margulis. She then pursued a Master of Science degree in zoology from the University of Southern California and completed it in 1996. She then chose to further her education with doctoral advisor Margaret McFall-Ngai and obtained a PhD in Zoology from the University of Hawaiʻi in 2000, where she examined the impact that beneficial microbes have on host animal development. Later, she worked as a Postdoctoral Fellow at the National Institute of Dental and Craniofacial Research at the National Institutes of Health from 2001 to 2003 with advisor Paul Kolenbrander. She then began a second Postdoctoral Fellow in the Biospherics Branch of the NASA Ames Research Center from 2003 to 2005 with advisor Lynn J. Rothschild.

== Career ==
Foster began her academic career in 2003 by joining Purdue University's Department of Biology as a Visiting Scholar and worked there until 2004. In 2005, she joined the University of Florida, where she held multiple appointments, including serving as an assistant professor of Microbiology and Cell Science at the University of Florida from 2005 to 2012, and as an associate professor of Microbiology and Cell Science from 2012 to 2019. As of 2019, she is a Full Professor in Microbiology and Cell Science at the University of Florida and also holds a concurrent appointment as a Full Professor of Genetics and Genomes Graduate Program at the same institution.In 2024, she was appointed as an Assistant Director of the University of Florida Astraeus Space Institute.

Foster was elected President of the American Society for Gravitational and Space Research in 2021.

== Research ==
Foster has authored publications spanning the areas of marine biology, microbial diversity, space biology, astrobiology, and microbial ecology, including articles in peer-reviewed journals.

=== Beneficial interactions between animals and microbes in microgravity ===
Foster's research on microbes' interaction with microgravity has contributed to the contemporary understanding of key mechanisms and factors that influence microbial behavior in space. Exploring the utility of using the squid-vibrio symbiosis model as a means to investigate the influence of microgravity on bacterial-induced animal development, her study suggested that this model is adaptable to experimental manipulation in a space environment and can offer significant insights into the role played by symbiotic bacteria in the natural development of animal tissues. While investigating the function of Hfq in an animal-microbe symbiosis during simulated microgravity conditions, she determined that simulated microgravity can impede the expression of Hfq, which plays an important role in the mutualistic association amongst V. fischeri and its animal host. In her assessment of host-microbe interactions in microgravity, it was revealed that microgravity conditions can disrupt these interactions, leading to a shift in the association towards pathogenicity and stressed the importance of comprehending microbial fitness under microgravity environments to uphold harmonious homeostasis between plants, humans, and their respective microbiomes during spaceflight.

Foster has designed and completed several spaceflight experiments that examine the effects of spaceflight on beneficial interactions between animals and microbes. She has had experiments aboard the last two space shuttle missions, STS-134 and STS-135, and most recently completed an experiment aboard SpaceX CRS-22.

=== Microbialites ===
Foster's research on microbialites has focused on the formation, structure, and ecological significance of these unique sedimentary deposits, shedding light on the diverse microbial communities that shape their development and the environmental conditions that support their growth. Her early research has uncovered the mechanisms underlying thrombolytic microbialite formation, while also identifying a unique microbial community composition predominantly dominated by bacteria from the Alphaproteobacteria taxa and Cyanobacteria, with a comparatively low diversity of eukaryotic microorganisms. In related research, her work investigated the mechanisms responsible for the formation of microbialites and the potential adaptations and modifications of their surrounding environment by these dynamic ecosystems while also identifying several general processes linked to mineral precipitation in various habitats. While examining the microbial diversity and Mineralogy in the Hypersaline Storr's Lake, her molecular analysis led to the identification of 12 dominant bacterial phyla and also established the presence of both aragonite and Mg-calcite in certain microbialite morphotypes using X-ray diffraction studies.

=== Stromatolite microbial diversity ===
Foster has conducted research on stromatolites, with a particular focus on their characterization and astrobiological implications. While examining the diversity of cyanobacteria composing stromatolites located in Highbourne Cay her work has provided insights into the microbial diversity and ecology of stromatolites and revealed that the genetic diversity of the cyanobacterial populations within the stromatolites exceeds prior estimates, thereby indicating that the mechanisms underlying stromatolite formation and accretion may be more intricate than previously assumed. Further, her study of present-day marine stromatolites in the Exuma Cays revealed diverse of microorganisms, whose spatial distribution appeared linked to the physical structure of the formations. She suggested that distinct microorganisms performed distinct functions, contributing to the precipitation of calcium carbonate and bind sediment particles. Her research on the microbial diversity in modern stromatolites highlighted the crucial role of metagenomic sequencing approaches in comprehending the molecular-level microbial diversity and functional complexity of these dynamic ecosystems, emphasizing that these approaches have facilitated a higher resolution characterization of stromatolite diversity and function.

== Awards and honors ==
- 2020 – Orr-Reynolds Service Award, American Society of Gravitational and Space Research
- 2021 – President's Award, American Society of Gravitational and Space Research
- 2025 - Elected Fellow, American Society for Gravitational and Space Research

== Selected articles ==
- Visick, K. L., Foster, J., Doino, J., McFall-Ngai, M., & Ruby, E. G. (2000). Vibrio fischeri lux genes play an important role in colonization and development of the host light organ. Journal of Bacteriology, 182(16), pages 4578–4586.
- Kolenbrander, P. E., Andersen, R. N., Blehert, D. S., Egland, P. G., Foster, J. S., & Palmer Jr, R. J. (2002). Communication among oral bacteria. Microbiology and molecular biology reviews, 66(3), pages 486–505.
- Foster, J. S., & Kolenbrander, P. E. (2004). Development of a multispecies oral bacterial community in a saliva-conditioned flow cell. Applied and environmental microbiology, 70(7), pages 4340–4348.
- Belcaid, M., Casaburi, G., McAnulty, S. J., Schmidbaur, H., Suria, A. M., Moriano-Gutierrez, S., ... & Nyholm, S. V. (2019). Symbiotic organs shaped by distinct modes of genome evolution in cephalopods. Proceedings of the National Academy of Sciences, 116(8), pages 3030–3035.
- Zamkovaya, T., Foster, J. S., de Crécy-Lagard, V., & Conesa, A. (2021). A network approach to elucidate and prioritize microbial dark matter in microbial communities. The ISME journal, 15(1), pages 228–244.
- Koch, E.J., Conesa, A., Garrett, T.J., Ormsby, R., Bohl, R., Reed, D.W. & Foster, J.S., 2026. Beneficial microbes mitigate molecular stress responses and accelerate developmental pathways in host animals during spaceflight. Frontiers in Space Technologies, 7, 1791484.
