= Ludwig Godenschweg =

German sculptor and etcher

Ludwig Godenschweg (9 November 1889 in Berlin – 2 December 1942 in Dresden) was a German sculptor and etcher. He studied under Robert Diez at the academy before leaving for military service. On his return he became Albiker's student. Schmidt called Goldenschweg's contribution to the third Secession exhibition "competent and promising" portrait bust, such as Wilhelm Rudolph (terra-cotta, c. 1923) and Volkmar Glaser, and small-scale works. His graphic prints Male Portrait and Nude were found as part of the Munich Art Hoard.

== See also ==
- List of German painters
