= Edward G. Ruby =

American microbiologist

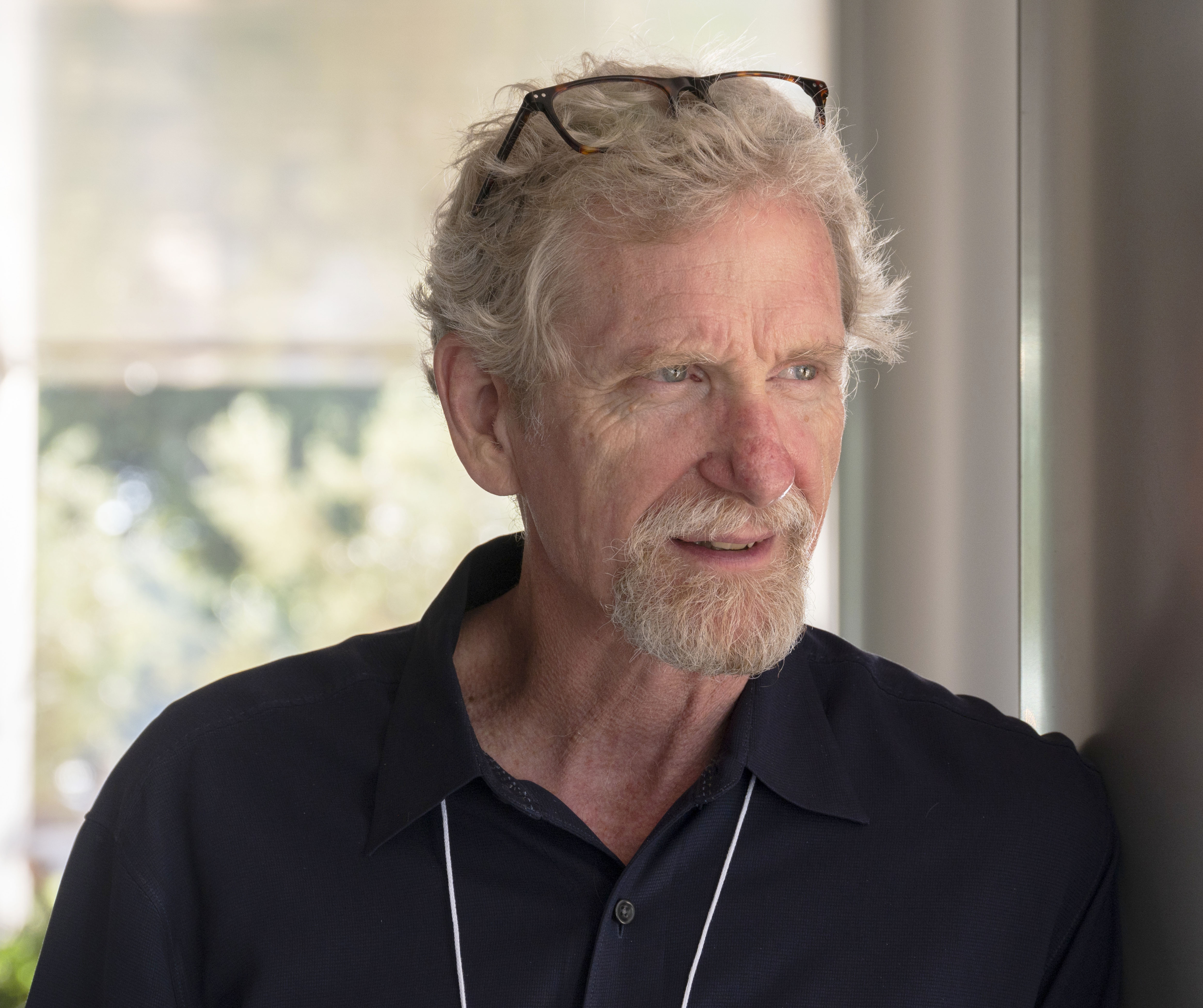
- Born: Edward G. Ruby
- Education: Stetson University (B.Sc.); University of California, San Diego (Ph.D.)
- Known for: Host-bacterial symbiosis Quorum sensing
- Scientific career
- Fields: Biology
- Workplaces: Caltech; Carnegie Institution for Science; University of Hawaiʻi at Mānoa; University of Wisconsin-Madison; University of Southern California
- Doctoral advisor: Kenneth H. Nealson
- Other academic advisors: J. Woodland Hastings; Holger W. Jannasch; Sydney C. Rittenberg
- Website: http://glowingsquid.org/

Edward G. Ruby is an American microbiologist best known for his foundational work on beneficial bacterial–host interactions, particularly the symbiotic relationship between the Hawaiian bobtail squid, Euprymna scolopes, and the bioluminescent bacterium Vibrio fischeri. His research helped transform the field of microbiology beyond its traditional focus on pathogenesis to encompass the study of beneficial microbial associations. Ruby is a Faculty Associate in Biology and Biological Engineering at the California Institute of Technology and a Visiting Scientist at the Carnegie Institution for Science. In 2024, he was elected a Fellow of the American Academy of Arts and Sciences.

== Early life and education ==
Ruby earned his Bachelor of Science degree in Biology and Chemistry from Stetson University in Florida. He went on to earn his Ph.D. in Marine Biology from the Scripps Institution of Oceanography at the University of California, San Diego), working under the supervision of Kenneth H. Nealson. His doctoral research focused on the symbiotic association between the luminous bacterium Photobacterium fischeri (now Vibrio fischeri) and the marine fish Monocentris japonica.

Ruby completed postdoctoral fellowships at Harvard University with J. Woodland Hastings in biochemistry, at the Woods Hole Oceanographic Institution with Holger W. Jannasch in microbiology, and at the University of California, Los Angeles with Sydney C. Rittenberg in microbiology.

== Career ==
Ruby began his independent academic career at the University of Southern California in 1982 as an Assistant Professor in the Department of Biological Sciences, where he was subsequently promoted to Associate Professor (1988) and Professor (1996). During this period, he began his early studies of the Vibrio fischeri–squid symbiosis and initiated a collaboration with animal developmental biologist and biochemist Margaret McFall-Ngai. Together, they published a landmark 1991 paper in Science demonstrating that symbiont recognition triggers morphogenesis in the host light organ, a finding that established the Euprymna scolopes–Vibrio fischeri system as a premier model for studying beneficial animal–bacterial interactions.

In 1996, Ruby and McFall-Ngai moved to the University of Hawaiʻi at Mānoa to take advantage of the proximity to the natural habitat of the Hawaiian bobtail squid. Ruby held the position of Professor and Senior Researcher at the Pacific Biomedical Research Center (later renamed the Pacific Biosciences Research Center). Ruby and McFall-Ngai built the infrastructure to breed and study the squid in the laboratory.

Ruby was recruited to the University of Wisconsin–Madison in 2004 as part of a "Symbiosis Cluster" hiring initiative, joining the Department of Medical Microbiology and Immunology. He served as Vice-Chair of the department (2005–2015) and as Acting Chair (2013), and held the Steenbock Chair in Microbiological Sciences (2013–2015). At Wisconsin, Ruby expanded the genetic and genomic toolkit for V. fischeri.

Ruby returned to the University of Hawaiʻi in 2015, again as Professor and Senior Researcher. He co-initiated and co-directed, and later directed, the NIH-funded Integrative Center for Environmental Microbiomes and Human Health (2018–2022).

In 2022, Ruby and McFall-Ngai relocated their laboratories to Caltech in Pasadena, California, as part of the Carnegie Institution for Science's move to the Caltech campus. Ruby is a Faculty Associate in the Division of Biology and Biological Engineering at Caltech and a Visiting Scientist at the Carnegie Institution's department of Biosphere Sciences and Engineering.

== Research ==
Ruby's career has been devoted to understanding how bacteria communicate with and benefit their animal hosts. His research focuses on several interconnected areas: the signaling mechanisms by which Vibrio fischeri colonizes the light organ of the Hawaiian bobtail squid; the population genetics and ecology of Vibrio–host associations; bacterial quorum sensing and chemotaxis; and the imaging and analysis of single-cell bacterial gene expression.

=== The squid–vibrio model system ===
Together with Margaret McFall-Ngai, Ruby developed the Euprymna scolopes–Vibrio fischeri association into one of the most extensively characterized models of beneficial animal–bacterial symbiosis. In this partnership, the squid harbors V. fischeri in a specialized light organ, where the bacteria produce bioluminescence that the squid uses for counter-illumination camouflage during nocturnal hunting. The symbiosis follows a daily rhythm: the bacteria reach peak luminescence at night, and each dawn the squid expels the majority of the bacterial population, which then regrows from a small remnant over the course of the day.

Ruby's laboratory developed the molecular genetic tools needed to study V. fischeri, including methods for mutagenesis, gene complementation, and the construction of reporter strains. In 2005, Ruby and collaborators published the first complete and fully closed genome sequence of V. fischeri, a milestone that greatly accelerated the identification of bacterial genes involved in colonization and symbiotic signaling.

=== Key discoveries ===
Over more than three decades, the Ruby and McFall-Ngai laboratories, together with their trainees, elucidated the step-by-step process by which the host selects and accommodates its bacterial partner. Major contributions include demonstrating that symbiont-derived signals, including lipopolysaccharide and peptidoglycan, drive developmental changes in host tissues; characterizing the daily transcriptional and metabolic rhythms that underlie the symbiosis; and uncovering the roles of quorum sensing, motility, and chemotaxis in colonization. Their work revealed how bacterial outer membrane vesicles, and in particular symbiont small RNAs they carry, trigger host development, and how the host immune system distinguishes beneficial from harmful bacteria, findings with broad implications for understanding the human microbiome.

Ruby's research has been published in leading journals including Nature, Proceedings of the National Academy of Sciences, Cell Host & Microbe, mBio, and PLOS Biology, with over 120 peer-reviewed articles. In an influential 2008 review in Nature Reviews Microbiology, Ruby synthesized the broader lessons that the squid–vibrio system offers for understanding how genetic interrogation of a natural symbiosis can reveal conserved principles of host–microbe dialogue.

== Notable trainees ==
- Karen Visick – Professor, Department of Microbiology and Immunology, Loyola University Chicago. Visick's postdoctoral research with Ruby identified roles for bioluminescence genes in host colonization and development. Her laboratory has become a leader in the study of V. fischeri biofilm formation and its role in symbiotic initiation.

== Honors and awards ==
- Fellow, American Academy of Arts and Sciences (2024)
- Chair of the Scientific Advisory Board, Max Planck Institute of Chemical Ecology, Jena, Germany (2022–present)
- Steenbock Chair in Microbiological Sciences, University of Wisconsin–Madison (2013–2015)
- EU/Marie Curie ITN Researcher, Max Planck Institute for Marine Microbiology, Bremen, Germany (2012–2015)
- Moore Distinguished Visiting Scholar, California Institute of Technology (2012–2013)
- Visiting Professor, HuaZhong University, P.R. China; State Administration of Foreign Experts (2013)
- Board of Governors, American Academy of Microbiology (2005–2013)
- Fellow, American Academy of Microbiology (2002)
- Senior Excellence in Research Award (co-recipient), University of Hawaiʻi (2002)
- Miescher-Ishida Prize (co-recipient), International Society for Endocytobiology (2000)
- Distinguished Alumnus Award, Stetson University (2000)

== Selected publications ==
- McFall-Ngai, M.J.; Ruby, E.G. (1991). "Symbiont recognition and subsequent morphogenesis as early events in an animal-bacterial symbiosis". Science. 254 (5037): 1491–1494. doi:10.1126/science.1675310.
- Ruby, E.G.; Urbanowski, M.; Campbell, J.; Dunn, A.; Faini, M.; Gunsalus, R.; Lostroh, P.; Lupp, C.; McCann, J.; Millikan, D.; Schaefer, A.; Stabb, E.; Stevens, A.; Visick, K.; Whistler, C.; Greenberg, E.P. (2005-03-01). "Complete genome sequence of Vibrio fischeri: a symbiotic bacterium with pathogenic congeners". Proceedings of the National Academy of Sciences. 102 (8): 3004–3009. Bibcode:2005PNAS..102.3004R. doi:10.1073/pnas.0409900102. ISSN 0027-8424. PMC 549523. PMID 15701695.
- Ruby, E.G. (2008). "Symbiotic conversations are revealed under genetic interrogation". Nature Reviews Microbiology. 6 (10): 752–762. doi:10.1038/nrmicro1958. ISSN 1740-1526. PMID 18820712.
- Mandel, M.J.; Wollenberg, M.S.; Stabb, E.V.; Visick, K.L.; Ruby, E.G. (2009-01-08). "A single regulatory gene is sufficient to alter symbiosis host range". Nature. 458 (7237): 215–218. Bibcode:2009Natur.458..215M. doi:10.1038/nature07836. ISSN 0028-0836. PMC 2713604. PMID 19129849.
- McFall-Ngai, M.; et al. (2013). "Animals in a bacterial world, a new imperative for the life sciences". Proceedings of the National Academy of Sciences. 110 (9): 3229–3236. doi:10.1073/pnas.1219807110. ISSN 0027-8424.
- Moriano-Gutierrez, S.; Bongrand, C.; Essock-Burns, T.; Wu, L.; McFall-Ngai, M.J.; Ruby, E.G. (2020). "The non-coding small RNA SsrA is released by Vibrio fischeri and modulates critical host responses". PLoS Biology. 18 (10) e3000934. doi:10.1371/journal.pbio.3000934. ISSN 1544-9173. PMC 7610718. PMID 33079421.
- Visick, K.L.; Stabb, E.V.; Ruby, E.G. (2021). "A lasting symbiosis: how Vibrio fischeri finds a squid partner and persists within its natural host". Nature Reviews Microbiology. 19 (10): 654–665. doi:10.1038/s41579-021-00555-4. ISSN 1740-1526.
