= Adolf Breymann =

German sculptor

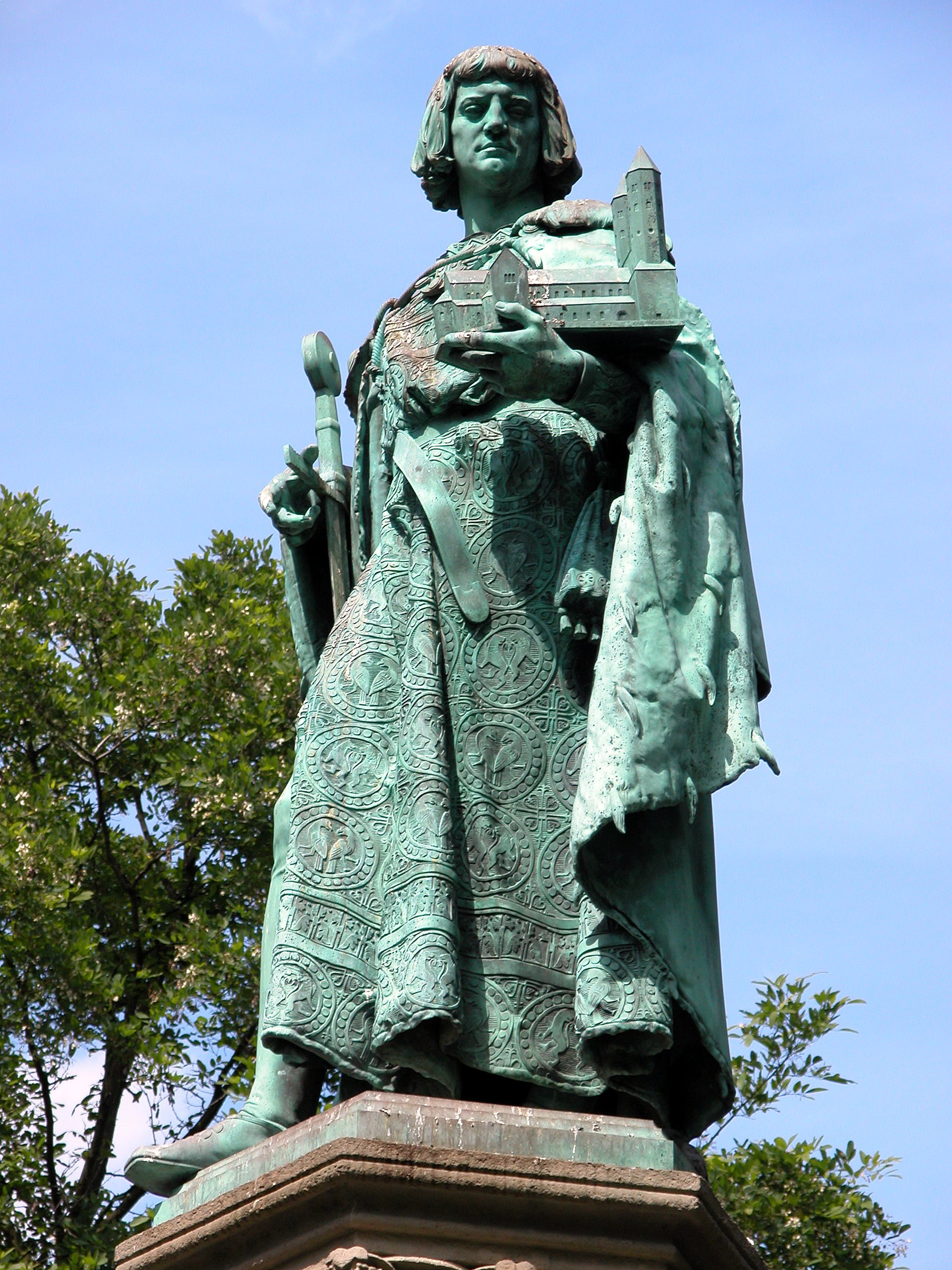
Henry the Lion statue on the "Heinrichsbrunnen" (fountain) in Braunschweig

Adolf August Wilhelm Breymann (16 June 1839, Bockenem – 1 September 1878, Wolfenbüttel) was a German sculptor.

== Life ==
Breymann's father was a pastor who, along with his fellow preachers, provided Adolf's earliest education. When his father was transferred to Watzum (near Wolfenbüttel), he entered the Gymnasium, where his artistic inclinations first expressed themselves. His father still desired a practical career for him and wanted him to study architecture, but he had no talent for mathematics.

Sculpture was their second choice, so he was apprenticed to Theodor Strümpell (1818–1890), the Royal Sculptor of Brunswick. In 1859, he went to the Dresden Academy of Fine Arts and continued his studies with Georg Ferdinand Howaldt. He entered the workshop of Johannes Schilling in 1861. After several years there, he was able to make a long-awaited study trip to Italy and remained for two years.

In 1873, his statue of Henry the Lion was awarded a Silver Medal at the Universal Exposition in Vienna. He personally supervised the installation of two angels he had designed for Prince Albert's Mausoleum at Frogmore House. In 1878, he was stricken with an incurable stomach ailment and was taken to his family's home in Wolfenbüttel, where he died shortly thereafter.

=== Other selected works ===
- Siegesdenkmal (Victory Monument), 1881, in Braunschweig, which was completed by Robert Diez after Breymann's death.
- Kriegerdenkmal (War Memorial), 1870/71 (unveiled 1876), in Göttingen on the Bahnhofstraße, by the "Alleetor".
