= TMAO reductase =

TMAO reductase may refer to:

- Trimethylamine N-oxide reductase
- Trimethylamine-N-oxide reductase (cytochrome c)
