= Casimirianum, Coburg =

School in Coburg, Bavaria, Germany

Coordinates: 50°15′25″N 10°57′56″E

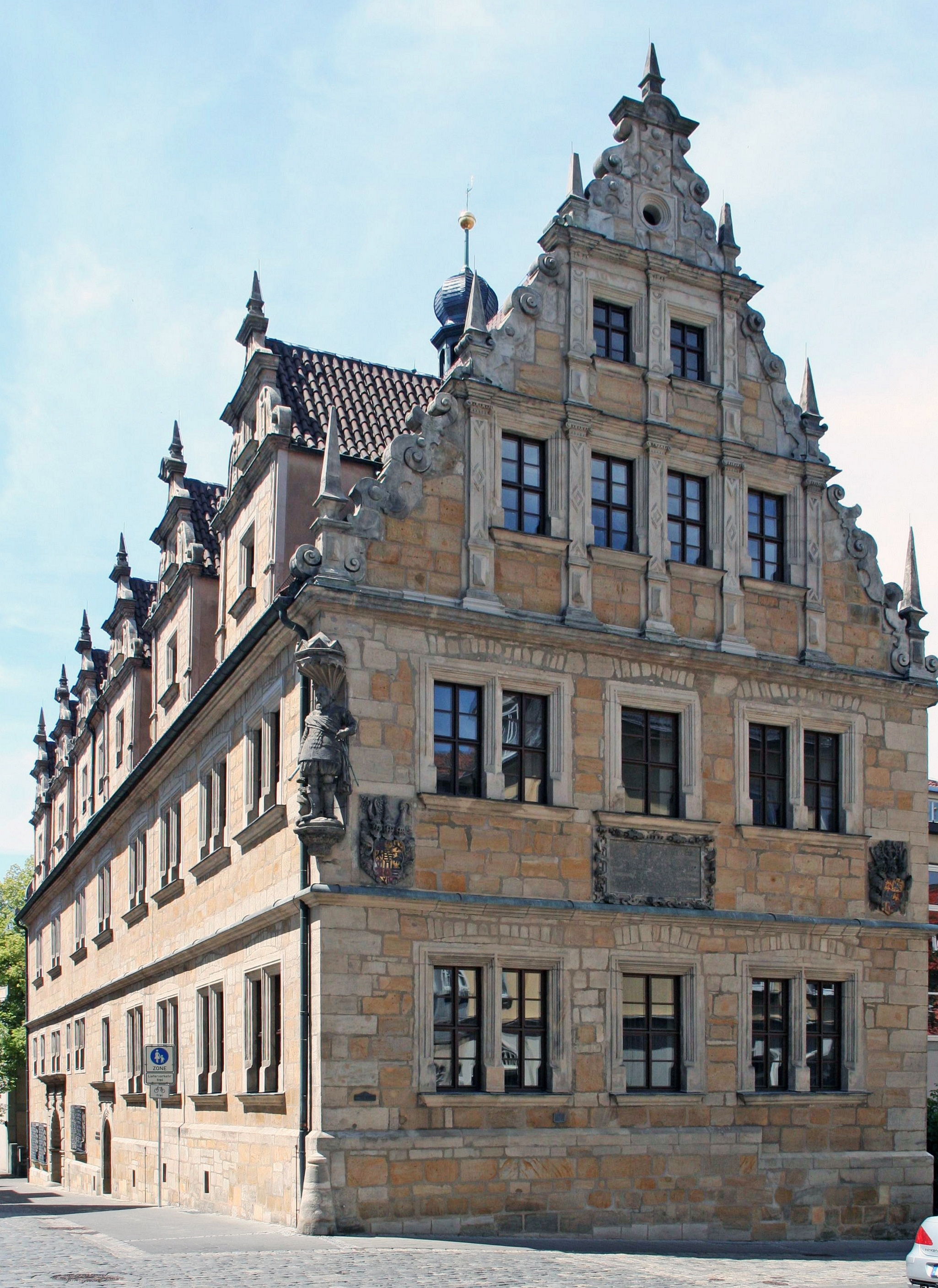
Renaissance style Casimirianum

The Casimirianum, known to the students as the "Casi", is a Gymnasium in Coburg, Bavaria. It was founded in 1605 by Johann Casimir, the Duke of Saxe-Coburg (1564–1633), and named after him. Today the Casimirianum is a linguistic and humanistic high school with the curriculum including Latin from 5th Grade, English from 6th Grade, and Italian, Greek, French or Spanish as the third compulsory foreign language. With the school year of 2009–10, the program was expanded with a scientific-technological branch with Latin as a second language. The Casimirianum was once involved with a German pilot program, "The European Gymnasium" and was one of 44 Model Schools of "MODUS21", but both programs were closed by 2009.

== History ==
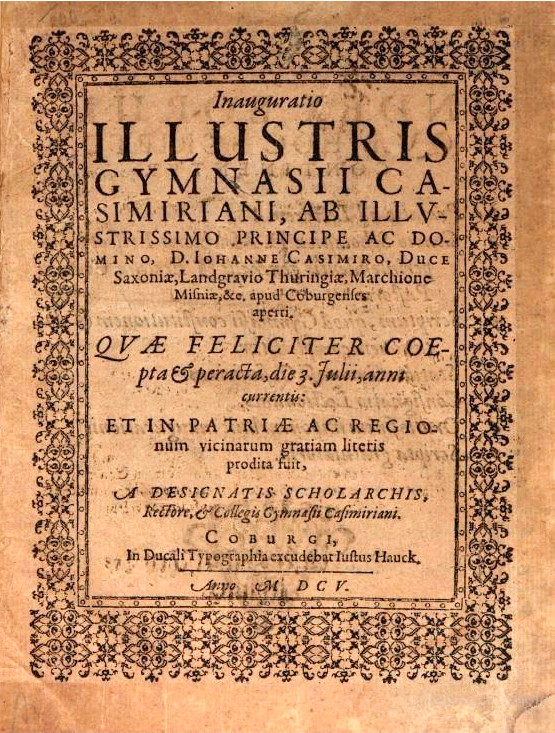
Inauguration program, dated 5 July 1605, for the Casimirianum

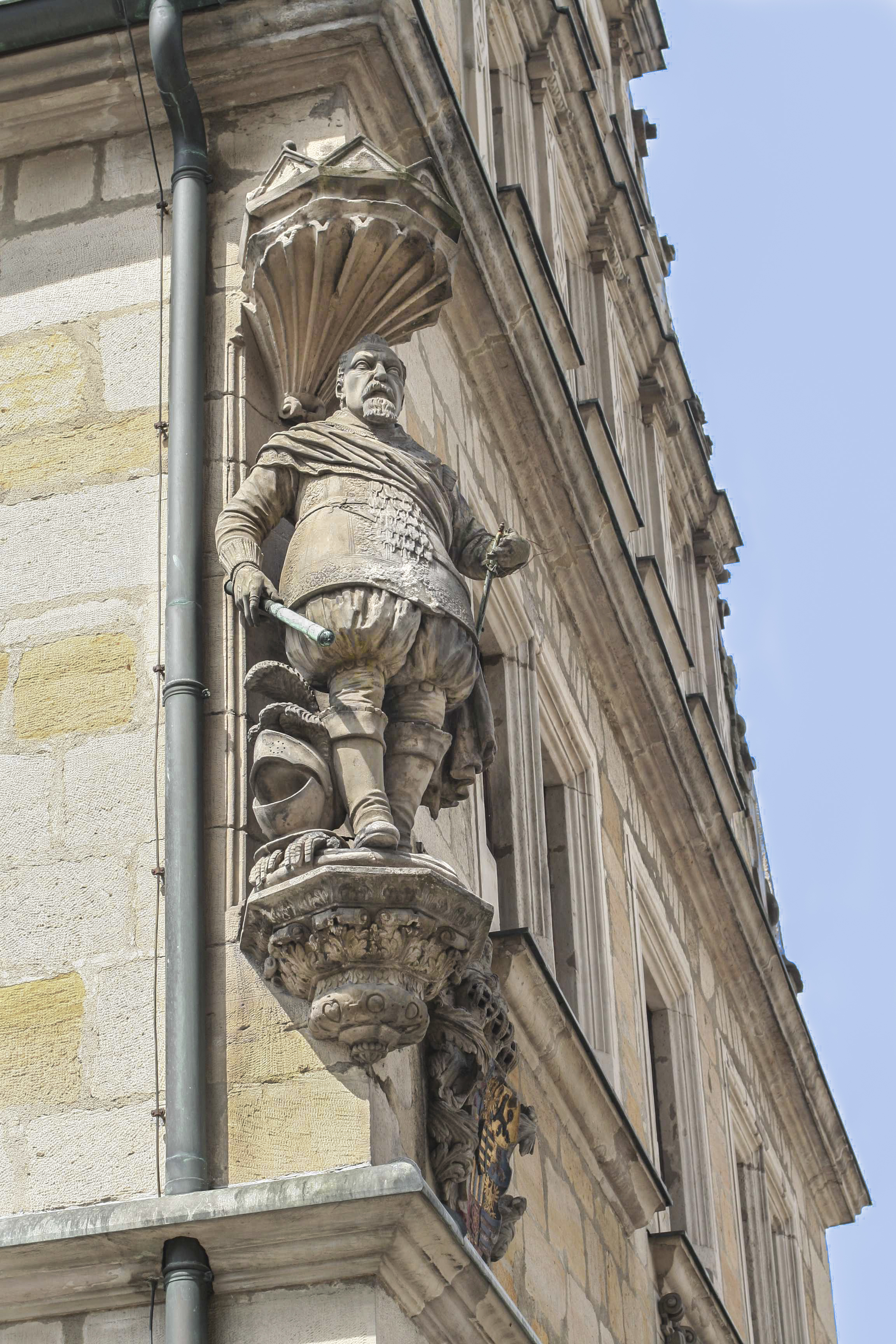
Statue of Duke Johann Casimir at the Casimirianum

The Casimirianum is a Renaissance building designed and built by Peter Sengelaub. On 2 September 1601, the foundation stone was laid by Duke Johann Casimir and he returned on 3 July 1605 the inauguration. According to the foundation charter, the Duke intended this state school to be ein medium oder Mittel (German, "a medium or middle") between a Trivialschule (an elementary school) and a high school or academy. The lectures were to be public et gratis (Latin, "free to the public"). A Convictorium (Latin, "boarding school") was established "with two tables, of twenty-four boys, one table free, and the other, for a weekly fee of 7 groschen by any person" The Duke understood "how sometimes . . . poor people's children, who are naturally good and capable of intelligence, and the same to seek and learn, are also eager to be educated, are often overlooked, ignored and neglected; that we would not like to hear or be heard in the least..."

From the Bewiddungsbrief (Letter of Evaluation) of Duke Johann Casimir, the Foundation Charter of the Casimirianum, dated 3 July 1605: "Undoubtedly, in the view of these regulations and foundation of our school, the praeceptores [Latin, "teachers"] held truly and abundantly, and the public lectures multiplied. Also the beneficium communis mensæ [Latin, "common good of the table"] must be properly conducted; it will follow and further such Christian work, to honor God, to edify Christendom, and to maintain our lands, with the time of good-hearted people and foremost our descendants, that it achieves the original goals intentionally."

On 11 November 1677 Emperor Leopold I granted the Imperial privilege to establish a new university in Coburg. In 1705, on the occasion of the centennial of the school, the University of Coburg was proclaimed. But, in 1723, it was abandoned because of the infighting among the seven participating Ernestine princes and of the lack of funding. So were the efforts of a joint committee for a second university for Jena. The Casimirianum Gymnasium has continued to use the original building, built in 1607.

== Architecture ==
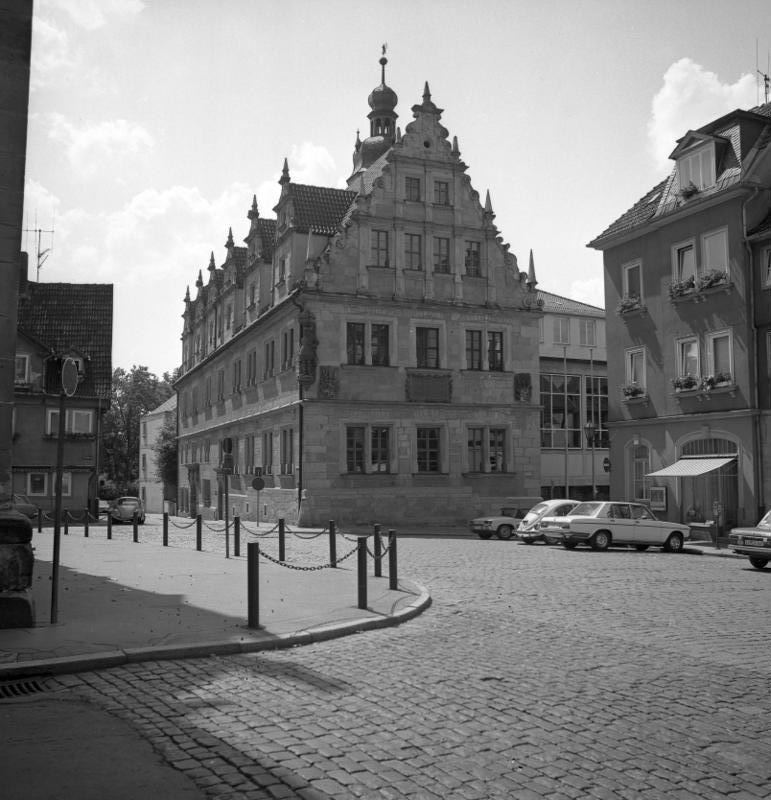
The Casimirianum of Coburg in 1975

Across the street from the Morizkirche (St. Maurice's Church), on the corner lot at Neugasse, Ratskornhaus, built in 1496, stood until 1601. Then Duke Johann Casimir had it razed and rebuilt. On this spot, in 1605, Nikolaus Bergner and Peter Sengelaub created a Hohe Schule mit Convictorium (high school with a dormitory). For Bergner, it was the second of his three buildings in Coburg. The construction of the government offices at Stadthaus and Rathaus on Marktplatz in the center of Coburg had just been finished, and it would be followed by the Zeughaus, now the State Archives of Coburg.

The two-story gable roof in the Renaissance style is outlined by a series of six spire lights with richly detailed edges and each of the spire lights is sloped as steep as a pyramid. Both three-story-tall ends of the gable roof are very ornately designed with barrettes of volutes and each of the five pyramids slopes to the bottom of the partitions. The three-to-eight window bays on the upper floors are designed as large windows with mullions; only the gable ends have only one window in the middle. The ground floor is bisected, approximately in the middle, by a portal with a sculptured arch, which consists of overlapping rods and this entablature with an architrave, a frieze and a cornice resting on the corbels. Left of this door is an entrance porch, with a low round arch supported by corbels with leaf volutes and topped with a cornice with a cymatium and a dentil. On the northeast corner, facing the church, at the level of the upper floor, is the stone figure of the school's founder, Duke Johann Casimir, replaced in 1638 by Veit Dümpel. Originally, the gable's face at the right side of the figure was painted with the images of famous scientists. In the middle of the roof, set on the top of the ridge, there is an outstanding polygonal stair-tower with a spiral staircase of stone, an onion dome and a lantern, from which the Gymnasium's little bell hangs. In the auditorium of the Gymnasium, there are wood panel paintings featuring the allegories of the Seven Virtues, which were discovered in the Muenzmeisterhaus Muenzmeisterhaus in 1957.

Over the course of four hundred years, many renovations and additions as well as the demolition of the surrounding townhouses created the present campus of the Gymnasium. The last enlargements 1961 were the construction of a gym with a recreation hall at the Neugasse and, between 1986 and 1988 and an additional school building with a music room in the direction of Ketschengasse.

== Traditions ==
At the end of each school year during the annual festival, the foundation of the stone figure of the school's founder Duke Johann Casimir is "crowned" at the corner of the Renaissance building of the school. A student in the upper third (in terms of their school performance) of the 12th Grade makes a speech. Then the speaker, along with the year's valedictorian, climbs up a ladder to the figure of the school's founder and lays a wreath on the keystone. Another wreath is attached to the arm of the former ruler. Then the students empty three consecutive glasses of beer (sometimes apple juice as a substitute), each time with the following Latin words Gymnasium Casimirianum Vivat, crescat, and floreat in aeternum (Translation: "Long live Casimirianum Gymnasium, may it grow and bloom forever") and throw them to the ground. The shards of the glasses are avidly collected by the students because they are supposed to bring them good luck and good grades in the next school year. In the festivities, the three-verse school song (melody: Vom hoh'n Olymp, From high Olympus) is also sung, the first two verses before the coronation, the last at the conclusion.

Since 1861, the Schülerverbindung Casimiriana (Casimirana Students Society), an independent and egalitarian fraternity for male students, has been connected with the higher grades at the Gymnasium.

== Notable former students ==
- Michael Erich Franck (1691–1621), novelist in the Rococo era, attended from 1709 to 1713
- Johann Caspar Goethe (1710–1782), father of Johann Wolfgang Goethe, attended from 1725 to 1728
- Johann Georg Meusel (1743–1820), historian, and lexico-bibliographer, attended from 1758 to 1764
- Friedrich Hofmann (1813–1888), writer, attended from 1828 to 1834
- August Schleicher (1821–1868), linguist and pioneer of Indo-European Studies, attended from 1835 to 1839
- Bernhard Fischer (1852–1915), attended from 1862 to 1871
- Richard Leutheußer (1867–1945), lawyer and politician, graduated 1887
- Hans Berger (1873–1941), a neurologist and psychiatrist, graduated 1892
- Samuel Friedrich Diez (1803–1873, court painter
- Constant Griebel (1876–1965), food chemist, attended from 1886 to 1893
- Helmuth Johnsen (1891–1947), an Evangelical Lutheran bishop, populist and activist, graduated 1911
- Georg Hansen (1904–1944), resistance fighter of 20 July 1944, attended from 1914 to 1923
- Hans Morgenthau (1904–1980), a lawyer and political scientist, attended from 1914? to 1923
- Peter von Butler (1913–2010), Lieutenant General (Ret.) in the Bundeswehr, graduated 1931
- Michael Stoschek, chairman of Brose GmbH & Co. KG, attended from 1957 to 1967
- Thomas Keyßner, lawyer and local politician, attended from 1966 to 1975
- Norbert Kastner, lawyer and mayor of Coburg from 1990 until 2014, attended from 1970 to 1979
- Heinrich Bedford-Strohm, Evangelical Lutheran bishop from Bavaria, graduated 1979
- Carl-Christian Dressel, politician and university professor, attended from 1980 to 1989

== Notable teachers ==
- Andreas Libavius (1555–1616), alchemist who wrote one of the first chemistry textbooks
- Johann Matthäus Meyfart (1590–1642), professor since 1617, director since 1623 fought as Protestant theologian against the persecution of witches
- Johann Christoph Kohlhans (1604–1677), author of writings on Greek and Hebrew as well as mathematics and physics
- Erdmann Rudolf Fischer (1687–1776), Lutheran theologian
- Ernst Salomon Cyprian (1673–1745), 1700–1713 director, Lutheran theologian, opponent of Pietism
- Johann Friedrich Gruner (1723–1778), Lutheran theologian, historian, orator and teacher
- Johann Christoph Matthias Reinecke (1768–1818), geologist, geographer and cartographer

== Quotations ==
He had spent his youth at the Coburg Gymnasium, which among German schools took one of the first places. He was placed on a good foundation there in the languages, and what else was expected of a learned education...

Johann Wolfgang von Goethe on his father Johannes Caspar Goethe, cited from Aus meinem Leben, Dichtung und Wahrheit, Erstes Buch, p. 21, line 31 and p. 22, lines 1–4, from the English translation by John Oxenford, The Autobiography of Goethe: Truth and Poetry, From My Own Life (London: Henry G. Bohn, 1848), p. 20)

== Bibliography ==
- (in Latin and German) Johann Casimir, Duke of Saxe-Coburg, Chapter 4: “Scriptum Qvod Gymnasii Constitutionem et Dotationem continet” [Latin: Written List containing the Constitution and Endowment of the Gymnasium]; In: Inauguratio Illustris Gymnasii Casimiriani ab Illvstrissimo Principe Ac Domino D. Iohanne Casimiro, Duce Saxoniae, Landgravio Thuringiae, Marchione Misniae, &c. apud Coburgenses aperti. Quae Feliciter Coepta & peracta die 3. Julii, anni currentis Et In Patriae Ac Regionum vicinarum gratiam literis prodita fuit, A Designatis Scholarchis, Rectore & Collegis Gymnasii Casimiriani [Latin: From the Inauguration of the Illustrious Casimirianum Gymnasium by the Illustrious Prince and Lord Duke Johann Casimir, Duke of Saxony, Landgrave of Thuringia, Margrave of Meissen, etc., and opened in Coburg, Which Happily Began and ended on the third of July in the current year And in the Country and neighboring Regions, for which the program was produced And Designed by Scholars, Rector & Faculty of the Casimirianum Gymnasium] (Coburg: Justus Hauck, 1605)
- (in German) Festausschuss [Festival Committee], ed., Festschrift zum 350jährigen Bestehen des Gymnasium Casimirianum Coburg [Festival Program of the 350th Anniversary of the Casimirianum Gymnasium of Coburg] (Coburg: [“Riemann in Komm.”,] 1955)
- (in German) Rudolf Brückner, ed., Casimiriana 1861 - 1961, Hundert Jahre einer Schülerverbindung [Casimiriana 1861 - 1961, One Hundred Years of a Student Society] (Coburg: Altherren-Verband der Casimiriana Coburg e. V. [Old Boys Association of the Casimiriana of Coburg, Inc.], 1961)
- (in German) Norbert Enser and Rudolf Brückner, eds., 125 Jahr Casimiriana: die Geschichte der Casimiriana und das Leben der Aktivitas einst und jetzt [125 Years of the Casimiriana and the Life of the Brothers Then and Now] (Coburg: Altherren-Verband der Casimiriana Coburg e. V., 1986)
- (in German) Joachim Goslar and Wolfgang Tasler, eds., Musarum Sedes: 1605 - 2005, Festschrift zum 400-jährigen Bestehen des Gymnasiums Casimirianum Coburg [(in Latin) “Seat of the Muses”: (in German) 1605 - 2005, Festival Program for the 400th Anniversary of the Casimirianum Gymnasium of Coburg] (Coburg: Gymnasium Casimiranium, 2005) ISBN 3-9810350-0-3
- (in German) Gymnasium Casimirianum and Schülerverbindung Casimiriana, eds., Casimirianum - Casimiriana : Festgabe der Schülerverbindung Casimiriana zu Coburg zum 400. Schulstiftungsfest des Gymnasiums Casimirianum zu Coburg [Casimirianum - Casimiriana: Festival Program of the Casimiriana Students Society of Coburg for the 400th Anniversary of the Foundation of the Casimirianum Gymnasium of Coburg] (Coburg: Altherren-Verband der Casimiriana Coburg e. V., 2005; Würzburg: Studentengeschichtliche Vereinigung des Coburger Convents [The Coburger Convent, Historical Society of the Students], 2005) ISBN 3-930877-39-2
- (in German) Peter Morsbach, Otto Titz: Stadt Coburg. Ensembles-Baudenkmäler-Archäologische Denkmäler. Denkmäler in Bayern. Band IV [City of Coburg. Assembled Monuments and Archaeological Monuments. Monuments in Bavaria. Volume IV], p. 48. (Munich: Karl M. Lipp Verlag, 2006) ISBN 978-3-874-90590-9
- (in German) Silvia Pfister, ”Bedeutende Gelehrte aus dem Casimirianum” [Prominent Teachers from the Casimirianum], In: ”Ausstellung: Bibliotheca Casimiriana’ [Exhibition: The Casimiriana Library], Landesbibiliothek Coburg.de [State Library of Coburg] (LBC). Retrieved 4 February 2013.
