= Georg Ferdinand Howaldt =

German sculptor

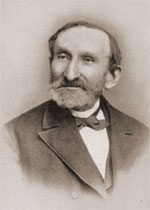
- Born: 8 April 1802; Braunschweig
- Died: 19 January 1883 (aged 80); Braunschweig
- Occupation: Sculptor

Georg Ferdinand Howaldt (8 April 1802 – 19 January 1883) was a German sculptor.

== Biography ==
Howaldt was born in Braunschweig as the son of the silversmith David Ferdinand Howaldt. He learned silversmithing and went to Nuremberg, where he became friends with the sculptor Jacob Daniel Burgschmiet, who convinced him to change to modelling and sculpture. He became a teacher in modelling there and continued teaching modelling when he returned to Braunschweig in 1836. The success out of his cooperation with the famous sculptor Ernst Rietschel allowed him to start his own foundry casting sculptures for many known German sculptors of the nineteenth century. Since 1863 he was professor at the Collegium Carolinum zu Braunschweig, today TU Braunschweig. Howaldt died in Braunschweig. His son Hermann Heinrich Howaldt, also a sculptor, had joined him and continued his work and the foundry under Howaldt & Sohn until his own death.

His brother August Howaldt was in 1838 the founder of the German shipyard Howaldtswerke in Kiel.

== Bronze castings ==
- Quadriga with the Brunswick goddess Brunonia at Braunschweig castle, sculpted by Ernst Rietschel
- Lessing - Memorial for Braunschweig sculpted by Rietschel
- Angels for the grave of Prince Albert in the Frogmore Mausoleum sculpted by Adolf Breymann
- Memorial Alexander von Humboldt sculpted by Gustav Blaeser, Central Park, Manhattan
- Equestrian sculpture of Friedrich Wilhelm (Brunswick and Lüneburg) sculpted by Ernst Julius Hähnel
- Equestrian sculpture of Karl Wilhelm Ferdinand, Duke of Brunswick-Luneburg for Braunschweig sculpted by Franz Pönninger, Vienna

== Gallery ==
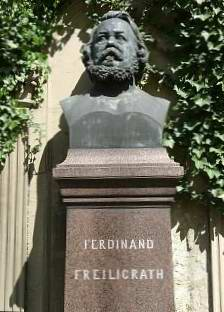
Freiligrath memorial and grave in Bad Cannstatt

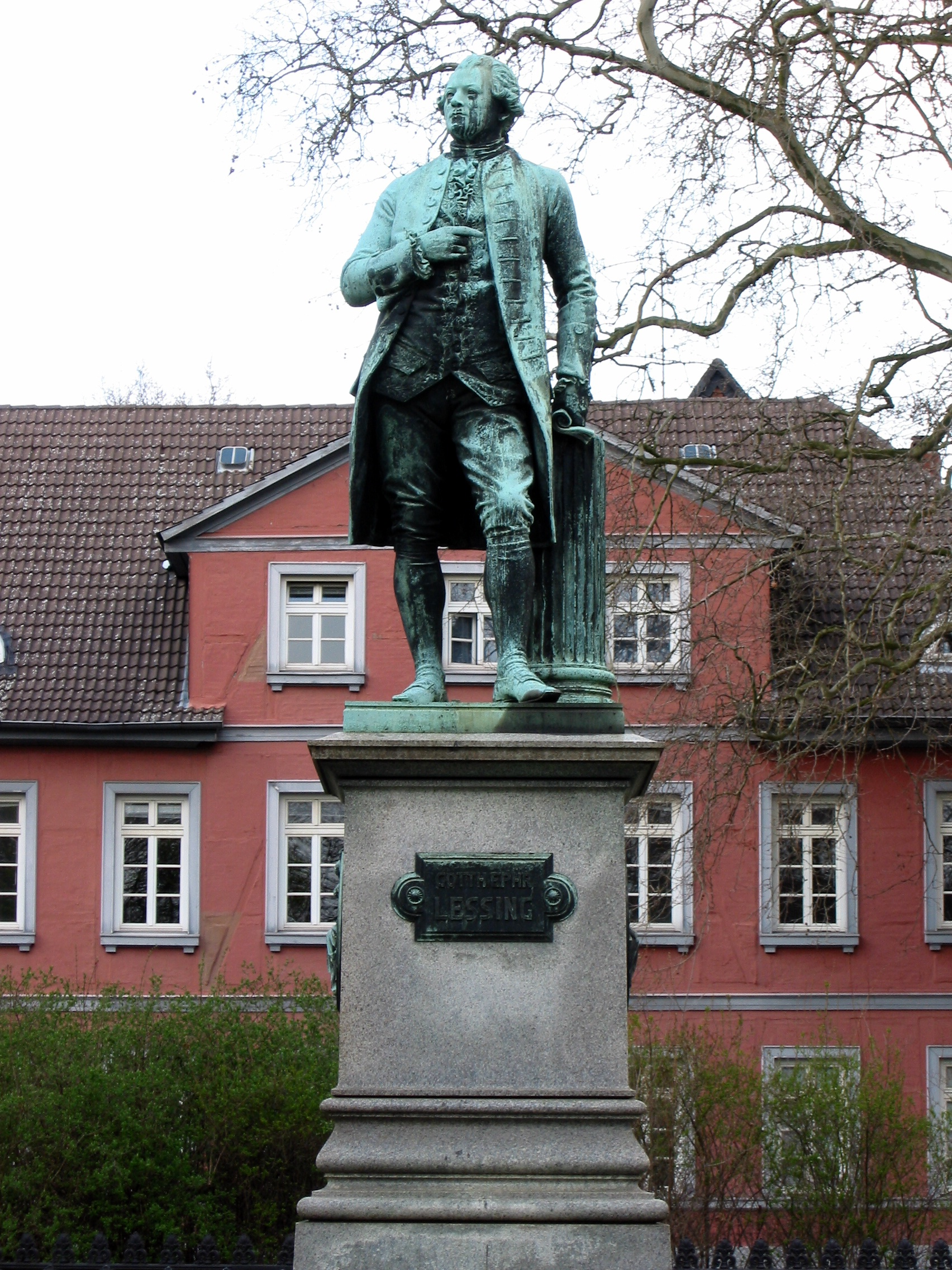
Lessing memorial in Braunschweig

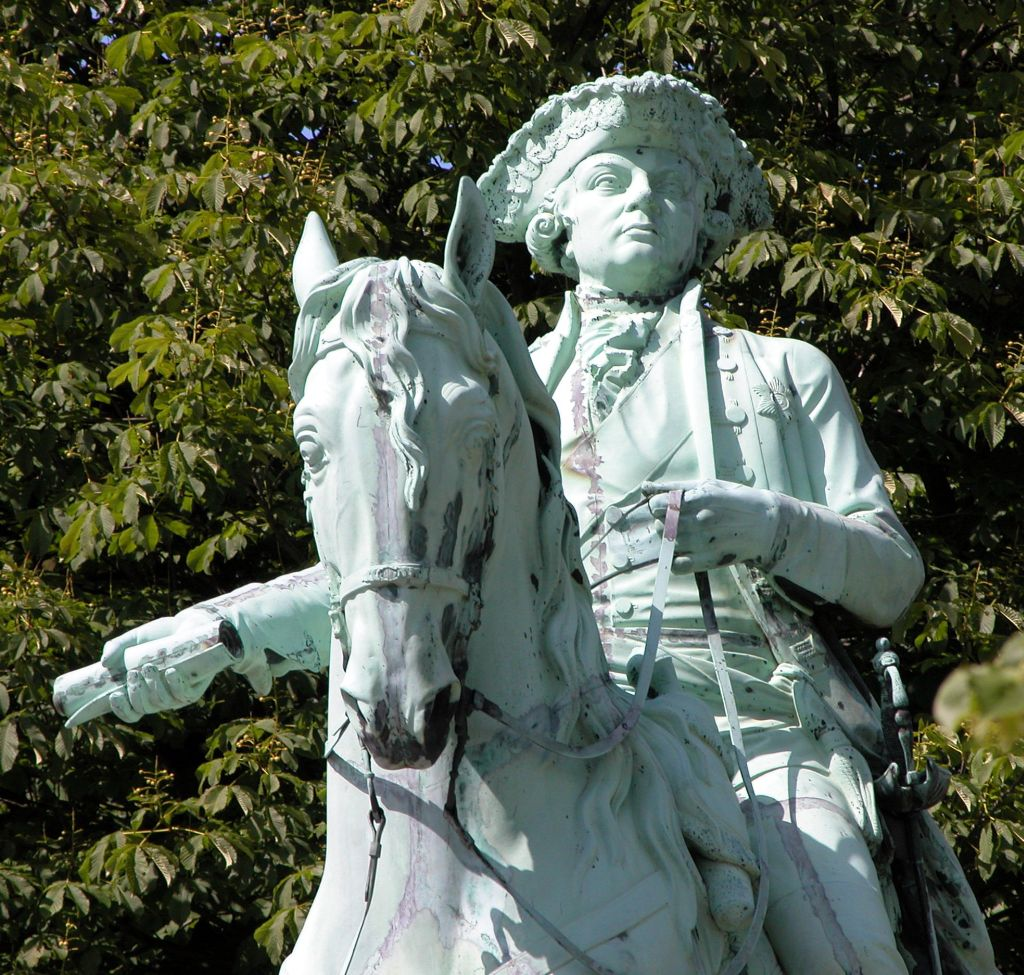
Equestrian of Karl Wilhelm Ferdinand, Duke of Brunswick-Luneburg in Braunschweig

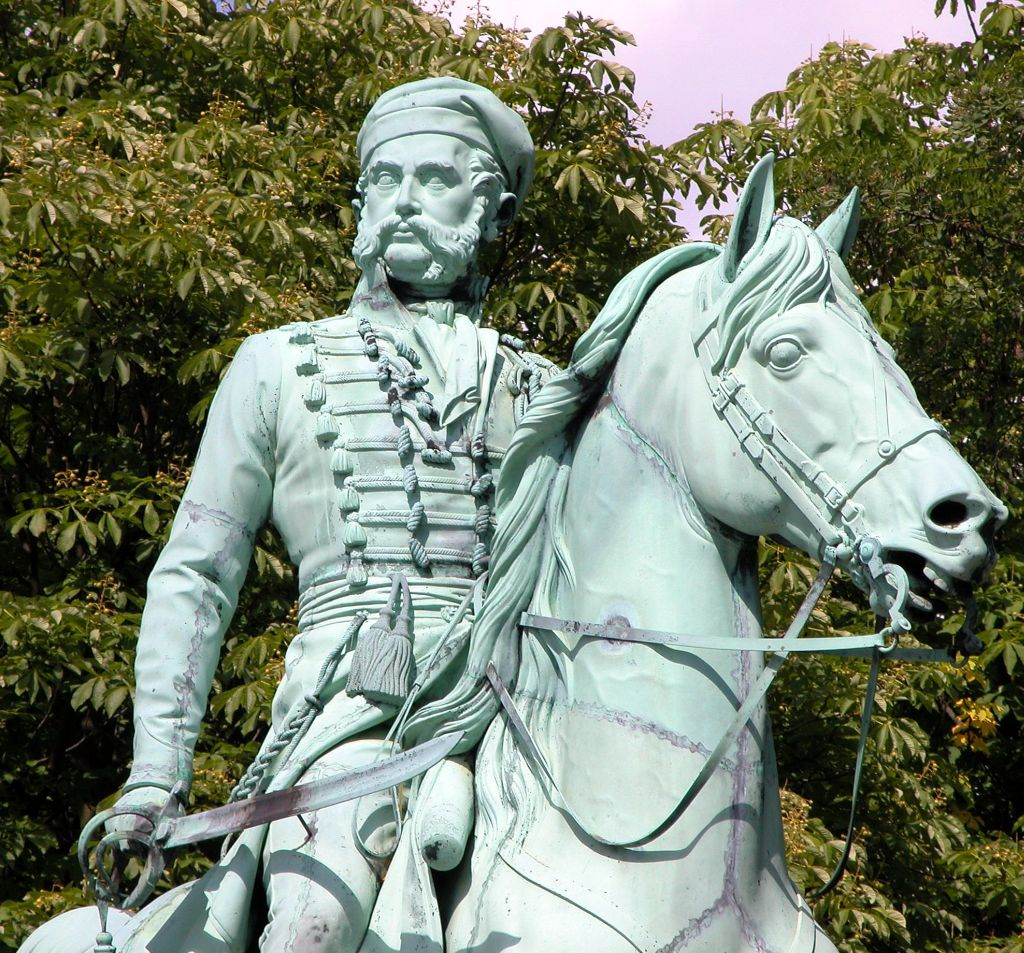
Equestrian of Duke Friedrich Wilhelm (Brunswick and Lüneburg) in Braunschweig

== See also ==
- German inventors and discoverers
