= Karen Visick =

American microbiologist

- Born: Karen Gillen
- Education: University of Washington
- Known for: Bacterial biofilm and symbiosis
- Awards: American Academy of Microbiology (2016)
- Scientific career
- Workplaces: Loyola University Chicago Stritch School of Medicine
- Website: ssom.luc.edu/microbio/people/faculty/karenvisickphd/

Karen Visick is an American microbiologist and expert in bacterial genetics known for her work on the role of bacteria to form biofilm communities during animal colonization. She conducted doctoral research with geneticist Kelly Hughes at the University of Washington, where she identified a key regulatory checkpoint during construction of the bacterial flagellum. She conducted postdoctoral research on development of the Vibrio fischeri-Euprymna scolopes symbiosis with Ned Ruby at University of Southern California and University of Hawaiʻi. The bacteria are bioluminescent and provide light to the host. Visick and Ruby revealed that bacteria that do not produce light exhibit a defect during host colonization.

Visick has been a professor at Stritch School of Medicine since 1998, where she continues her work on Vibrio fischeri. She identified and has characterized bacterial biofilm formation as a key factor required for colonization of the animal host. She identified a regulator that is critical for host colonization and called it Regulator of Symbiotic Colonization Sensor, RscS. She proceeded to identify an 18-gene locus that encoded functions for extrapolysaccharide production, which she named the Symbiosis Polysaccharide, Syp. The Visick Lab proceeded to determine that RscS is a key regulator of the syp EPS genes, and this system regulates bacterial biofilm formation and aggregation in host tissue during the initiation of the symbiosis. The lab has proceeded to characterize the regulation and function of the biofilm.

Visick was the co-organizer (Jean-Marc Ghigo was lead organizer) of the Biofilms 2018 conference in Washington, DC, which had over 500 attendees, and is the lead organizer of the Biofilms 2021 conference.

== Honors and awards ==
In 2016, Visick was elected as a fellow of the American Academy of Microbiology.
