= Samuel Friedrich Diez =

German portrait painter (1803–1873)

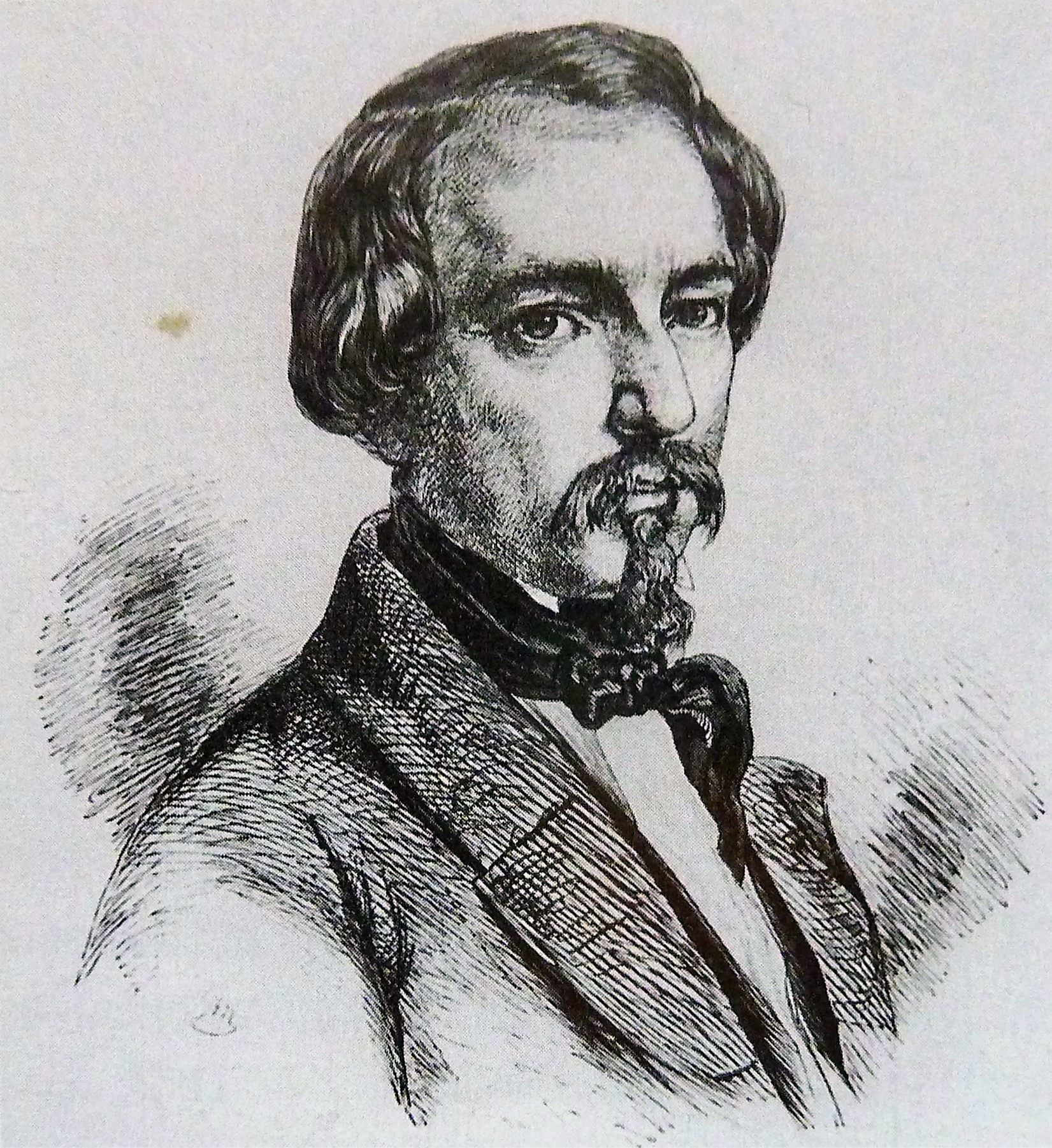
- self portrait, 1830
- Born: 19 December 1803; Neuhaus am Rennweg, Saxe-Meiningen; Holy Roman Empire
- Died: 11 March 1873 (aged 69); Meiningen, Saxe-Meiningen; German Empire
- Known for: Painting

Samuel Friedrich Diez ( 19 December 1803 – 11 March 1873) was a German portraitist and court official. He served as court painter to Georg II, Duke of Saxe-Meiningen. An influential artist in royal courts across Europe, he was made Honorary Designer of His Majesty The King of the Belgians by Leopold I of Belgium. Diez also served in a political role at court, and was appointed as a Privy Councillor by Heinrich LXVII, Prince Reuss Younger Line.

== Biography ==
Diez was born on 19 December 1803 in Neuhaus am Rennweg, Duchy of Saxe-Meiningen to a patrician family. His father, Jakob Diez, was a bailiff in Neuhaus. Diez was the uncle of the sculptor Robert Diez. He was educated at Casimirianum Coburg in Coburg, Bavaria. In 1824 he enrolled as a student at the Munich Academy of Fine Arts, where he studied painting and portraiture.

In 1832 Diez was brought to the royal court in Meiningen by Georg II, Duke of Saxe-Meiningen to work as a painter. In 1833 he was officially appointed as court painter. While serving as court painter, he became well known around the empire for his portraits. He painted at the royal courts of Coburg, Gotha, Weimar, Reuss, and Munich as well as courts in Brussels, Paris, London, Stockholm, and St. Petersburg.

In 1853 Diez was appointed as Honorary Designer of His Majesty The King of the Belgians by Leopold I of Belgium. In 1858 Diez was appointed as a Geheimrat, or privy councilor, by Heinrich LXVII, Prince Reuss Younger Line.

Diex created the Marienbild in der Haßfurtschlucht, a Catholic pilgrimage site and shrine in 1867.

Some of his notable works include portraits of Karl August Varnhagen von Ense, Bernhard II, Duke of Saxe-Meiningen, Christian Daniel Rauch, Leopold I of Belgium, and Ludwig Bechstein.

Diez died from complications related to a heart condition on 11 March 1873.
