= Microtox bioassay =

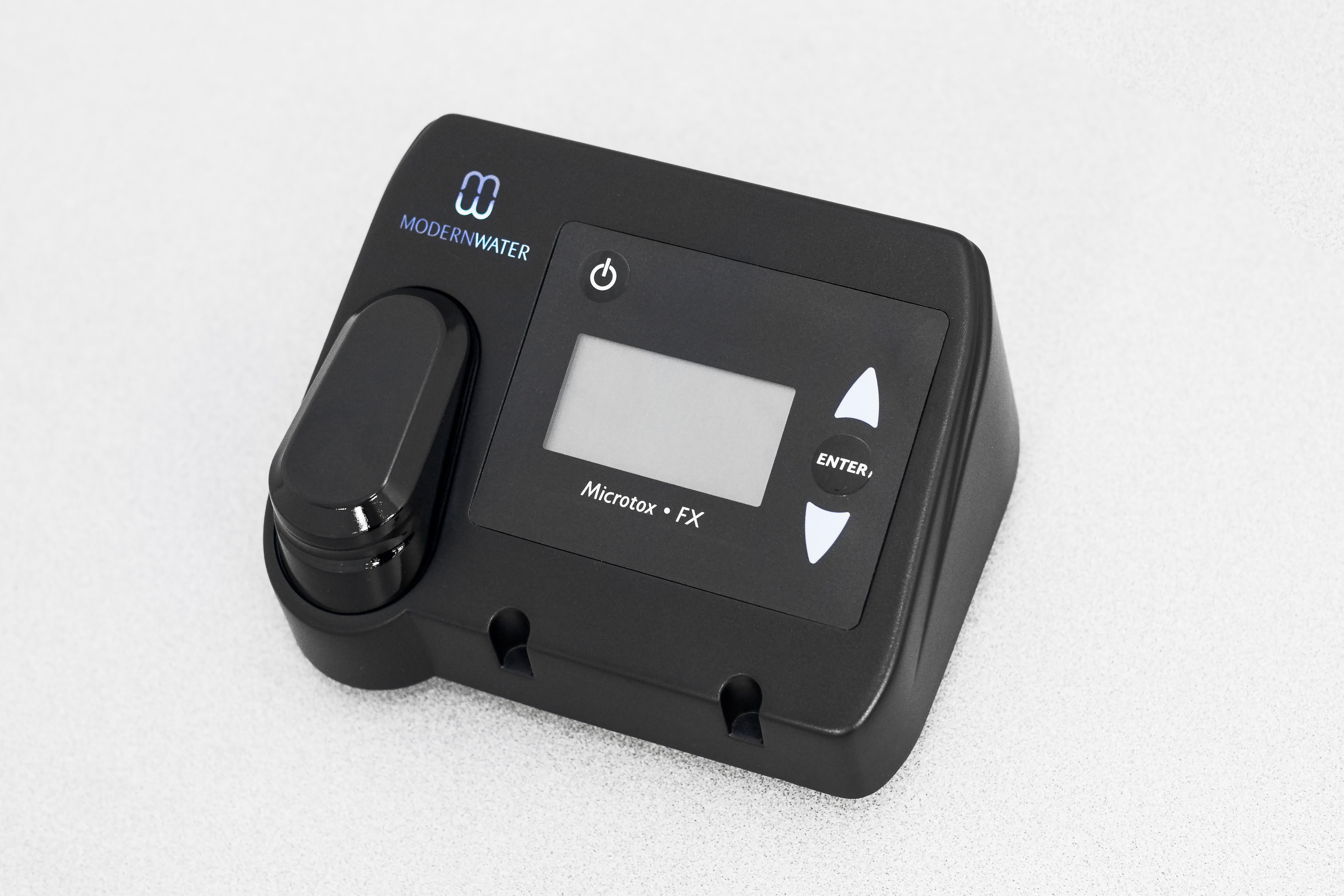
Microtox FX

Microtox is an in vitro testing system which uses bioluminescent bacteria (Allivibrio fischeri, formerly known as Vibrio fischeri) to detect toxic substances in different substrates such as water, air, soils and sediments. Allivibrio fischeri are non-pathogenic, marine, bacteria that luminesce as a natural part of their metabolism. When exposed to a toxic substance, the respiratory process of the bacteria is disrupted, reducing light output. Allivibrio fischeri have demonstrated high sensitivity across a wide variety of toxic substances. Response to toxicity is observed as a change in luminescence, which is a by-product of cellular respiration. This change can be used to calculate a percent inhibition of Allivibrio fischeri that directly correlates to toxicity.

== Background ==
Microtox was developed by Azur Environmental (formerly Microbics Corporation) in 1979 as a cost-effective alternative to toxicity tests available at the time. Prior to Microtox, the majority of toxicity tests available for water specifically focused on fish and daphnids. Since its inception, Microtox has become a standard method for testing the toxicity of water as well as other substrates such as soils and sediments.

In recent years the Microtox technology and name have undergone various different ownerships. In 2011, Microtox and related technologies was acquired by Modern Water from Strategic Diagnostics Incorporated (SDIX) for approximately $4.5 million. Prior to SDIX, Microtox was owned by its original developers Azur Environmental.

Microtox utilizes a bioluminescent bacteria (Allivibrio fischeri) to determine the toxicity of a particular substance and/or substrate. During cellular metabolism, these bacteria naturally emit light as a part of cellular respiration, which can be measured as luminescence. When exposed to toxic substances, a decrease in luminescence can be observed and percent change in luminescence can be directly correlated to toxicity. Allivibrio fischeri were specifically chosen, as these bacteria could be preserved by freeze-drying to increase shelf life and use. Both solid phase (soils and sediment) and aqueous acute toxicity testing (described below) can be conducted using this technology.

== Materials ==
=== Analysers ===
The Microtox Model 500 is a laboratory-based photometer that measures acute toxicity. This analyser is a temperature-controlled, self-calibrating biosensor measuring system that uses the bioluminescence of Allivibrio fischeri to determine the toxicity of contaminated water, or elutriates of contaminated soils and sediments.

Microtox Continuous Toxicity Monitor (CTM) is a site-specific Microtox analyser that continuously measures the toxicity of a water source and provides results instantly. This fully automatic analyser has a broad detection range that can identify several thousand contaminants simultaneously whether or not there is knowledge of the source of contamination. This device has the ability to run continuously for up to 4 weeks, and is easy to operate and maintain.

The DeltaTox II is a portable instrument that can be used to conduct acute toxicity and adenosine triphosphate (ATP) testing. Also known as the portable version of the Microtox Model 500, this device provides simple testing, uses small sample sizes, and is a cost-effective approach to analyzing water samples. This sensitive and rapid testing analyser has the ability to detect microbial contamination, as well as more than 2,700 different chemicals.

=== Reagent and solutions ===
==== Microtox model 500 and Microtox FX ====
The shelf life for the Acute Reagent is two years and for the solutions is three years when stored properly.

Microtox Acute Reagent is a freeze-dried culture of Allivibrio fischeri that is reconstituted prior to testing. It is recommended that the reagent be used within three hours of reconstitution. The sensitivity of the reagent may become altered after the recommended time period.

Microtox Osmotic Adjustment Solution (MOAS) is a nontoxic solution that is made up of 22% sodium chloride (NaCl) and ultra-pure water. This solution is added to a sample to adjust the osmotic pressure to approximately 2% NaCl.

Reconstitution Solution consists of specially prepared, nontoxic ultra-pure water.

Diluent is a nontoxic solution that is made up of 2% NaCl in ultra-pure water. This solution is used for diluting the sample and the reagent, and also provides osmotic protection that is required by Allivibrio fischeri.

== Methods ==
=== Preparation of samples ===
Microtox can be applied to a variety of matrices including drinking water, stormwater runoff, effluent, industrial discharges, soils and sediments. Most samples do not require special preparation before testing besides adjusting the salinity to 2%. However, samples that have certain characteristics, such as high turbidity levels, may require special preparation. If samples require a salinity adjustment to lower the salinity, this can be accomplished by adding an appropriate amount of Microtox Osmotic Adjusting Solution to dilute the sample. For example, adding 0.1 mL of MOAS to 1 mL of sample would result in a dilution of 90.9% of the original concentration. If a greater salinity is required, this can be accomplished by dissolving solid sodium chloride in the sample to achieve a final salinity of 2% for the protection of Allivibrio fischeri. Highly turbid samples that contain particulate matter will be required to settle before the test can be conducted. Particulate matter in the sample can interfere with bioluminescence by absorbing light and give misleading test results. Interference of luminescence can also occur with samples which are highly colored (particularly red, brown or black). It may be necessary to centrifuge samples to obtain an acceptable clarity for the test. If samples contain chlorine, this may alter the toxicity to Allivibrio fischeri and also give misleading results. The samples can be de-chlorinated using a sodium thiosulphate and deionized water solution that does not affect test results. Ideally, the pH of samples should not be modified since it is preferable to test each sample at the original pH level. However, if it is necessary to adjust the pH this should be done by adding either sodium hydroxide solution or hydrochloric acid to the sample.

Unlike water samples, soil and sediment samples are not homogeneous. As a result, it is difficult to obtain representative samples from such matrices. Toxic substances are likely to bind to particulate matter, and the extent to which toxic materials bind depends on the composition of the particles. For example, smaller particles such as clay tend to tightly bind to chemicals, acting like ion exchange resins. Microtox tests for sediment and soil differ in the way the matrix is prepared for contact with Allivibrio fischeri. To obtain a representative soil or sediment sample, it is necessary to conduct an elutriate test. Sediment elutriates can be prepared through extraction with either distilled water, saline water, or an organic solvent such as methylene chloride, or hexane. To run an elutriate test a soil sample is mixed with an extractant for a period of time, then allowed to settle and a sample is taken from the extract. If particulate matter is in the sample that was collected, it may be necessary to centrifuge the sample for optimal clarity. Additionally, the pore water of sediments can be collected by centrifugation and tested without extraction.

=== Procedures ===
There are five major Microtox tests including the Basic Test, the 100% Test, the Solid Phase Test, the Comparison Test, and the Inhibition Test. Of these five tests, three are used for sediment and soil testing including the Basic Test, the 100% Test and the Solid-Phase Test. All of these versions follow the same general method of reconstituting the Allivibrio fischeri reagent in the Reconstitution Solution. Corrections are made for salinity and particulate matter, then the bacteria are exposed to the sample solution depending on the methods of the particular test. The light output of the bacteria is measured using a photometer after five and 15 minutes from exposing the bacteria to the samples. The light measured directly correlates to the toxicity of the sample, producing data that allows for the calculation of EC50 or IC50s, or other ECxx and ICxx values.

Acute Toxicity Basic Test is a procedure that measures the relative acute toxicity of a sample. This test is the best protocol for testing samples of unknown toxicity, a high level of toxicity, or when the test results are required to provide the highest confidence and precision. This test consists of two controls and eight sample dilutions in duplicate.

Acute Toxicity 100% Test is a procedure that tests the sample at 100% sample concentration and as a result includes adding reagent solution directly to the sample. This test is used for samples that are expected to have a low level of toxicity and is generally used as an environmental screening tool. Compared to the Basic Test it is more sensitive to operator technique, and as a result may be less precise.

Acute Toxicity Solid-Phase Test is a procedure that allows the test organism to come in direct contact with the solid sample as particulate in an aqueous suspension. Normally, this test provides results indicating equal or higher toxicity when compared to eluate or pore water tests of the same sample. This is due to either equal or increased bioavailability resulting from direct contact. This test is subject to several sources of interference of luminescence including loss of bacteria from effects other than toxicity such as filtration of the sample; absorption of light due to color; and scattering of light due to turbidity. Corrections can be made by testing a sample of similar particle composition that is known to not be toxic. This test consists of two controls and 13 sample dilutions in duplicate. The Solid-Phase Test exposes the bacteria in such a way that is not always possible with pore water and elutriate.

Acute Toxicity Comparison & Inhibition Tests are the best procedures for testing samples with a low level of toxicity when an ECxx can not be determined using the Basic Test. These protocols are recommended for testing waste water treatment plant effluent, stormwater runoff, drinking water, pore water, and eluate. These tests use multiple replicates of a sample at a single concentration. Similar to the Basic Test, the Comparison Test protocol uses zero time light readings used for correcting the timed light level readings. The Inhibition Test procedure does not use zero time light readings and therefore, can not use a correction factor for the timed light level readings. Both of these tests consists of five controls and five replicates of the sample at a single concentration.

=== Microtox Omni software ===
The Microtox Omni software was developed by Azur Environmental and allows users of the Microtox Model 500 analyser to run tests, visualize data, calculate statistics and generate reports. This program contains a set of templates for all of the commonly used toxicity tests and allows you to modify or add to the provided templates. The modification of these templates allows for the production of new test formats not originally included with the software. The test templates that are included in this software define all of the parameters for a particular test method. This program calculates the most efficient way of setting up the desired test on the Model 500 Analyser. A test tutor is also included with Microsoft Omni that gives listed instructions on how to set up and run the test of interest. This software allows users to load files from previous versions of the Microtox DOS Software and also gives users the ability to save new data in that original format. A database is included in this software that grants users to access data from a number of other users and test sites, allowing for a comparison of data and trend changes over time. Microtox Omni can be used with any number of databases.

== Application ==
Microtox has a variety of environmental and industrial applications. Common applications are for testing the toxicity of both marine and freshwater, as well as sediments for pesticides and other inorganic and organic chemicals.

Drinking water: Microtox is used to test drinking water sources in many areas where either accidental or deliberate contamination is possible. Toxic contaminants in drinking water are indicated by a change in the color or intensity of light, or by a change in the rate of oxygen use.

Lakes and rivers: Microtox is used to test the toxicity of lake and river sediments contaminated by metals or nonspecific contaminants. The Solid-Phase test is used for sediments, while either the Basic test or the 100% test is used for pore water.

Sediment testing: Microtox is used to test and evaluate the toxicity of various marine and freshwater sediments contaminated by metals and organics. Aqueous extracts of contaminated soils, drilling muds, and sludge. Microtox data may be used to establish apparent effects threshold (AET), sediment quality standards and used for NPDES permits, as well as Superfund cleanup levels.

Industrial: This bioassay is used in the assessment of the toxicity of complex industrial effluent sources. It is a cost-effective way for monitoring and testing large numbers of samples. Microtox can also be applied as an early warning system (EWS) and aid in detecting the presence of toxic materials, as well as predict the outcomes of other bioassays and tests.

Microtox has also been applied to animal testing as an in vitro alternative.

== Ecological relevance ==
Numerous studies and published data comparing Microtox results with toxicity values for fish, crustaceans and algae have found a positive correlation. However, others have pointed out that the effect of luminosity on the survival of organisms is unknown. Concerns have also been expressed regarding the use of sediment extracts and not the sediment itself. It is possible that only water-soluble contaminants will be tested for, and therefore may not be representative of the full range of contaminants present in the sediment. Extracts may also remove contaminants that are not bioavailable. This could lead to an over or under estimation of contaminants and their biological effects.
