= Margaret McFall-Ngai =

American animal physiologist and biochemist

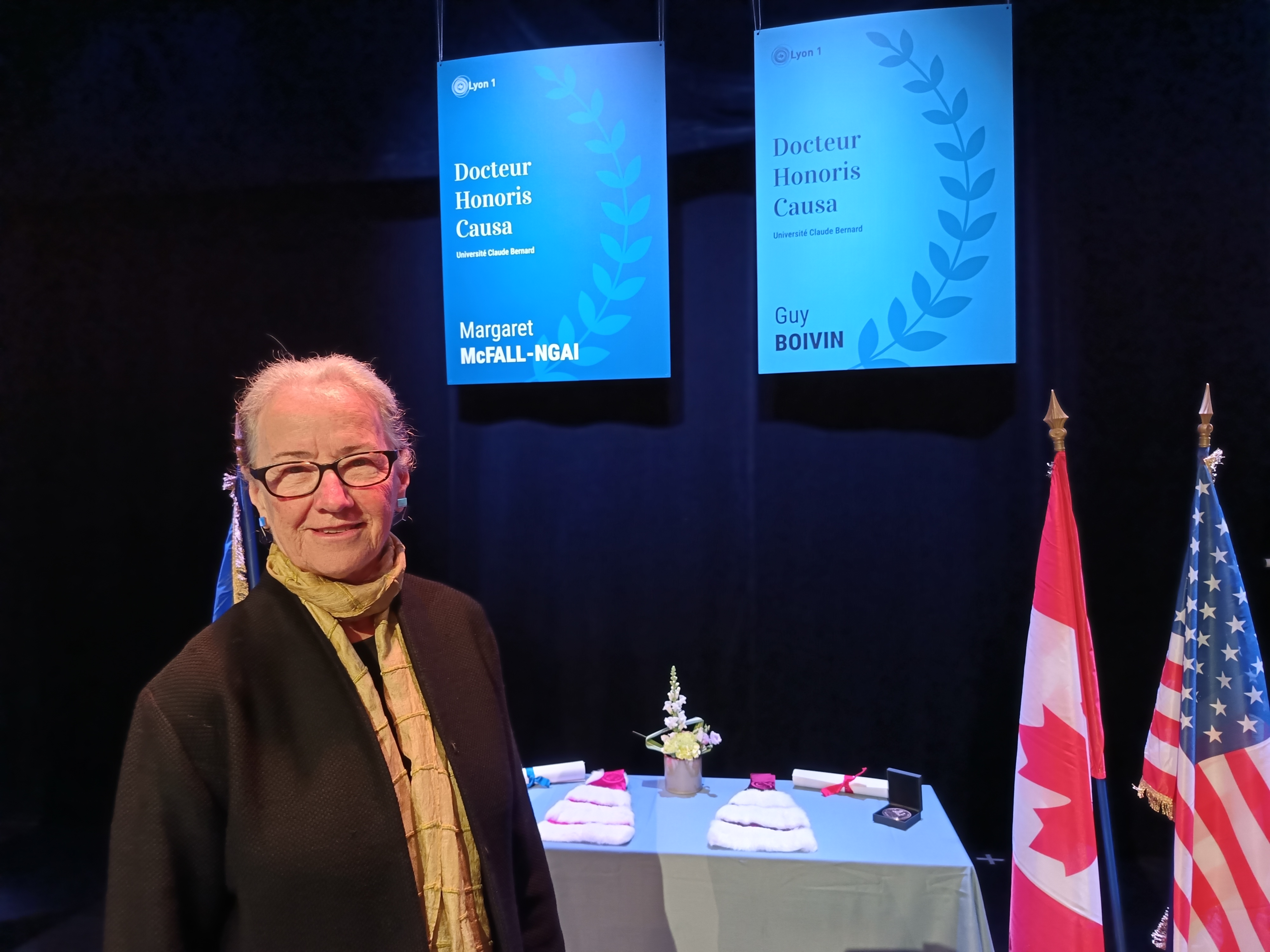
- Born: Margaret McFall-Ngai
- Education: University of San Francisco; University of California, Los Angeles
- Known for: Host-bacterial symbiosis 'Design' of tissues that interact with light
- Scientific career
- Fields: Biology
- Workplaces: Carnegie Science; Caltech; University of Hawaiʻi at Mānoa; University of Wisconsin-Madison; University of Southern California
- Thesis: (1983)
- Doctoral advisor: James Morin
- Other academic advisors: Joseph Horwitz; George Somero
- Website: http://glowingsquid.org/

Margaret Jean McFall-Ngai (born 1951) is an American animal physiologist and biochemist best-known for her work related to the symbiotic relationship between Hawaiian bobtail squid, Euprymna scolopes and bioluminescent bacteria, Vibrio fischeri. Her research helped expand the microbiology field, primarily focused on pathogenicity and decomposition at the time, to include positive microbial associations. She has been a professor at PBRC's Kewalo Marine Laboratory and director of the Pacific Biosciences Research Program at the University of Hawaiʻi at Mānoa. In 2022, she joined Carnegie Institution for Science's newly created Biosphere Sciences & Engineering research division and moved her laboratory to Caltech, in Pasadena, California.

== Education and career ==
McFall-Ngai spent her childhood in Southern California and attended Immaculate Heart High School in Los Angeles. She attended college at the University of San Francisco, graduating in 1973 with a Bachelors of Science in biology. She chose to further her education at the University of California, Los Angeles (UCLA) with doctoral advisor, James Morin, studying functional morphology and comparative physiology while working as a teaching assistant/fellow. Her graduate research took her to the central Philippines to study the relationship between bioluminescent bacteria found in the leiognathid light organ in fish, igniting her "lifelong interest" in the blend of the two subjects. McFall-Ngai graduated with her Ph.D. in Biology in 1983 and went on to complete two postdoctoral fellowships. For her first postdoc, she remained at UCLA working on protein biochemistry-biophysics for the Jules Stein Eye Institute with advisor, Joseph Horwitz. She then moved to San Diego to work with advisor George Somero on protein chemistry enzymology at the Scripps Institute of Oceanography at the University of California, San Diego. On the side McFall-Ngai had been exploring the Hawaiian bobtail squid as an alternative to the fish she had studied in graduate school and initiated what would become a career-long collaboration with microbiologist, Edward (Ned) Ruby, who had written his dissertation on the squids' symbionts, Vibrio fischeri.

In 1989, McFall-Ngai accepted a position and later received tenure at the University of Southern California in the Department of Biology and began breeding and studying the Hawaiian bobtail squid. She and Ruby moved to Hawaii in 1996 to better study the squid-bacteria relationship, both accepting positions at Pacific Biomedical Research Center at the University of Hawaii. In 2004, McFall-Ngai accepted a position as professor in the Department of Medical Microbiology and Immunology at the University of Wisconsin–Madison and the Eye Research institute. She returned to Hawaii in 2015 when she accepted the position as director of the Pacific Biosciences Research Program and professor at PBRC's Kewalo Marine Laboratory at the University of Hawaiʻi at Mānoa.

== Research ==
McFall-Ngai is a pioneer in the study of animal-bacterial symbiosis and known for her research of the Hawaiian bobtail squid, Euprymna scolopes, and its relationship with bacteria, Vibrio fischeri. She initially began her research in graduate school studying fish with a similar bioluminescent bacterial relationship, however, these fish proved difficult to grow in the lab. At a meeting, a visiting researcher from the University of Hawaii suggested she investigate the Hawaiian bobtail squid and its bioluminescent symbionts V. fischeri as an alternative. McFall-Ngai found that the squid worked great in the lab with 8-10 pairs of squid generating roughly 60,000 juveniles a year. To fully study this relationship, McFall-Ngai began collaborating with Edward (Ned) Ruby, a microbiologist who had written his dissertation on V. fischeri.

Over the next three decades, McFall-Ngai, Ruby, and dozens of postdocs and students would investigate all aspects of the symbiotic relationship. They worked to understand the development of the relationship at different stages of the squid life cycle, analyze the initiation of symbiosis in real time, and identify how the host selects its symbionts. They learned that the squid follows a rhythmic pattern in which the bacteria are brightest when the squid hunt at night and are then expelled at dawn. As analysis tools advanced, Ruby and McFall-Ngai were able to map transcriptional patterns and identify related genes that control the squid's rhythmic behaviors and symbiotic relationship. The sum of their Hawaiian bobtail squid research is an extremely well defined model organism fit for studying bacterial symbioses, light interacting tissues, and cephalopod development.

== Awards and honors ==
- 1983: UCLA Graduate Woman of the Year
- 1985 – 1986: NIH National Research Service Award
- 1986 – 1988: University of California President's Fellow
- 1994: Albert S. Raubenheimer Award for Outstanding Junior Faculty, University of Southern California
- 1999 – 2000: Miescher-Ishida Prize from the International Society Endocytobiology
- 2002: Regents' Medal for Excellence in Research, University of Hawaii
- 2008: Arthur Furst Distinguished Research Award, University of San Francisco
- 2009 – 2010: John Simon Guggenheim Fellowship
- 2011 – 2013: Moore Scholar at California Institute of Technology
- 2011 – 2016: EU Marie Curie Fellowship
- 2015: Doctor Honoris Causa, Ecole Polytechnique Federale de Lausanne, Switzerland
- 2019: ARCS Foundation Scientist of the Year

== Society fellowships (elected) ==
- 2002: American Academy of Microbiology fellow
- 2011: American Academy of Arts and Sciences
- 2014: National Academy of Science

== Notable publications ==
- Care for the community.
- Animals in a bacterial world, a new imperative for the life sciences.
- The winnowing: establishing the squid–vibrio symbiosis.
- Unseen Forces: The Influence of Bacteria on Animal Development.
- Bacterial symbionts induce host organ morphogenesis during early postembryonic development of the squid Euprymna scolopes.
- Reflectins: The Unusual Proteins of Squid Reflective Tissues.
- Vibrio fischeri lux Genes Play an Important Role in Colonization and Development of the Host Light Organ

== Biographic profiles ==
- Microbiology: Here's looking at you, squid. By Ed Yong.
- PNAS: Profile of Margaret McFall-Ngai. By Jennifer Viegas.
- I contain multitudes: the microbes within us and a grander view of life (Chapter 3: "Body Builders"). By Ed Yong.

=== Interviews ===
- Futuretech podcast: Hawaiian Bobtail Squid: Using Light to Hide in the Dark—Dr. Margaret Mc-Fall Ngai—The Squid Vibrio Labs.
- CIFAR Q&A with Margaret McFall-Ngai.
- The Extra Pounds You Can't Afford to Lose: An Interview With Microbiologist Margaret McFall-Ngai.
