= Robert Diez =

German sculptor (1844–1922)

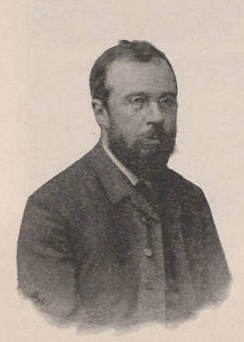
Robert Diez (before 1909)

Robert Diez (20 April 1844 – 7 October 1922) was a German sculptor.

== Life ==
He was born in Pößneck as the son of that town's mayor. His artistic inclinations began to emerge at his grandparents home in Sonneberg, the center of the German toy-making industry. During his years at the Gymnasium in Meiningen, he lived with his uncle Samuel Friedrich Diez, the Court Painter, who strongly encouraged Robert to pursue a career in art. He began his artistic training in 1863 at the Dresden Academy of Fine Arts. From 1867 to 1870, he was a pupil of Johannes Schilling. After his father died and he lost his means of support, he went to work in Schilling's studio. By 1872, he was able to open a studio of his own and take the traditional study trip to Rome.

Diez was made an honorary member of the Academy in 1881. He succeeded Ernst Julius Hähnel at the Master Studio for Plastic Arts and became a member of the Academic Council in 1891. He was named a full Professor shortly thereafter. Ernst Barlach and Selmar Werner were among his best-known students. He became a member of the Royal Academy of Arts in 1895. In 1912, he received an appointment as a Geheimrat. Diez died in 1922 in Loschwitz.

== Major works ==
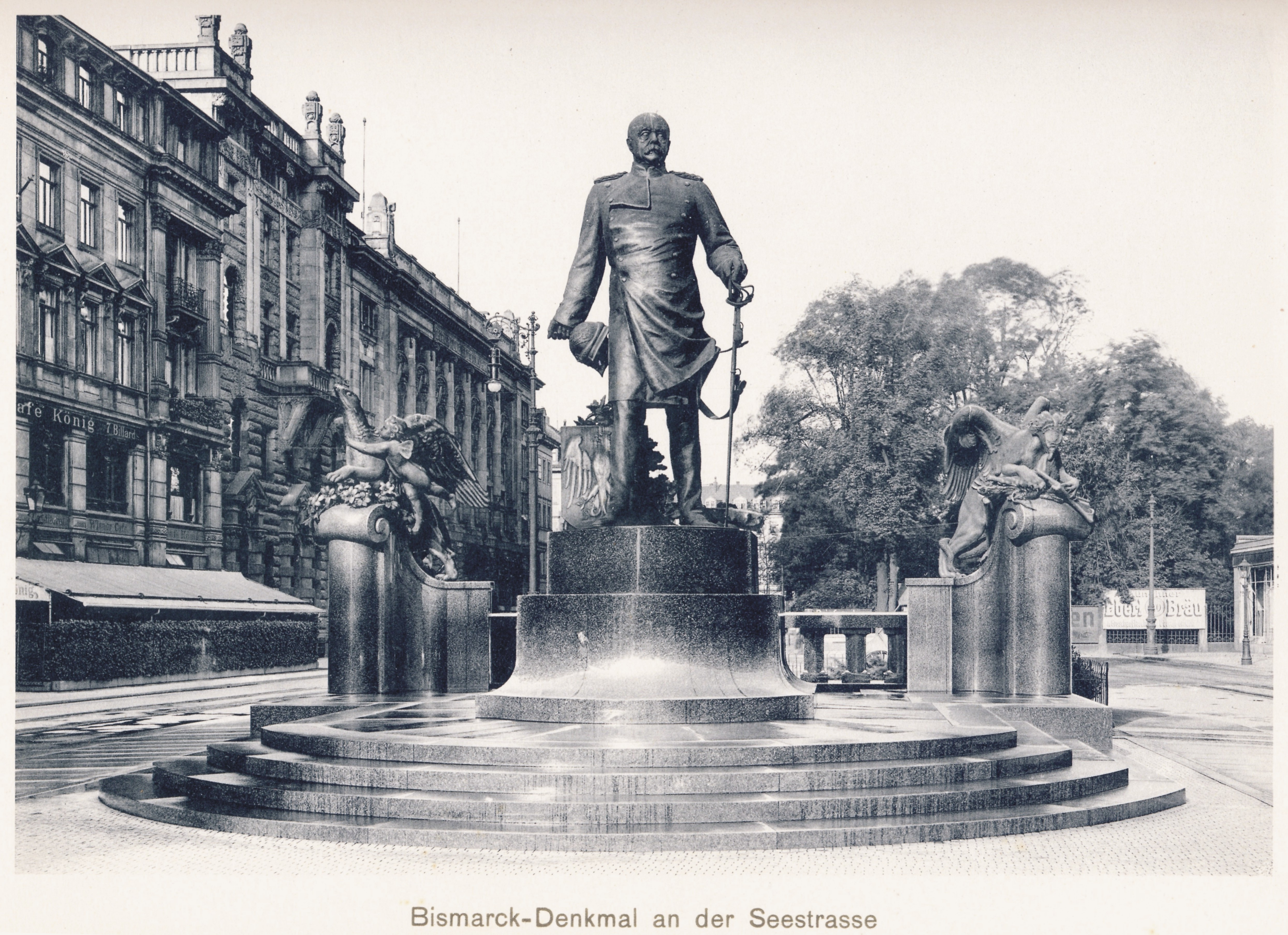
Bismarck Memorial, Dresden (c.1910)

- Dresden
  - Gänsediebbrunnen (Goose-thief Fountain). It received a gold medal at the Internationalen Kunstausstellung in München (1878). The fountain is now in the "Weiße Gasse", a pedestrian mall.
  - Twin fountains Stille Wasser und Stürmische Wogen (Still Water and Stormy Waves, 1883–1894) on the Albertplatz.
  - Bismarck Monument, Seestraße (1903). Parts of the monument were melted down for military use in 1944 and the remainder was removed by the Soviet administration in 1946. The granite pedestal and stairs were recycled in 1949.
- Braunschweig
  - Heimkehr des Kriegers (Return of the Warrior), figure group that makes up part of the Siegesdenkmal (Victory Monument), begun by Adolf Breymann. The design was by Diez and the figures were executed by Hermann Heinrich Howaldt.
- Meiningen
  - Bechsteinbrunnen (Bechstein Fountain), in the "English Garden" (1909), dedicated to the poet Ludwig Bechstein.

Many of his original casts and designs were in the Pößneck Heritage Museum, which was destroyed in 1945.
