= Luminescent bacteria =

Luminescent bacteria emit light as the result of a chemical reaction during which chemical energy is converted to light energy. Luminescent bacteria exist as symbiotic organisms carried within a larger organism, such as many deep sea organisms, including the Lantern Fish, the Angler fish, certain jellyfish, certain clams and the Gulper eel. The light is generated by an enzyme-catalyzed chemoluminescence reaction, wherein the pigment luciferin is oxidised by the enzyme luciferase. The expression of genes related to bioluminescence is controlled by an operon called the lux operon.

Some species of luminescent bacteria possess quorum sensing, the ability to determine local population by the concentration of chemical messengers. Species which have quorum sensing can turn on and off certain chemical pathways, commonly luminescence; in this way, once population levels reach a certain point the bacteria switch on light-production

== Characteristics of the phenomenon ==
Bioluminescence is a form of luminescence, or "cold light" emission; less than 20% of the light generates thermal radiation. It should not be confused with fluorescence, phosphorescence or refraction of light. Most forms of bioluminescence are brighter (or only exist) at night, following a circadian rhythm.

=== See also ===
- Dinoflagellates
- Vibrionaceae (e.g. Vibrio fischeri, Vibrio harveyi, Vibrio phosphoreum)
