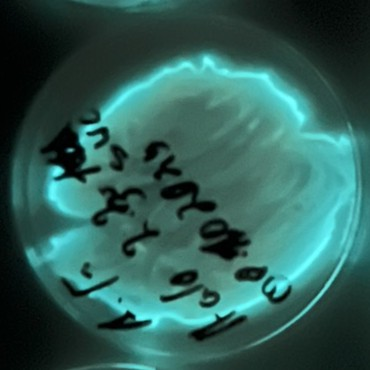
- Aliivibrio fischeri glowing on a petri dish

Scientific classification
- Domain: Bacteria
- Kingdom: Pseudomonadati
- Phylum: Pseudomonadota
- Class: Gammaproteobacteria
- Order: Vibrionales
- Family: Vibrionaceae
- Genus: Aliivibrio
- Species: A. fischeri

Binomial name
- Aliivibrio fischeri (Beijerinck 1889) Urbanczyk et al. 2007

Synonyms
- Achromobacter fischeri (Beijerinck 1889) Bergey et al. 1930; Bacillus fischeri (Beijerinck 1889) Trevisan 1889; Bacterium phosphorescens indigenus (Eisenberg 1891) Chester 1897; Einheimischer leuchtbacillus Fischer 1888; Microspira fischeri (Beijerinck 1889) Chester 1901; Microspira marina (Russell 1892) Migula 1900; Photobacterium fischeri Beijerinck 1889; Vibrio fischeri (Beijerinck 1889) Lehmann & Neumann 1896; Vibrio noctiluca Weisglass and Skreb 1963

= Aliivibrio fischeri =

Species of bacterium

Aliivibrio fischeri (formerly Vibrio fischeri) is a non-pathogenic, Gram-negative, rod-shaped bacterium found globally in marine environments. This bacterium grows most effectively in water with a salt concentration at around 20g/L, and at temperatures between 24 and 28 °C. Free-living A. fischeri cells survive on decaying organic matter. It is heterotrophic, oxidase-positive, and motile by means of a tuft of polar flagella. A. fischeri is found predominantly in symbiosis with various marine animals, such as the Hawaiian bobtail squid. A. fischeri also has bioluminescent properties controlled by the lux operon. The bacterium is a key research organism for examination of bacterial-animal symbiosis, microbial bioluminescence, and quorum sensing. It is named after Bernhard Fischer, a German microbiologist.

Aliivibrio fischeri is in the family Vibrionaceae. This family of bacteria tend to have adaptable metabolisms that can adjust to diverse circumstances. This flexibility may contribute to A. fischeri's ability to survive both alone and in symbiotic relationships.

Ribosomal RNA comparison led to the reclassification of this species from the genus Vibrio to the newly created Aliivibrio in 2007. The change is recognized as a valid publication, and according to the List of Prokaryotic names with Standing in Nomenclature (LPSN), the correct name. However, the name change has not been universally adopted by most researchers, who still publish using the name Vibrio fischeri.

== Ecology ==
A. fischeri are globally distributed in temperate and subtropical marine environments. They can be found free-floating in oceans, as well as associated with marine animals, sediment, and decaying matter. A. fischeri have been most studied as symbionts of marine animals, including squids in the genus Euprymna and Sepiola, where A. fischeri can be found in the squids' light organs. This relationship has been best characterized in the Hawaiian bobtail squid (Euprymna scolopes). A. fischeri is the only species of bacteria inhabiting the squid's light organ, despite an environment full of other bacteria.

=== Symbiosis with the Hawaiian bobtail squid ===
A. fischeri colonization of the light organ of the Hawaiian bobtail squid (Euprymna scolopes) is currently studied as a simple model for mutualistic symbiosis, as it contains only two species and A. fischeri can be cultured in a lab and genetically modified. Aliivibrio fischeri utilizes chitin as a primary carbon and nitrogen source in its symbiosis with the Hawaiian bobtail squid. In the squid's light organ, A. fischeri breaks down chitin into N-acetylglucosamine (GlcNAc), which acts as both a nutrient and a chemoattractant, guiding colonization. Chitinases facilitate this breakdown, while the regulatory protein NagC controls gene expression for chitin and GlcNAc use. The bacteria metabolize GlcNAc through fermentation or respiration, supporting energy needs and bioluminescence, which are crucial for the mutualistic relationship with the squid. This mutualistic symbiosis provides A. fischeri with nutrients and a protected environment and helps the squid avoid predation using bioluminescence.

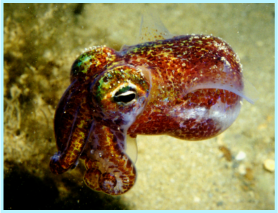
The Hawaiian bobtail squid, its photophores populated with Aliivibrio fischeri

A. fischeri provides luminescence by colonizing the light organ of the Hawaiian bobtail squid, which is on its ventral side. The organ luminesces at night, providing the squid with counter-illumination camouflage. The light organs of some squid contain reflective plates that intensify and direct the light produced, due to proteins known as reflectins. They regulate the light intensity to match that of the sea surface below. This strategy prevents the squid from casting a shadow on the ocean floor, helping it avoid predation during feeding. The A. fischeri population is maintained by daily cycles. About 90% of A. fischeri are ejected by the squid every morning in a process known as "venting". The 10% of bacteria remaining in the squid replenish the bacterial population before the following night. The purpose of this is to refresh cultures and regulate the population.

A. fischeri are horizontally acquired by young squids from their environment. Venting is thought to provide the source from which newly hatched squid are colonized. This colonization induces developmental and morphological changes in the squid's light organ, which is translucent. Morphological changes made by A. fischeri do not occur when the microbe cannot luminesce, such as a decrease in the number of pores in the light organ. Additionally, if colonization by A. fischeri is abruptly removed by antibiotics, the ciliated epithelium of the light organ will regress. These changes show that bioluminescence is truly essential for symbiosis.

Evidence has shown that the viscosity of the surrounding seawater can affect colonization of the Hawaiian bobtail squid. In low viscosity water, A. fischeri exhibits run-tumble swimming in which forward motion alternates with random reorientation. In high-viscosity water, A. fischeri switches to run-reverse-flick swimming, where forward and backward movements are finished with a sharp change in direction. This change in swimming allows A. fischeri to increase its chances of remaining in the mucus layer and successfully colonizing the light organ.

In the process of colonization, ciliated cells within the animals' photophores (light-producing organs) selectively draw in the symbiotic bacteria. These cells create microcurrents that, when combined with mucus, promote the growth of the symbionts and actively reject any competitors. The bacteria cause the ciliated cells to die once the light organ is sufficiently colonized.

The symbiosis between these two organisms illustrates a One Health principle that the health and well-being of marine animals can depend on the stability and microbial diversity of their ecosystems. Disruptions to the marine ecosystem such as pollution can harm the microbial presence thus affecting the Hawaiian bobtail squid in a negative manner.

== Genome ==
The genome of A. fischeri was completely sequenced in 2004 and consists of two chromosomes, one smaller and one larger. Chromosome 1 has 2.9 million base pairs (Mbp) and chromosome 2 has 1.5 Mbp, bringing the total genome to 4.4 Mbp.

A. fischeri has the lowest G+C content of 27 Vibrio species but is still related to higher-pathogenicity species such as V. cholerae. The genome for A. fischeri also carries mobile genetic elements. The precise functions of these elements in A. fischeri are not fully understood. However, they are known to acquire new genes that are associated with virulence and resistance to environmental stresses in other bacterial genomes.

Some strains of A. fischeri, such as strain ES114, contain a plasmid. The plasmid in strain ES114 is called pES100 and is most likely used for conjugation purposes. This purpose was determined based on the 45.8 kbp gene sequence, most of which codes for a type IV section system. The ability to perform conjugation can be helpful for both beneficial and pathogenic strains, as it allows for DNA exchange.

There is evidence that the genome of A. fischeri includes pilus gene clusters. These clusters encode for many different kinds of pili, which serve a variety of functions. In this species, there are pili used for pathogenesis, twitching motility, tight adhesion, and toxin-coregulation, and more.

== Metabolism ==
A. fischeri is a heterotroph. A. fischeri can be cultured using cAMP as a sole carbon and nitrogen source. It is also able to be cultured using glucose as the sole carbon source. When supplied with glucose pyruvate is created as a waste product, this pyruvate is then reabsorbed and used when glucose is unavailable. The reuptake and metabolism of pyruvate stops the accumulation of acidity in the light organ of the bobtail squid. Early scientist hypothesized the bobtail squid supplied their A. fisheri colonies with either cAMP or glucose in exchange for its luminescence. Chitin acts as the main amino acid and carbon source during symbiosis with bobtail squid. during the metabolism of the chitin, oligosaccharides are formed that chemoattract more A. fischeri. The light organ of the bobtail squid is iron limiting. A. fischeri makes proteins to makes use of ferric iron, ferrous iron, and heme iron at different levels during the symbiosis to obtain iron.

A. fischeri is capable of aerobic respiration using oxidants found in its genome, using these slows the oxygen dependent luciferase pathway that results in bio illumination. The light organ only remains oxygenated for a limited period of time after venting and the use of aerobic respiration during this period Is not fully understood.

In both the aquatic and symbiotic environment A. fischeri is capable of Anaerobic respiration. trimethylamine N-oxide (TMAO), nitrate, nitrite, and fumarate compounds are the usable terminal acceptors. TMAO reductase is found in mature symbiotic A. fischeri and may point to its use in anaerobic respiration during bobtail symbiosis.

Fermentation is a characteristic of the Vibrionaceae family including A. fischeri. fermentation is the most efficient use of the symbiotic chitin and is performed at night when a high luminescence is required. Chitin and GlcNAc fermentation provides fast ATP and does not require the oxygen luciferase uses in bio illumination.

== Bioluminescence ==
Certain strains of V. fischeri have the ability to produce visible light, one of these strains is A. fischeri. The bioluminescence of A. fischeri is caused by transcription of the lux operon, and the following translation of the lux proteins, which produce the light. This process is induced through population-dependent quorum sensing. The population of A. fischeri needs to reach an optimal level to activate the lux operon and stimulate light production. The circadian rhythm controls light expression, where luminescence is much brighter during the day and dimmer at night, as required for camouflage.

The bacterial luciferin-luciferase system is encoded by a set of genes labelled the lux operon. In A. fischeri, five such genes (luxCDABEG) have been identified as active in the emission of visible light, and two genes (luxR and luxI) are involved in regulating the operon. The luxI gene produces the autoinducer (N-acyl homoserine lactone, AHL). The autoinducer binds to the LuxR protein, and this complex activates the lux operon promoter. This creates a positive feedback loop. Several external and intrinsic factors appear to either induce or inhibit the transcription of this gene set and produce or suppress light emission. The threshold concentration that is required for activation of the Lux operon by AHL is not a fixed range and can vary depending on the bacterial species. This system is the model system for Quorum Sensing as a general concept.

A. fischeri is one of many species of bacteria that commonly form symbiotic relationships with marine organisms. Marine organisms contain bacteria that use bioluminescence so they can find mates, ward off predators, attract prey, or communicate with other organisms. In return, the organism the bacteria are living within provides the bacteria with a nutrient-rich environment. Light production by these bacteria is also a density dependent trait, meaning light production depends on the interactions between species.

On the lux operon, luxA and luxB code for the protein subunits of the luciferase enzyme, and the luxCDE codes for a fatty acid reductase complex that makes the fatty acids necessary for the luciferase mechanism. luxC codes for the enzyme acyl-reductase, luxD codes for acyl-transferase, and luxE makes the proteins needed for the enzyme acyl-protein synthetase. Luciferase produces blue/green light through the oxidation of reduced flavin mononucleotide and a long-chain aldehyde by diatomic oxygen. The reaction is summarized as:

FMNH_{2} + O_{2} + R-CHO → FMN + R-COOH + H_{2}O + light.

The reduced flavin mononucleotide (FMNH) is provided by the fre gene, also referred to as luxG. In A. fischeri, it is directly next to luxE (giving luxCDABE-fre).

To generate the aldehyde needed in the reaction above, three additional enzymes are needed. The fatty acids needed for the reaction are pulled from the fatty acid biosynthesis pathway by acyl-transferase. Acyl-transferase reacts with acyl-ACP to release R-COOH, a free fatty acid. R-COOH is reduced by a two-enzyme system to an aldehyde. The reaction is:

R-COOH + ATP + NADPH → R-CHO + AMP + PP + NADP^{+}.

== Quorum sensing ==
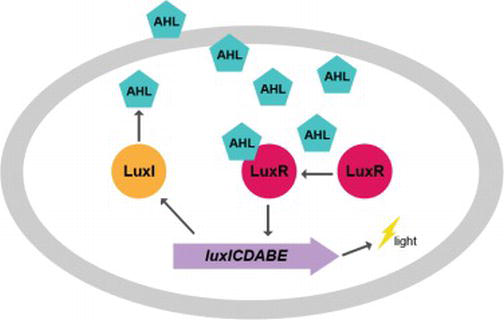
Quorum sensing in Aliivibrio fischeri Green pentagons denote AHL autoinducer that LuxI produces (3OC6-homoserine lactone). Transcriptional regulator, LuxR, modulates expression of AHL synthase, LuxI, and the lux operon, leading to luciferase-mediated light emission

One primary system that controls bioluminescence through regulation of the lux operon is quorum sensing, a conserved mechanism across many microbial species that regulates gene expression in response to bacterial concentration. Quorum sensing functions through the production of an autoinducer, usually a small organic molecule, by individual cells. As cell populations increase, levels of autoinducers increase, and specific proteins that regulate transcription of genes bind to these autoinducers, altering gene expression. This system allows microbial cells to "communicate" amongst each other and coordinate behaviors, such as luminescence, which require large amounts of cells to produce a noticeable effect.

In A. fischeri, there are two primary quorum sensing systems, each of which responds to slightly different environments. The first system is commonly referred to as the lux system, as it is encoded within the lux operon, and uses the autoinducer 3OC6-HSL. The protein LuxI synthesizes this signal, which is subsequently released from the cell. This signal, 3OC6-HSL, then binds to the protein LuxR, which regulates the expression of many different genes, but most notably upregulation of genes involved in luminescence. The second system, commonly referred to as the ain system, uses the autoinducer C8-HSL, which is produced by the protein AinS. Similar to the lux system, the autoinducer C8-HSL increases activation of LuxR. In addition, C8-HSL binds to another transcriptional regulator, LitR, giving the ain and lux systems of quorum sensing slightly different genetic targets within the cell.

The different genetic targets of the ain and lux systems are essential, because these two systems respond to different cellular environments. The ain system regulates transcription in response to intermediate cell density cell environments, producing lower levels of luminescence and even regulating metabolic processes such as the acetate switch. In contrast, the lux quorum sensing system occurs in response to high cell densities, producing high levels of luminescence and regulating the transcription of additional genes, including QsrP, RibB, and AcfA. Both of the ain and lux quorum sensing systems are essential for colonization of the squid and regulate multiple colonization factors in the bacteria.

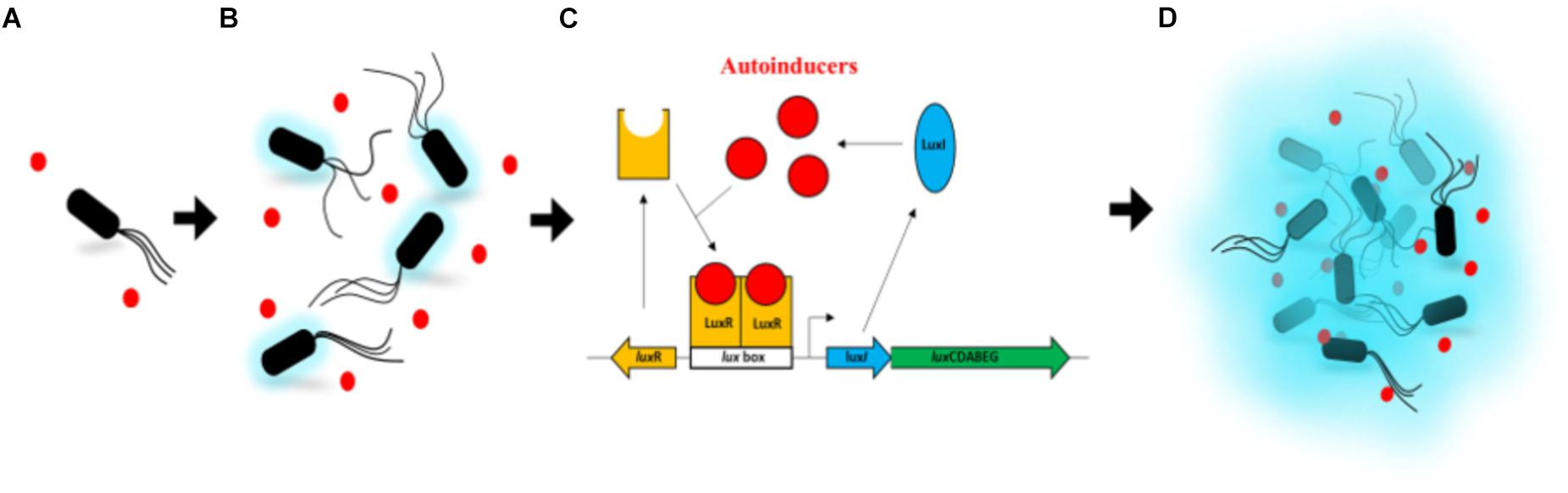
Activation of the lux operon by LuxR and LuxI in Aliivibrio fischeri (A) At low cell density, the autoinducers (3OC6-HSL – red dots), produced by LuxI, diffuse through the cell membrane into the growth medium (B) As the cell growth continues, the autoinducers in the medium start to accumulate in a confined environment. A very low intensity of light can be detected. (C) When enough autoinducers have accumulated in the medium, they can re-enter the cell where they directly bind the LuxR protein to activate luxICDABEG expression. (D) High levels of autoinducers activate the luminescent system of A. fischeri. A high intensity of light can be detected.

== Research applications ==
A. fischeri has broad applications in ecotoxicology and environmental research. Its bioluminescence is observed in oxygen-rich environments and thus is sensitive to toxicants. The International Organization for Standardization (ISO) published ISO 11348, which established the regulatory standard for determining the inhibitory effects of water toxicants on the reduction of bioluminescence in A. fischeri. Reductions in light emissions are used in bioassays such as the Microtox test to assess water quality. It plays a key role in studying the effects of chemical mixtures, helping identify synergistic or antagonistic toxic interactions. In biotechnology, its light-producing mechanism is harnessed for developing biosensors that detect environmental pollutants in real time, making it a valuable tool in pollution monitoring and water treatment studies. Bioluminescence inhibition assays of A. fischeri can be used to measure for organic solvents, heavy metals, polycyclic aromatic hydrocarbons (PAH's), pesticides, and total petroleum hydrocarbons (TPH's). The bacteria's adaptation to competitive marine environments, where they may produce unique bioactive compounds, may also position them as useful organisms for discovering novel antibiotics from marine sources.

Complex mixtures of toxicants give unique time-dependent inhibition of bioluminescence. Knowing how different toxicants interact and effect A. fischeri at specific times allow for more accurate bioassay measurements. Common A. fischeri bioassays use individual measurements from a photometer to calculate an end point of inhibition given several data points; using Area under the curve analysis of bioluminescent inhibition is more likely to signify toxicity level and provide a better marker for water quality.

== Natural transformation ==
Natural bacterial transformation is an adaptation for transferring DNA from one individual cell to another. The process of natural transformation allows the uptake and incorporation of exogenous DNA into the recipient genome in the form of plasmids or linear DNA pieces. Aliivibrio fischeri has demonstrated a condition known as competence where DNA is successfully integrated within the cell. Competence is demonstrated by a plasmid replicating on its own or through evidence of homologous recombination of the chromosome. Since A. fischeri can undergo natural transformation, it can be genetically manipulated using a pathway independent of typical plasmid conjugation. Studies have found that natural transformation in A. fischeri is induced by the presence of chitin oligosaccharides, specifically chitohexaose. When A. fischeri is grown in the presence of chitohexaose, the genes tfoX and tfoY are expressed and are likely regulating the process of natural transformation. This facilitates the rapid transfer of mutant genes across strains and provides a valuable tool for experimental genetic manipulation in A. fischeri.

== State microbe status ==
In 2014, Hawaiʻian State Senator Glenn Wakai submitted SB3124, proposing Aliivibrio fischeri as the state microbe of Hawaiʻi. The bill competed with a bill advocating for Flavobacterium akiainvivens to receive the same designation; ultimately, neither bill passed. In 2017, similar legislation similar to the original 2013 F. akiainvivens bill was submitted in the Hawaiʻi House of Representatives by Isaac Choy and in the Hawaiʻi Senate by Brian Taniguchi, but A. fischeri did not appear in this or any later proposals.

List of synonyms

- Achromobacter fischeri (Beijerinck 1889) Bergey et al. 1930
- Bacillus fischeri (Beijerinck 1889) Trevisan 1889
- Bacterium phosphorescens indigenus (Eisenberg 1891) Chester 1897
- Einheimischer leuchtbacillus Fischer 1888
- Microspira fischeri (Beijerinck 1889) Chester 1901
- Microspira marina (Russell 1892) Migula 1900
- Photobacterium fischeri Beijerinck 1889
- Vibrio noctiluca Weisglass and Skreb 1963

== See also ==
- Deep sea fish
- Marine biology
- Model organism
- Vibrio harveyi
- Vibrionaceae
- Biosensors
