= Hermann Heinrich Howaldt =

German sculptor

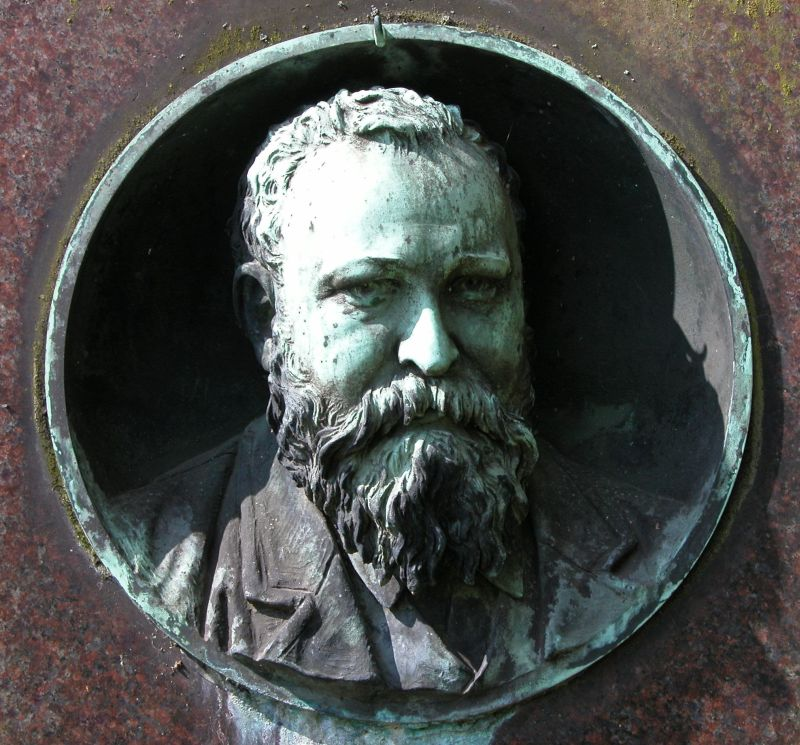
Relief of Hermann Howaldt on his gravestone in the Magnifriedhof, Braunschweig

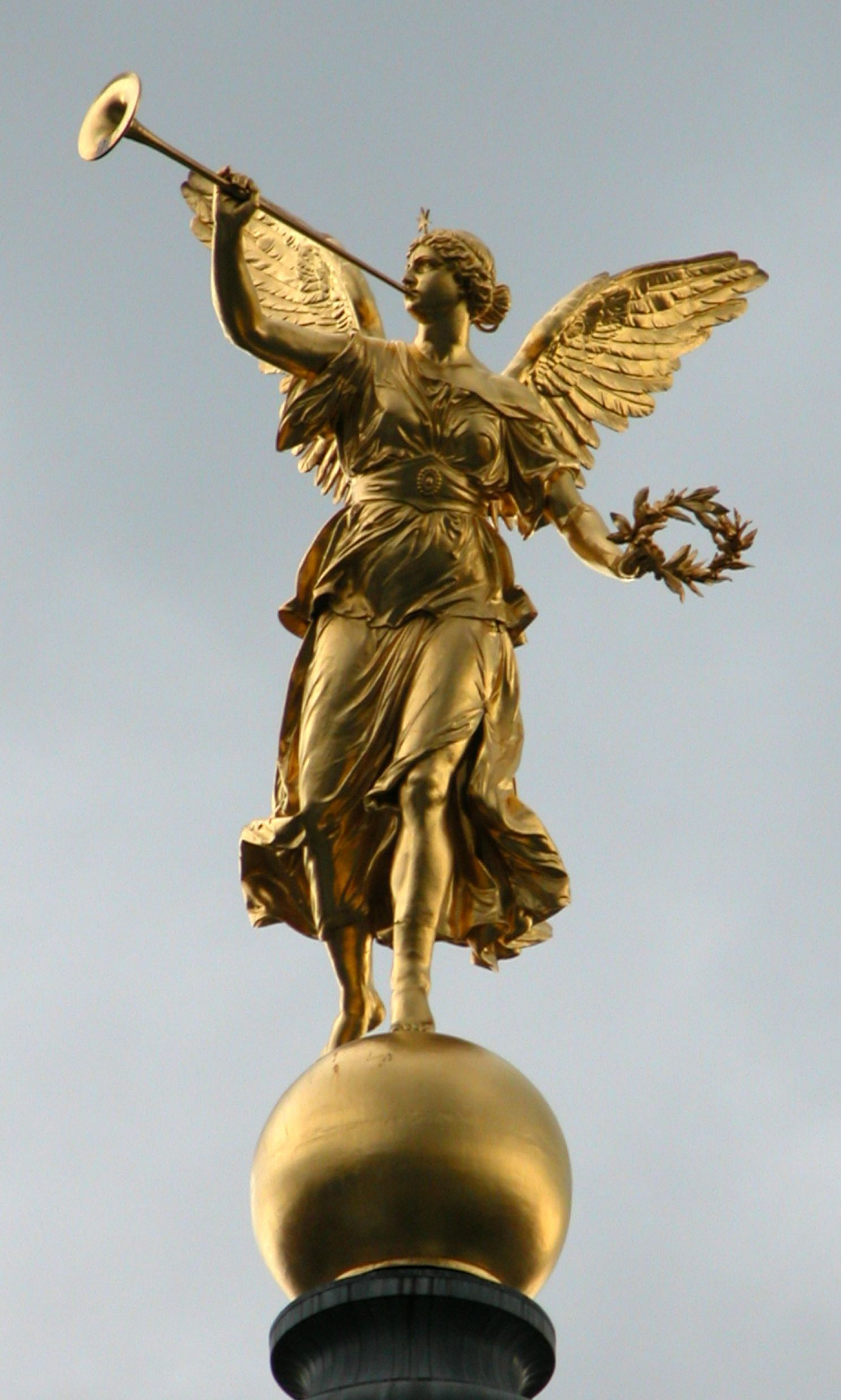
Fame on the dome of the exhibition hall, Dresden Academy of Fine Arts

Hermann Heinrich Howaldt (5 January 1841, Braunschweig - 2 December 1891, Braunschweig) was a German sculptor, metal caster and repoussé artist.

== Life ==
He was the fifth child of sculptor, metal caster and Professor Georg Ferdinand Howaldt and began his artistic studies in his father's workshop. When they were completed, the shop became "Georg Howaldt and Son". He married Helene Brust in 1872 and they had six children.

After 1880, he managed all of the company's commissions and, following his father's death, operated the foundry as well. His own death came eight years later in a tragic manner. While installing his statue Fame on the glass dome of the Dresden Academy, he fell from the scaffolding. His long-term employees joined with sculptor Paul Rinckleben, took a lease on the shop, and completed all the works in progress.

By 1903, the shop was having economic difficulties. Hermann's son Ferdinand (who had learned metal casting at the Braunschweig University of Technology) became the manager in an effort to save it but, three years later, had to declare bankruptcy.

== Selected projects ==
- Gauß-Statue, (1880), after a design by Fritz Schaper, Braunschweig
- Johann Sebastian Bach Memorial, (1883), after a design by Adolf von Donndorf, Eisenach
- Atlas Group, on the roof of the Frankfurt Hauptbahnhof, (1888)
- Statue of Germania, on the Siegesdenkmal (Victory Monument) in Leipzig, after a design by Rudolf Siemering (1888). It was removed in 1946. Apparently, a faction of the Social Democratic Party felt that it had Nazi overtones.
- Statue of Felix Mendelssohn Bartholdy, in front of Leipzig's Gewandhaus in the Musikviertel neighbourhood, after a design by Werner Stein, unveiled in 1892, removed during a trip abroad of Leipzig's mayor Carl Friedrich Goerdeler in November 1936 by order of his Nazi deputy. On 18 October 2008 a copy of the monument was solemnly inaugurated in the Promenadenring green spaces at St. Thomas Church.

== Sources ==
- Hermann Kindt: "Georg Howaldt und seine Werkstatt", in: Braunschweiger Kalender 1957, pps.36-40
- Gerd Spies: Braunschweiger Goldschmide, Klinkhardt & Biermann (1996) ISBN 3-7814-0393-9
