= Bernhard Fischer =

German bacteriologist (1852–1915)

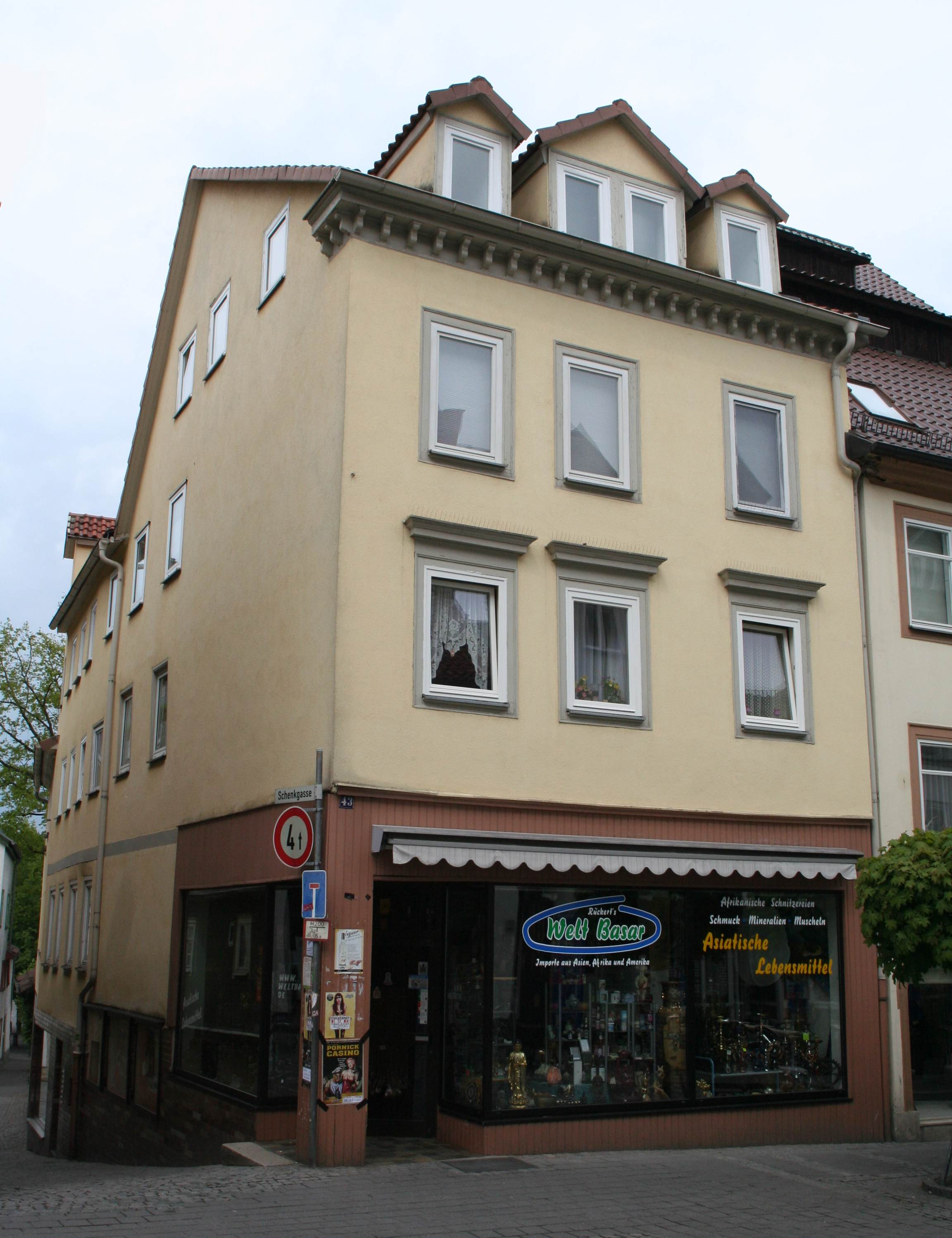
- Dwelling of Fischer's parents at Steinweg 43 in Coburg

Johann Friedrich Bernhard Fischer (19 February 1852 Coburg - 2 August 1915 Dadizele) was a German bacteriologist noted for his classification system for bacteria.

== Biography ==
After attending Casimirianum from 1862 to 1871, he was educated at the University of Berlin, received the degree of M.D. in 1875, and went to Egypt and India as member of the German Cholera Commission. In 1889, he was a member of the Plankton Expedition and 10 years later became professor at the University of Kiel. There he also became head of the Institute of Hygiene. He became generally known for his classification of bacteria. His Structure and Functions of Bacteria (2d ed., 1900), was the standard in its field.

== Works ==
- Die neueren Arzneimittel : für Apotheker, Aerzte und Drogisten . Springer, Berlin 5. Aufl. 1893 Digital edition by the University and State Library Düsseldorf
- Lehrbuch der Chemie für Pharmaceuten : mit besonderer Berücksichtigung der Vorbereitung zum Gehilfen-Examen; mit 103 Holzschnitten . Enke, Stuttgart 3rd ed. 1895 Digital edition / 5th ed. 1904 Digital edition by the University and State Library Düsseldorf
