= Trimethylamine-N-oxide reductase (cytochrome c) =

trimethylamine-N-oxide reductase (cytochrome c)

Identifiers
- EC no.: 1.7.2.3
- CAS no.: 37256-34-1

Databases
- IntEnz: IntEnz view
- BRENDA: BRENDA entry
- ExPASy: NiceZyme view
- KEGG: KEGG entry
- MetaCyc: metabolic pathway
- PRIAM: profile
- PDB structures: RCSB PDB PDBe PDBsum
- Gene Ontology: AmiGO / QuickGO
Search
- PMC: articles
- PubMed: articles
- NCBI: proteins

In enzymology, a trimethylamine-N-oxide reductase (cytochrome c) (EC 1.7.2.3) is an enzyme that catalyzes the chemical reaction

trimethylamine + 2 (ferricytochrome c)-subunit + H_{2}O $\rightleftharpoons$ trimethylamine N-oxide + 2 (ferrocytochrome c)-subunit + 2 H^{+}

The 3 substrates of this enzyme are trimethylamine, (ferricytochrome c)-subunit, and H_{2}O, whereas its 3 products are trimethylamine N-oxide, (ferrocytochrome c)-subunit, and H^{+}.

This enzyme belongs to the family of oxidoreductases, specifically those acting on other nitrogenous compounds as donors with a cytochrome as acceptor. The systematic name of this enzyme class is trimethylamine:cytochrome c oxidoreductase. Other names in common use include TMAO reductase, and TOR. This enzyme participates in two-component system - general.
