= 2010 Hawaii Senate election =

- November 2, 2010

15 of 25 seats in the Hawaii Senate 13 seats needed for a majority
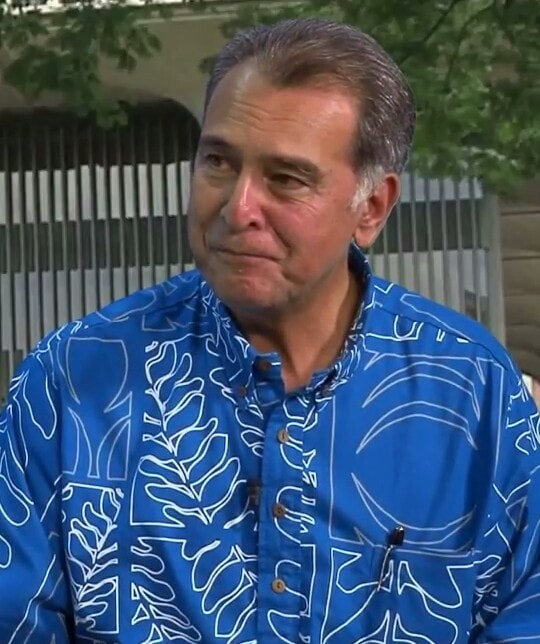

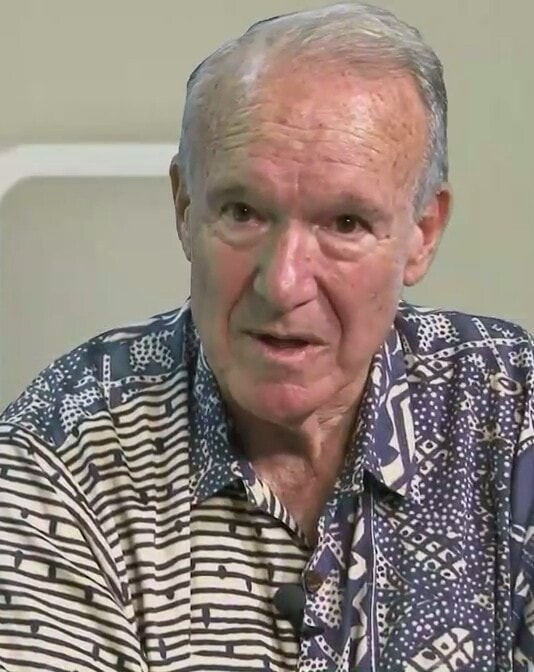
	Majority party	Minority party
Leader	Brickwood Galuteria	Fred Hemmings (retired)
Party	Democratic	Republican
Leader's seat	District 12	25th district
Last election	23	2
Seats after	24	1
Seat change	▲1	▼1
Popular vote	140,550	69,190
Percentage	67.01%	32.99%
President of the Senate before election
Colleen Hanabusa
Democratic
Elected President of the Senate
Shan Tsutsui
Democratic

The 2010 Hawaii Senate election was held on November 2, 2010, to determine which party would control the Hawaii Senate for the following two years in the 26th Hawaii State Legislature. Fifteen seats were up for election and the primary was held on September 18, 2010. Prior to the election, 23 seats were held by Democrats and 2 seats were held by Republicans. The general election saw the Democrats gain a single seat, thereby retaining control over the Hawaii Senate and reducing the Republican minority to just a single seat.

== Predictions ==
Source	Ranking	As of
Governing	Safe D	November 1, 2010

== Retirements ==
1. District 15: Norman Sakamoto (D) retired.
2. District 22: Robert Bunda (D) retired.
3. District 25: Fred Hemmings (R) retired.

== Results ==
=== District 2 ===
District 2 election, 2010
Party	Candidate	Votes	%
Democratic	Russell S. Kokubun (incumbent)	13,432	75.41%
Republican	Michael Hale	4,381	24.59%
Total votes		17,813	100.0%
Democratic hold			

=== District 4 ===
District 4 election, 2010
Party	Candidate	Votes	%
Democratic	Shan Tsutsui (incumbent)	10,931	77.84%
Republican	Eric Seibert	3,113	22.16%
Total votes		14,046	100.0%
Democratic hold			

=== District 7 ===
District 7 election, 2010
Party	Candidate	Votes	%
Democratic	Ron Kouchi (incumbent)	14,438	69.81%
Republican	David Hamman	6,245	30.19%
Total votes		20,683	100.0%
Democratic hold			

=== District 8 ===
District 8 election, 2010
Party	Candidate	Votes	%
Republican	Sam Slom (incumbent)	12,318	61.50%
Democratic	Larry Price	7,711	38.50%
Total votes		20,029	100.0%
Republican hold			

=== District 9 ===
District 9 election, 2010
Party	Candidate	Votes	%
Democratic	Les Ihara Jr. (incumbent)	11,058	71.25%
Republican	Lisa Shorba	4,461	28.75%
Total votes		15,519	100.0%
Democratic hold			

=== District 10 ===
District 10 election, 2010
Party	Candidate	Votes	%
Democratic	Brian Taniguchi (incumbent)	10,398	75.15%
Republican	Eric Marshall	3,439	24.85%
Total votes		13,837	100.0%
Democratic hold			

=== District 11 ===
District 11 election, 2010
Party	Candidate	Votes	%
Democratic	Carol Fukunaga (incumbent)		100.0%
Total votes			100.0%
Democratic hold			

=== District 13 ===
District 13 election, 2010
Party	Candidate	Votes	%
Democratic	Suzanne Chun Oakland (incumbent)	10,324	75.45%
Republican	Judy Franklin	3,359	24.55%
Total votes		13,683	100.0%
Democratic hold			

=== District 14 ===
District 14 election, 2010
Party	Candidate	Votes	%
Democratic	Donna Mercado Kim (incumbent)	8,481	82.08%
Republican	Peter Dudek	1,852	17.92%
Total votes		10,333	100.0%
Democratic hold			

=== District 15 ===
District 15 election, 2010
Party	Candidate	Votes	%
Democratic	Glenn Wakai	7,753	67.32%
Republican	Ben Pascua	3,764	32.68%
Total votes		11,517	100.0%
Democratic hold			

=== District 19 ===
District 19 election, 2010
Party	Candidate	Votes	%
Democratic	Mike Gabbard (incumbent)	10,636	74.36%
Republican	Aaron Bonar	3,667	25.64%
Total votes		14,303	100.0%
Democratic hold			

=== District 20 ===
District 20 election, 2010
Party	Candidate	Votes	%
Democratic	Will Espero (incumbent)	7,863	62.03%
Republican	Anel Montes	4,814	37.97%
Total votes		12,677	100.0%
Democratic hold			

=== District 22 ===
District 22 election, 2010
Party	Candidate	Votes	%
Democratic	Donovan Dela Cruz	8,738	70.96%
Republican	Charles Aki	3,576	29.04%
Total votes		12,314	100.0%
Democratic hold			

=== District 24 ===
District 24 election, 2010
Party	Candidate	Votes	%
Democratic	Jill Tokuda (incumbent)	10,010	58.37%
Republican	Tracy Bean	7,140	41.63%
Total votes		17,150	100.0%
Democratic hold			

=== District 25 ===
District 25 election, 2010
Party	Candidate	Votes	%
Democratic	Pohai Ryan	8,777	55.42%
Republican	Virginia Enos	7,061	44.58%
Total votes		15,838	100.0%
Democratic gain from Republican			
