= 2016 Hawaii Senate election =

- November 8, 2016

14 of the 25 seats in the Hawaii Senate 13 seats needed for a majority
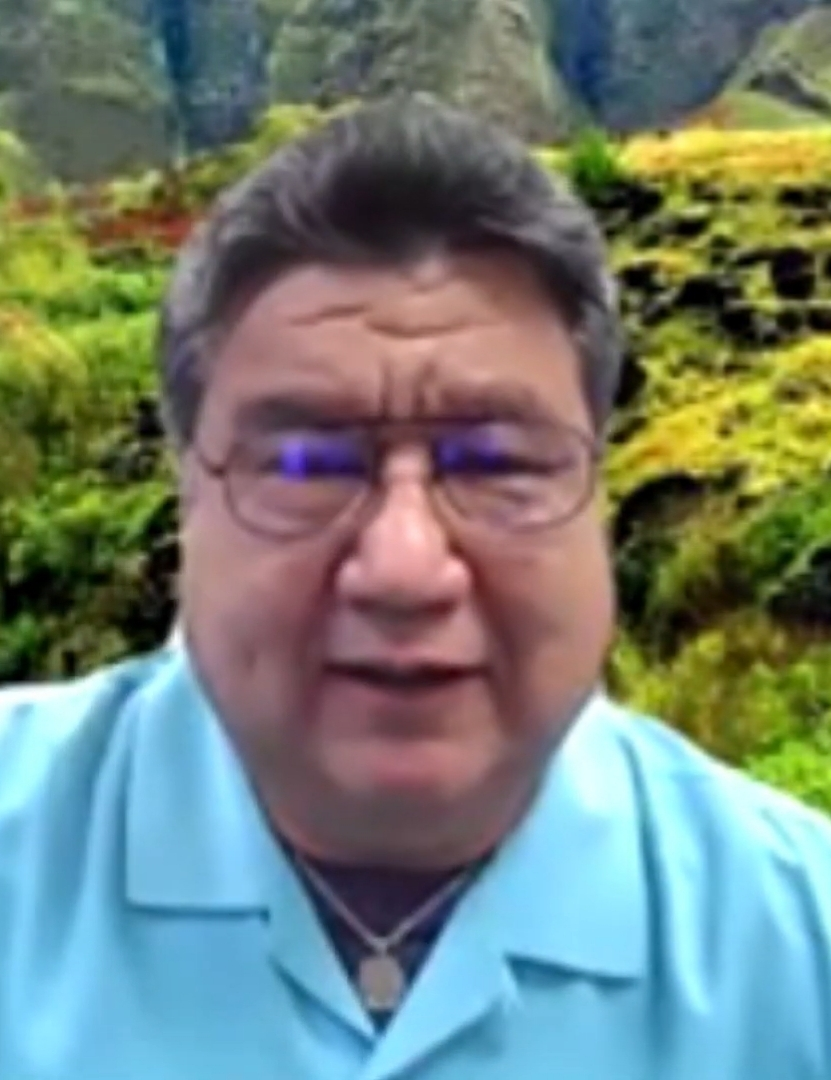

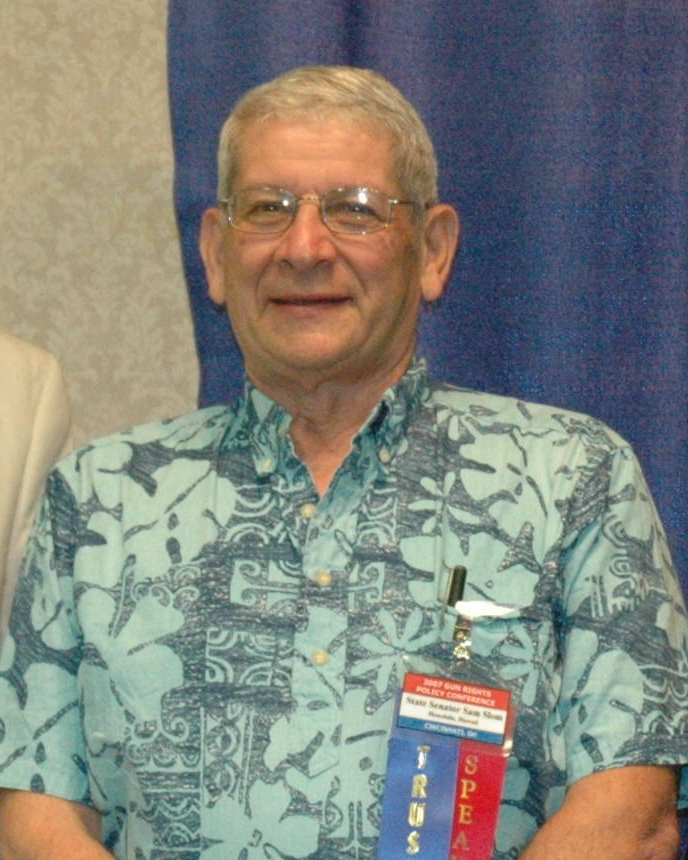
	Majority party	Minority party
Leader	Ron Kouchi	Sam Slom (lost re-election)
Party	Democratic	Republican
Leader's seat	8th District	9th District
Seats before	24	1
Seats after	25	0
Seat change	▲1	▼1
- Results of the elections: Democratic gain Democratic hold No election
President of the Senate before election
Ron Kouchi
Democratic
Elected President of the Senate
Ron Kouchi
Democratic

The 2016 Hawaii Senate elections took place as part of the biennial United States elections. Hawaii voters elected state senators in 14 of the state senate's 25 districts. State senators serve four-year terms in the Hawaii Senate.

The primary election took place on August 13, 2016. The general election also took place on November 8, 2016. Republican Sam Slom lost his bid for re-election, leaving the Democrats with no opposition in the Senate.

== Predictions ==
Source	Ranking	As of
Governing	Safe D	October 12, 2016

== Election results ==
Source for primary results: Source for general election results:

=== District 1 ===
2016 Hawaii's 1st Senate District Democratic Primary special election
Party	Candidate	Votes	%
Democratic	Kaiali‘i Kahele (incumbent)	6,592	55.5%
Democratic	Dennis Onishi	4,037	34.0%
Democratic	Kaloa Robinson	793	6.7%
N/A	Blank Votes	455	3.8%
N/A	Over Votes	8	0.1%
Total votes		11,885	100.0%

2016 Hawaii's 1st Senate District Libertarian Primary special election
Party	Candidate	Votes	%
Libertarian	Kimberly Arianoff	30	88.2%
N/A	Blank Votes	4	11.8%
N/A	Over Votes	0	0.0%
Total votes		34	100.0%

2016 Hawaii's 1st Senate District Special General Election
Party	Candidate	Votes	%
Democratic	Kaiali‘i Kahele (incumbent)	14,488	82.7%
Libertarian	Kimberly Arianoff	1,816	10.4%
N/A	Blank Votes	1,207	6.9%
N/A	Over Votes	1	0.0%
Total votes		17,512	100.0%
Democratic hold			

=== District 2 ===
2016 Hawaii's Senate District Democratic Primary Election
Party	Candidate	Votes	%
Democratic	Russell Ruderman (incumbent)	4,275	52.0%
Democratic	Greggor Ilagan	3,580	43.5%
N/A	Blank Votes	367	4.5%
N/A	Over Votes	7	0.1%
Total votes		8,229	100.0%

2016 Hawaii's 2nd Senate District Libertarian Primary election
Party	Candidate	Votes	%
Libertarian	Frederick F. Fogel	44	81.5%
N/A	Blank Votes	10	18.5%
N/A	Over Votes	0	0.0%
Total votes		54	100.0%

2016 Hawaii's 2nd Senate District General Election
Party	Candidate	Votes	%
Democratic	Russell Ruderman (incumbent)	11,664	76.6%
Libertarian	Frederick F. Fogel	2,488	16.3%
N/A	Blank Votes	1,062	7.0%
N/A	Over Votes	4	0.0%
Total votes		15,218	100.0%
Democratic hold			

=== District 5 ===
2016 Hawaii's 5th Senate District Democratic Primary election
Party	Candidate	Votes	%
Democratic	Gilbert Keith-Agaran (incumbent)	6,224	72.8%
N/A	Blank Votes	2,319	27.1%
N/A	Over Votes	7	0.1%
Total votes		8,550	100.0%

General election
Incumbent Democrat Gilbert Keith-Agaran was automatically reelected without opposition, with no votes recorded.

=== District 8 ===
2016 Hawaii's 8th Senate District Democratic Primary election
Party	Candidate	Votes	%
Democratic	Ron Kouchi (incumbent)	7,817	58.6%
Democratic	Kance Ahuna	4,492	33.7%
N/A	Blank Votes	1,027	7.7%
N/A	Over Votes	6	0.0%
Total votes		13,342	100.0%

General election
Incumbent Democrat Ron Kouchi was automatically reelected without opposition, with no votes recorded.

=== District 9 ===
2016 Hawaii's 9th Senate District Democratic Primary election
Party	Candidate	Votes	%
Democratic	Stanley Chang	7,950	65.4%
Democratic	Michael D. Bennett	2,231	18.4%
Democratic	Richard Y. Kim	524	4.3%
N/A	Blank Votes	1,439	11.8%
N/A	Over Votes	9	0.1%
Total votes		12,153	100.0%

2016 Hawaii's 9th Senate District Republican Primary election
Party	Candidate	Votes	%
Republican	Sam Slom (incumbent)	3,344	86.2%
N/A	Blank Votes	537	13.8%
N/A	Over Votes	0	0.0%
Total votes		3,881	100.0%

2016 Hawaii's 9th Senate District General Election
Party	Candidate	Votes	%
Democratic	Stanley Chang	13,433	50.5%
Republican	Sam Slom (incumbent)	11,985	45.1%
N/A	Blank Votes	1,150	4.3%
N/A	Over Votes	11	0.0%
Total votes		26,579	100.0%
Democratic gain from Republican			

=== District 10 ===
2016 Hawaii's 10th Senate District Democratic Primary election
Party	Candidate	Votes	%
Democratic	Les Ihara Jr. (incumbent)	6,667	69.7%
Democratic	David F. Farrell	1,295	13.5%
N/A	Blank Votes	1,595	16.7%
N/A	Over Votes	4	0.0%
Total votes		9,561	100.0%

2016 Hawaii's Senate District Libertarian Primary election
Party	Candidate	Votes	%
Libertarian	Arnold T. Phillips III	61	92.4%
N/A	Blank Votes	5	7.6%
N/A	Over Votes	0	0.0%
Total votes		66	100.0%

2016 Hawaii's 10th Senate District General Election
Party	Candidate	Votes	%
Democratic	Les Ihara Jr. (incumbent)	13,845	70.0%
Libertarian	Arnold T. Phillips III	2,712	13.7%
N/A	Blank Votes	3,224	16.3%
N/A	Over Votes	6	0.0%
Total votes		19,787	100.0%
Democratic hold			

=== District 11 ===
2016 Hawaii's 11th Senate Democratic District Primary election
Party	Candidate	Votes	%
Democratic	Brian Taniguchi (incumbent)	8,235	75.6%
N/A	Blank Votes	2,650	24.3%
N/A	Over Votes	2	0.0%
Total votes		10,887	100.0%

2016 Hawaii's 11th Senate District Republican Primary election
Party	Candidate	Votes	%
Republican	Kaul Jochanan C. Amsterdam	677	41.6%
N/A	Blank Votes	2	3.2%
N/A	Over Votes	0	0.0%
Total votes		679	100.0%

2016 Hawaii's 11th Senate District Libertarian Primary election
Party	Candidate	Votes	%
Libertarian	Joe Kent	60	96.8%
N/A	Blank Votes	2	3.2%
N/A	Over Votes	0	0.0
Total votes		62	100.0%

Hawaii's 11th Senate District General election
Party	Candidate	Votes	%
Democratic	Brian Taniguchi (incumbent)	14,943	70.0%
Republican	Kaul Jochanan C. Amsterdam	3,416	16.0%
Libertarian	Joe Kent	791	3.7%
N/A	Blank Votes	2,186	10.2%
N/A	Over Votes	10	0.0%
Total votes		21,346	100.0%
Democratic hold			

=== District 13 ===
2016 Hawaii's 13th Senate District Democratic Primary election
Party	Candidate	Votes	%
Democratic	Karl Rhoads	3,606	41.8%
Democratic	Kim Coco Iwamoto	2,530	29.4%
Democratic	Keone Nakoa	1,865	21.6%
N/A	Blank Votes	612	7.1%
N/A	Over Votes	7	0.1%
Total votes		8,620	100.0%

2016 Hawaii's 13th Senate District Republican Primary election
Party	Candidate	Votes	%
Republican	Rod Tam	896	59.4%
N/A	Blank Votes	612	40.6%
N/A	Over Votes	0	0.0%
Total votes		1,508	100.0%

2016 Hawaii's 13th Senate District Libertarian Primary election
Party	Candidate	Votes	%
Libertarian	Harry Ozols	38	92.7%
N/A	Blank Votes	3	7.3%
N/A	Over Votes	0	0.0%
Total votes		41	100.0%

2016 Hawaii's 13th Senate District General election
Party	Candidate	Votes	%
Democratic	Karl Rhoads	10,815	66.1%
Republican	Rod Tam	3,826	23.4%
Libertarian	Harry Ozols	593	3.5%
N/A	Blank Votes	1,112	6.8%
N/A	Over Votes	16	0.1%
Total votes		16,362	100.0%
Democratic hold			

=== District 14 ===
2016 Hawaii's 14th Senate District Democratic Primary election
Party	Candidate	Votes	%
Democratic	Donna Mercado Kim (incumbent)	5,904	78.3%
Democratic	Carl Campagna	1,012	13.4%
N/A	Blank Votes	616	8.2%
N/A	Over Votes	11	0.1%
Total votes		7,543	100.0%

General election
Incumbent Democrat Donna Mercado Kim was automatically reelected without opposition, with no votes recorded.

=== District 15 ===
2016 Hawaii's 15th Senate District Democratic Primary election
Party	Candidate	Votes	%
Democratic	Glenn Wakai (incumbent)	4,047	73.3%
N/A	Blank Votes	1,470	26.6%
N/A	Over Votes	2	0.0%
Total votes		5,519	100.0%

2016 Hawaii's 15th Senate District Libertarian Primary election
Party	Candidate	Votes	%
Libertarian	Roman Kalinowski	24	82.8%
N/A	Blank Votes	5	17.2%
N/A	Over Votes	0	0.0%
Total votes		29	100.0%

2016 Hawaii's 15th Senate District General Election
Party	Candidate	Votes	%
Democratic	Glenn Wakai (incumbent)	9,226	74.3%
Libertarian	Roman Kalinowski	1,711	13.8%
N/A	Blank Votes	1,475	11.9%
N/A	Over Votes	2	0.0%
Total votes		12,414	100.0%
Democratic hold			

=== District 19 ===
2016 Hawaii's 19th Senate District Democratic Primary election
Party	Candidate	Votes	%
Democratic	Will Espero (incumbent)	3,631	80.4%
N/A	Blank Votes	882	19.5%
N/A	Over Votes	1	0.0%
Total votes		4,514	100.0%

2016 Hawaii's 19th Senate District Republican Primary election
Party	Candidate	Votes	%
Republican	Kurt Fevella	989	50.0%
Republican	Chris Fidelibus	650	32.9%
N/A	Blank Votes	337	17.0%
N/A	Over Votes	2	0.1%
Total votes		1,978	100.0%

2016 Hawaii's 19th Senate District General Election
Party	Candidate	Votes	%
Democratic	Will Espero (incumbent)	7,880	58.4%
Republican	Kurt Fevella	4,912	36.4%
N/A	Blank Votes	694	5.1%
N/A	Over Votes	9	0.1%
Total votes		5,615	100.0%
Democratic hold			

=== District 20 ===
2016 Hawaii's 20th Senate District Democratic Primary election
Party	Candidate	Votes	%
Democratic	Mike Gabbard (incumbent)	3,759	77.2%
N/A	Blank Votes	1,110	22.8%
N/A	Over Votes	1	0.0%
Total votes		4,870	100.0%

General election
Incumbent Democrat Mike Gabbard was automatically reelected without opposition, with no votes recorded.

=== District 22 ===
2016 Hawaii's 20th Senate District Democratic Primary election
Party	Candidate	Votes	%
Democratic	Donovan Dela Cruz (incumbent)	4,902	78.1%
N/A	Blank Votes	1,373	21.9%
N/A	Over Votes	1	0.0%
Total votes		6,276	100.0%

General election
Incumbent Democrat Donovan Dela Cruz was automatically reelected without opposition, with no votes recorded.

=== District 25 ===
2016 Hawaii's 25th Senate District Democratic Primary election
Party	Candidate	Votes	%
Democratic	Laura Thielen (incumbent)	7,003	76.0%
N/A	Blank Votes	2,206	23.9%
N/A	Over Votes	6	0.1%
Total votes		9,215	100.0%

2016 Hawaii's 25th Senate District Republican Primary election
Party	Candidate	Votes	%
Republican	Robert K. Nagamine	1,610	43.2%
Republican	Heather Dozier	866	23.2%
N/A	Blank Votes	1,248	33.5%
N/A	Over Votes	1	0.0%
Total votes		3,725	100.0%

2016 Hawaii's 25th Senate District General Election
Party	Candidate	Votes	%
Democratic	Laura Thielen (incumbent)	14,212	63.5%
Republican	Robert K. Nagamine	6,886	30.8%
N/A	Blank Votes	1,260	5.6%
N/A	Over Votes	7	0.0%
Total votes		22,365	100.0%
Democratic hold			
