= Jon Yoshimura =

Member of the Hawaiʻi Senate from the 19th district
- In office July 30, 2018 – November 5, 2018
- Appointed by: David Ige
- Preceded by: Will Espero
- Succeeded by: Kurt Fevella

Personal details
- Party: Democratic
- Education: University of Hawaiʻi at Mānoa; William S. Richardson School of Law

Jon Yoshimura is an American attorney and government affairs professional focused on land use and renewal energy development. He served as a member of the Hawaiʻi State Senate from July to November 2018. He was previously chairman and a member of the Honolulu City Council.

== Education ==
Yoshimura earned a bachelor's degree in journalism from the University of Hawaiʻi at Mānoa and a J.D. from the William S. Richardson School of Law.

== Career ==
Yoshimura served as communications director for Senator Daniel Akaka and as a reporter for KHON-2. He has also been a member and chairman of the Honolulu City Council until 2002. He was first elected to the state senate in 2002 from the newly created 12th district.

In 2012, he was a candidate for city council to complete the remaining two years of Tulsi Gabbard's term following her election to Congress, a campaign won by Carol Fukunaga.

Prior to being appointed to the State Senate in 2018, Yoshimura worked in the private sector in government affairs for Tesla and SolarCity Hawai’i. He was then appointed by Governor David Ige to fill a vacancy in the Hawaiʻi State Senate from July to November 2018. He was not a candidate in the November election for a full term.
