= Isaac Choy =

American politician

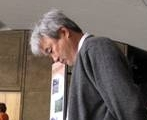
- Choy in 2010

Member of the Hawaii House of Representatives from the 23rd district 24th (2008–2012)
- In office November 2008 – November 6, 2018
- Preceded by: Kirk Caldwell
- Succeeded by: Dale Kobayashi

Personal details
- Party: Democratic
- Education: San Jose State University
- Website: friendsforisaacchoy.com

Military service
- Branch/service: United States Marine Corps
- Years of service: 1971–1973

Isaac William Choy is an American politician and a former Democratic member of the Hawaii House of Representatives representing District 23 from November 2012 to November 2018. Choy consecutively served from 2008 until 2012 in the District 24 seat. In 2020, Choy was appointed to serve as director of the state Department of Taxation.

Choy later served as vice president of finance for the Hawaii Tourism Authority. He was placed on unpaid leave in May 2025 for allegations of racist and sexist remarks. In September 2025, Choy was fired by Governor Josh Green's chief-of-staff Brooke Wilson. Choy sued for wrongful termination and was awarded $500,000 after it was determined he was fired for retaliation after revealing contract violations and payment issues.

== Education ==
Choy earned his BS in business administration from San Jose State University.

== Elections ==
- 2012 Redistricted to District 23, and with Democratic Representative Tom Brower redistricted to District 22, Choy and his 2010 Republican challenger Zach Thompson were both unopposed for their August 11, 2012 primaries, setting up a rematch; Choy won the November 6, 2012 General election with 7,502 votes (71.9%) against Thompson.
- 2008 When Democratic Representative Kirk Caldwell retired from the Legislature to run for mayor of Honolulu and left the District 24 seat open, Choy was unopposed for the September 20, 2008 Democratic Primary, winning with 3,021 votes, and won the November 4, 2008 General election with 6,689 votes (62.4%) against Republican nominee Jerilyn Jeffryes.
- 2010 Choy won the September 18, 2010 Democratic Primary with 3,658 votes (53.8%), and won the November 2, 2010 General election with 6,545 votes (70.4%) against Republican nominee Zach Thompson.

== State microbe legislation ==
In 2017 Isaac Choy submitted legislation in the Hawaiʻi House of Representatives to make Flavobacterium akiainvivens the state microbe. This was mirrored by Brian Taniguchi in the Hawaiʻi Senate. This continues an effort started by James Tokioka in 2013, and later contested in 2014 by Senator Glenn Wakai's SB3124 bill proposing Aliivibrio fischeri instead. As of December 2017, Hawaiʻi has no official state microbe.
