= Senator Trimble (disambiguation) =

William A. Trimble (1786–1821), U.S. Senator from Ohio from 1819 to 1821. Senator Trimble may also refer to:

- Allen Trimble (1783–1870), Ohio State Senate
- Gordon Trimble (born 1944), Hawaii State Senate
- Henry Hoffman Trimble (1827–1910), Iowa State Senate
- John Trimble (politician) (1812–1884), Tennessee State Senate
