= Flavobacterium akiainvivens =

Scientific classification
- Domain: Bacteria
- Kingdom: Pseudomonadati
- Phylum: Bacteroidota
- Class: Flavobacteriia
- Order: Flavobacteriales
- Family: Flavobacteriaceae
- Genus: Flavobacterium
- Species: F. akiainvivens

Binomial name
- Flavobacterium akiainvivens Iris Kuo, Jimmy Saw, Durrell D. Kapan, Stephanie Christensen, Kenneth Y. Kaneshiro, Stuart P. Donachie, 2013

Species of bacterium

Flavobacterium akiainvivens, or koʻohonua ʻili akia, (literally "ʻākia bark bacteria") is a species of gram-negative bacteria in the Flavobacteriaceae family. The specific epithet akiainvivens is Latin (akia in vivens) and literally means "living on or in ʻākia." It was isolated originally from decaying wood of the endemic Hawai'ian shrub ʻākia (Wikstroemia oahuensis).

Flavobacterium akiainvivens was discovered by Iris Kuo when she was just a high school student at ʻIolani School. She and her coauthors determined that it shares a clade with Flavobacterium rivuli and Flavobacterium subsaxonicum.

== Description ==
Grown on R2a agar, colonies are off-white or cream, around 2-3mm in diameter, mucoid and translucent. Cells are gram-negative 0.4 by 2 μm rods. The cells are without any gliding motility and the genome revealed no flagella or chemotaxis systems. It is catalase-positive, oxidase-negative, and can not reduce nitrate. The species expresses caseinase, lipase, and amylase, but can digest neither cellulose nor DNA. It can grow both aerobically and microaerophilically but not anaerobically. The primary carotenoid is zeaxanthin, but it does not have any flexirubin-type pigments. The DNA G+C content for the type strain is 44.2 mol%.

== State microbe status ==
In early 2013, state representative James Tokioka submitted HB 293 HD1 to establish F. akiainvivens as the state microbe of Hawaiʻi. At the time, no other U.S. states had a microorganism as a state symbol. However, on 29 May 2013 Oregon officially designated Saccharomyces cerevisiae as the official microbe of the state, making it the first in the nation. Meanwhile, the Hawaiʻian legislation was deferred for a year when it encountered competition from Senator Glenn Wakai's SB3124 proposing Aliivibrio fischeri. In 2017, legislation similar to the original 2013 F. akiainvivens bill was submitted in the Hawaiʻi House of Representatives by Isaac Choy and in the Hawaiʻi Senate by Brian Taniguchi.

== See also ==
- List of Hawaii state symbols
