= Ezra Kanoho =

American politician (1927–2022)

Member of the Hawaii House of Representatives from the 15th district
- In office 1987–2006
- Appointed by: John Waihee
- Succeeded by: James Tokioka

Personal details
- Born: September 16, 1927 Lihue, Hawaii
- Died: January 23, 2022 (aged 94) Lihue, Hawaii
- Party: Democratic
- Education: Kamehameha Schools

Ezra R. Kanoho (September 16, 1927 – January 23, 2022) was an American politician who served in the Hawaii State Legislature from 1987 to 2006.

== Early life and education ==
Kanoho was born on September 16, 1927, in Lihue, Kauai. He graduated from Kamehameha Schools in 1945, and went on to attend Kauai Community College and Honolulu Community College. After earning an associate degree, he worked for Hawaii Telephone Company. He also served in several community organizations. He had a wife and four children.

== Career ==
Kanoho was appointed to office by John Waihee in 1987 and was re-elected in 1988. He served on several committees including the committee on water, land, use, and Hawaiian affairs, the finance committee, the judiciary committee, the consumer protection and commerce committee, and the committee for energy and environmental protection. He was also part of the Hawaiian Caucus.

Kanoho retired in 2006. He died of heart failure on January 23, 2022.
