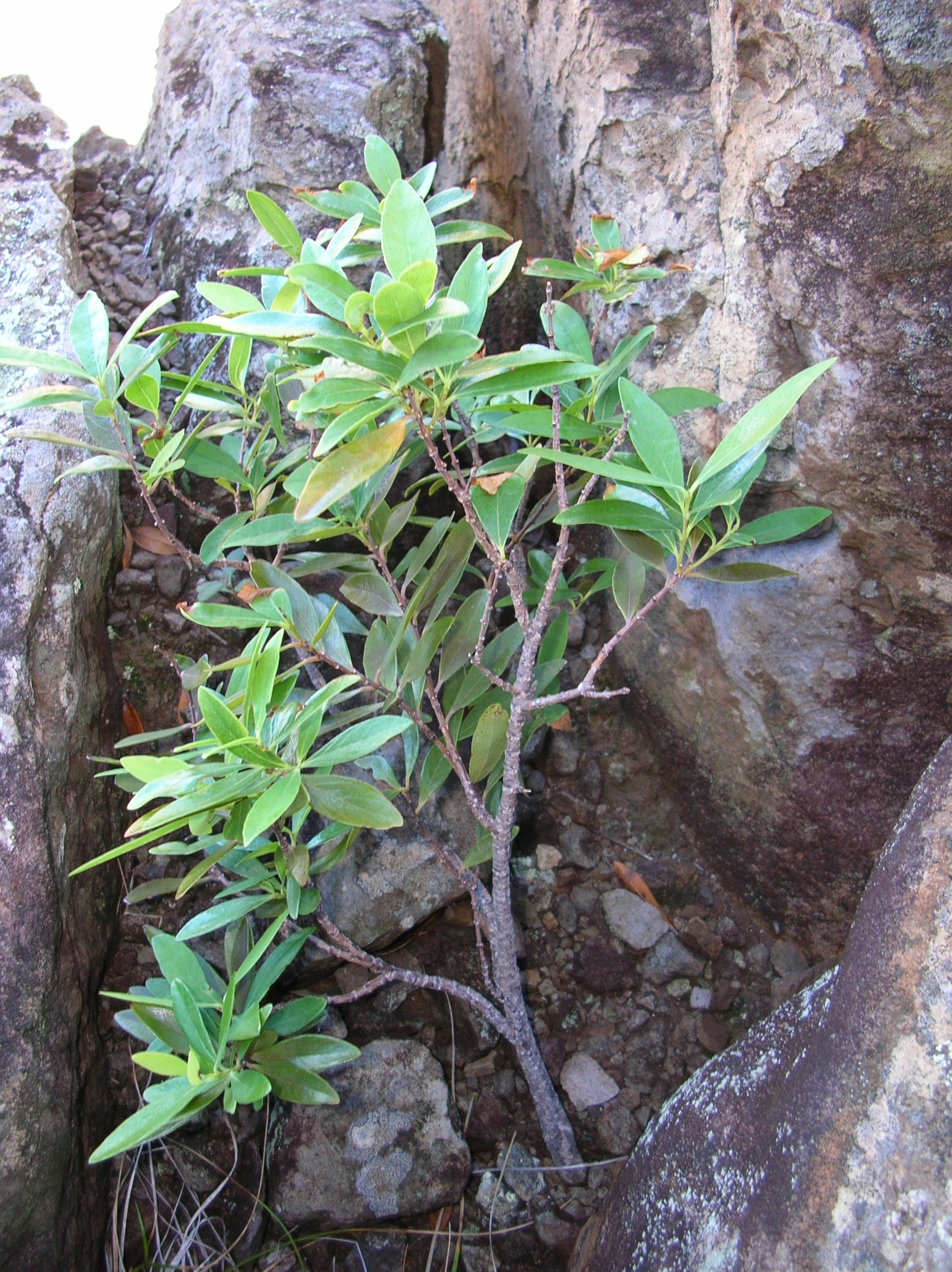
- ʻĀkia; Oʻahu false ohelo

Scientific classification
- Kingdom: Plantae
- Clade: Tracheophytes
- Clade: Angiosperms
- Clade: Eudicots
- Clade: Rosids
- Order: Malvales
- Family: Thymelaeaceae
- Genus: Wikstroemia
- Species: W. oahuensis

Binomial name
- Wikstroemia oahuensis (A.Gray) Rock 1913

Varieties
- Wikstroemia oahuensis var. oahuensis; Wikstroemia oahuensis var. palustris (Hochr.) B.Peterson 1989

Synonyms
- Daphne oahuensis (A.Gray) Halda; Diplomorpha oahuensis (A.Gray) A. Heller; Wikstroemia foetida var. oahuensis A.Gray

= Wikstroemia oahuensis =

Species of shrub

Wikstroemia oahuensis, the ʻĀkia or Oʻahu false ohelo, is a species of flowering shrub in the mezereon family, Thymelaeaceae, that is endemic to Hawaiʻi.

== Description ==
In the wild, ʻākia can grow to 5 feet (1.5 m) tall, but in cultivation it usually reaches 3 feet (0.91 m) with a diameter of 10 feet (3.0 m). The young branches are gray, yellow, or reddish brown. The leaves grow with two leaves opposite each other on the branch, overlapping, and are dark green or grayish on the upper surface and lighter green underneath. They are oval to round and usually under 1 inch (2.5 cm) long. This species is highly variable, with the leaves ranging from large and long to small and round. The stems do not snap but peel when bent. It flowers irregularly throughout the year, but produces fewer flowers when the plant has mature fruit. The tubular yellow to yellow-green flowers may be perfect (bisexual) or unisexual (either male or female), and less than 0.5 inches (1.3 cm) long. The dwarf bog form from Kauaʻi is sometimes recognized as a separate species, W. palustris.

== Distribution ==
There are 12 Wikstroemia species endemic to the Hawaiian Islands. Wikstroemia oahuensis is a relatively common plant in a wide variety of habitats on the islands of Kauaʻi, Oʻahu, Molokaʻi, Lānaʻi, and Maui. It inhabits ridges and rocky areas, hala (Pandanus tectorius) forest, mesic forest, wet forest, and bogs at elevations of 100–1,400 metres (330–4,590 ft).

== Ecology ==
The bacteria species Flavobacterium akiainvivens was originally isolated from rotting ʻakia wood, and the shrub lends it its name.

== Uses ==
=== Toxicity ===
Native Hawaiians used this species to stupefy fish. A poison made from ʻākia, in combination with other plants, was used to execute criminals.

=== Medicinal ===
Hawaiian medicinal uses are as a laxative and for treatment of asthma. Possible anti-tumor activity.

=== Other ===
ʻĀkia is used in Hawaiʻi as landscape specimen. Seeds and flowers are used to make beautiful lei.
