= Gordon Trimble =

American politician

Member of the Hawaii Senate from the 12th district
- In office November 5, 2002 – November 4, 2008
- Preceded by: Redistricted
- Succeeded by: Brickwood Galuteria

Personal details
- Born: April 27, 1944 (age 82) Berkeley, California
- Party: Republican
- Education: Rutgers University; University of Hawaii at Manoa

Gordon M. Trimble, a member of the United States Republican Party, represents the 12th Senatorial District in the Hawaii State Senate of the Hawaii State Legislature. The 12th Senatorial District includes the Kapahulu, Waikiki, Ala Moana, Kakaako and Downtown areas on the island of Oahu. Democrat Robert Brooks was Sen. Trimble's challenger in the 2006 elections.

Trimble has BA degree in economics from Rutgers University and an MA degree in economics from the University of Hawaii at Manoa. From 1974 to 2000, Trimble was an Economist, Trade Representative and Administrator for Foreign-Trade Zone #9, for the Hawaii State Department of Business and Economic Development. From 1973 to 1974, Trimble was a Research Assistant for the Hawaii State Commission on Operations, Revenues & Expenditures.

Born April 27, 1944, Trimble has been a Hawaii resident since 1969. He is married and has a son. He is the younger brother of Charles Trimble, founder of Trimble Inc.

== Member of the following Senate committees ==
- Energy and Environment
- Tourism and Government Operations

== Sources ==
This article incorporates text from Gordon Trimble at dKosopedia under the terms of the GNU Free Documentation License.

Hawaii Senate
Preceded by Carol Fukunaga	Member of the Hawaii Senate from the 12th district 2002–2008	Succeeded by Brickwood Galuteria
