= Brian Taniguchi =

American politician

Member of the Hawaii Senate
- In office November 8, 1994 – November 8, 2022
- Preceded by: Ann Kobayashi
- Succeeded by: Carol Fukunaga
- Constituency: 11th district (1994–2002); 10th district (2002–2012); 11th district (2012–2022)

Member of the Hawaii House of Representatives
- In office November 4, 1980 – November 8, 1994
- Succeeded by: Ed Case
- Constituency: 13th district (1980–1982); 18th district (1982–1984); 27th district (1984–1992); 23rd district (1992–1994)

Personal details
- Born: November 7, 1951 (age 74) Honolulu, Hawaii, U.S.
- Party: Democratic
- Education: University of Hawaii at Manoa; William S. Richardson School of Law
- Profession: Lawyer

Brian Tetsuji Taniguchi (born November 7, 1951, in Honolulu, Hawaii) is an American politician and a former Democratic member of the Hawaii Senate from January 16, 2013, to January 16, 2023, representing District 10. Taniguchi served consecutively from 1995 until 2013 in the District 10 and District 11 seats, having served consecutively in the Hawaii State Legislature from 1981 until 1995 in the Hawaii House of Representatives. He served a combined 42 years in the state legislature.

Taniguchi did not seek re-election in the 2022 Hawaii Senate election.

== Education ==
Taniguchi attended University of Hawaii at Manoa and earned his JD from its William S. Richardson School of Law.

== Elections ==
- 1980 Taniguchi was initially elected the Hawaii House of Representatives in the November 4, 1980, General election.
- 1982 Taniguchi was re-elected in the November 2, 1982, General election.
- 1984 Taniguchi was re-elected in the November 6, 1984, General election
- 1986 Taniguchi was re-elected in the November 4, 1986, General election.
- 1988 Taniguchi was re-elected in the November 8, 1988, General election.
- 1990 Taniguchi was re-elected in the November 6, 1990, General election.
- 1992 Taniguchi was unopposed for the House District 23 September 19, 1992, Democratic Primary, winning with 3,955 votes, and won the November 3, 1992, General election with 7,368 votes (77.4%) against Libertarian candidate Roger Taylor.
- 1994 Taniguchi was unopposed for the Senate District 11 September 17, 1994, Democratic Primary, winning with 7,079 votes, and won the November 8, 1994, General election with 10,357 votes (68.6%) against Republican nominee Jeff Tom.
- 1996 Taniguchi won the September 21, 1996, Democratic Primary with 6,369 votes (71.7%), and won the November 5, 1996, General election with 10,309 votes (69.7%) against Republican nominee John James.
- 2000 Taniguchi won the September 23, 2000, Democratic Primary with 6,008 votes (71.8%), and won the November 5, 2002, General election with 9,217 votes (68.8%) against Republican nominee Billy Fulton.
- 2002 Redistricted to District 10, and with Democratic Senator Les Ihara Jr. redistricted to District 9, Taniguchi was unopposed for the September 21, 2002, Democratic Primary, winning with 6,338 votes, and won the November 5, 2002, General election with 11,328 votes (61.1%) against Republican nominee Gladys Hayes.
- 2006 Taniguchi was unopposed for both the September 26, 2006, Democratic Primary, winning with 8,233 votes, and the November 7, 2006, General election.
- 2010 Taniguchi was unopposed for the September 18, 2010, Democratic Primary, winning with 7,778 votes, and won the November 2, 2010, General election with 10,398 votes (69.0%) against Republican nominee Eric Marshall.
- 2012 Redistricted back to District 11, Taniguchi directly faced fellow Democratic Senator Carol Fukunaga; Taniguchi won the August 11, 2012, Democratic Primary with 6,527 votes (52.0%), and won the November 6, 2012, General election with 15,639 votes (73.5%) against Republican nominee Larry Fenton.

== State microbe legislation ==
In 2017 Taniguchi submitted legislation in the Hawaiʻi Senate to make Flavobacterium akiainvivens the state microbe. This was mirrored by Isaac Choy in the Hawaiʻi House of Representatives. This continues an effort started by James Tokioka in 2013, and later contested in 2014 by Senator Glenn Wakai's SB3124 bill proposing Aliivibrio fischeri instead. As of December 2017, Hawaiʻi has no official state microbe.

== Honors ==
- Order of the Rising Sun, Gold Rays with Rosette (2023)
