= Norman Sakamoto =

American politician

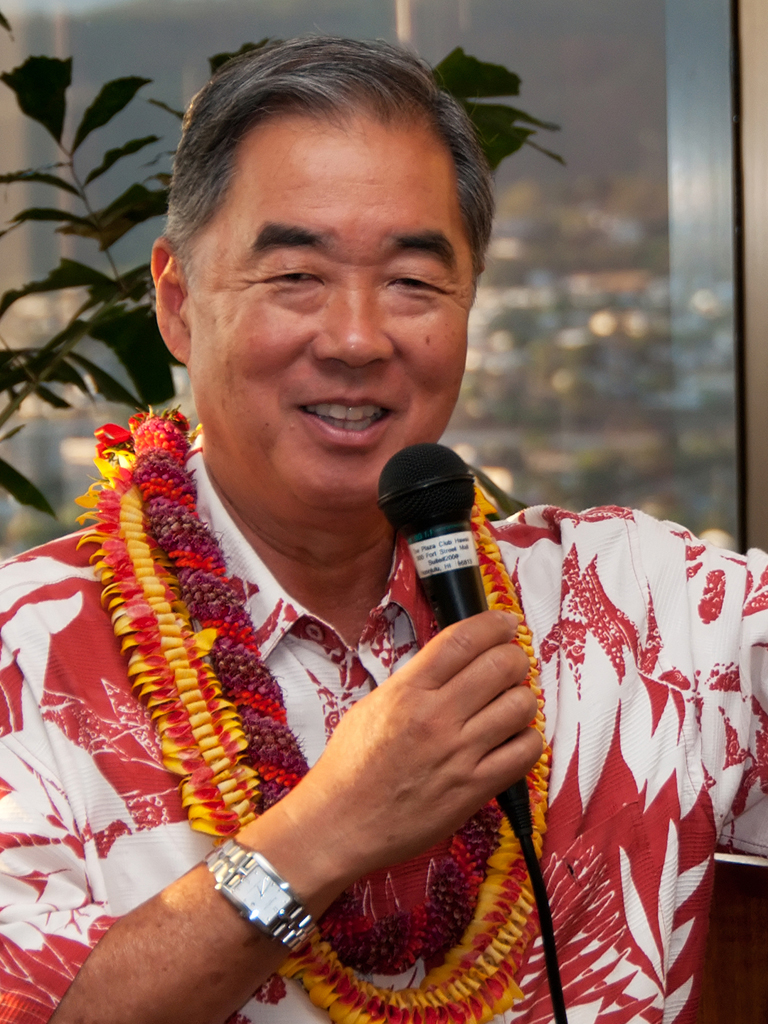
- Sakamoto in 2010

Member of the Hawaii Senate from the 15th district 16th (1996–2002)
- In office November 1996 – November 2010
- Preceded by: Reynaldo Graulty
- Succeeded by: Glenn Wakai

Personal details
- Born: May 22, 1947 (age 79) Honolulu, Hawaii, U.S.
- Party: Democratic
- Spouse: Penny Sakamoto
- Education: University of Hawaiʻi at Mānoa; University of Illinois Urbana-Champaign
- Profession: Civil Engineer
- Website: normansakamoto.com

Norman Sakamoto (born May 22, 1947) is an American politician who served as a Democratic member of the Hawaii Senate from 1996 to 2010. He represented Hawaii Senatorial District 15, comprising the communities of Aliamanu, Foster Village, Halawa, Hickam, Kalihi, Lower Aiea, Mapunapuna, Moanalua, Pearlridge, and Salt Lake on the island of Oahu. He is a former candidate for Lieutenant Governor of Hawaii.

Sakamoto was the chairman of the Senate Education And Housing Committee, the Vice-Chair of the Higher Education Committee, and a member of the Commerce and Consumer Protection Committee. He previously served as the chairman of the Education & Military Affairs Committee, the Majority Policy Leader, the chairman of the Education Committee, Majority Whip, and Majority Floor Leader.

== Early years ==
Sakamoto was born in Honolulu, attended Palolo Elementary School and graduated from University Laboratory School. He graduated from the University of Hawaiʻi at Mānoa with a BS in Civil Engineering in 1969. He graduated from the University of Illinois Urbana-Champaign with a master's degree in Civil Engineering in 1970.

== Career ==
Sakamoto is a registered civil engineer and a licensed general contractor, and worked for the City and County of Los Angeles and the United States Army Corps of Engineers. He returned to Hawaii in 1973, joined his family's construction firm, and then formed SC Pacific Corp in 1985 with architect Vaughn Miyauchi. In 1994, he was elected President of the Building Industry Association of Hawaii.

== Hawaii Senate ==
In November 1996, Sakamoto was elected to the Hawaii Senate from the 15th District. The 15th District includes Aliamanu, Foster Village, Halawa, Hickam, Kalihi, Lower Aiea, Mapunapuna, Moanalua, Pearlridge, and Salt Lake. He has been re-elected three times. In the Senate, Sakamoto has taken credit for The Reinventing Education Act of 2004, the Hawaii 2050 Sustainability Initiative, and a ban on children riding in the back of pickup trucks. He serves on the UH Board of Regents Candidate Advisory Council.

== 2010 Hawaii State Lt. Governor Campaign ==
Senator Sakamoto ran for Lieutenant Governor of the State of Hawaii in the 2010 Hawaii Lt. Gubernatorial Election. He lost the Democratic Primary Election on September 18, 2010.
