= James Tokioka =

American politician

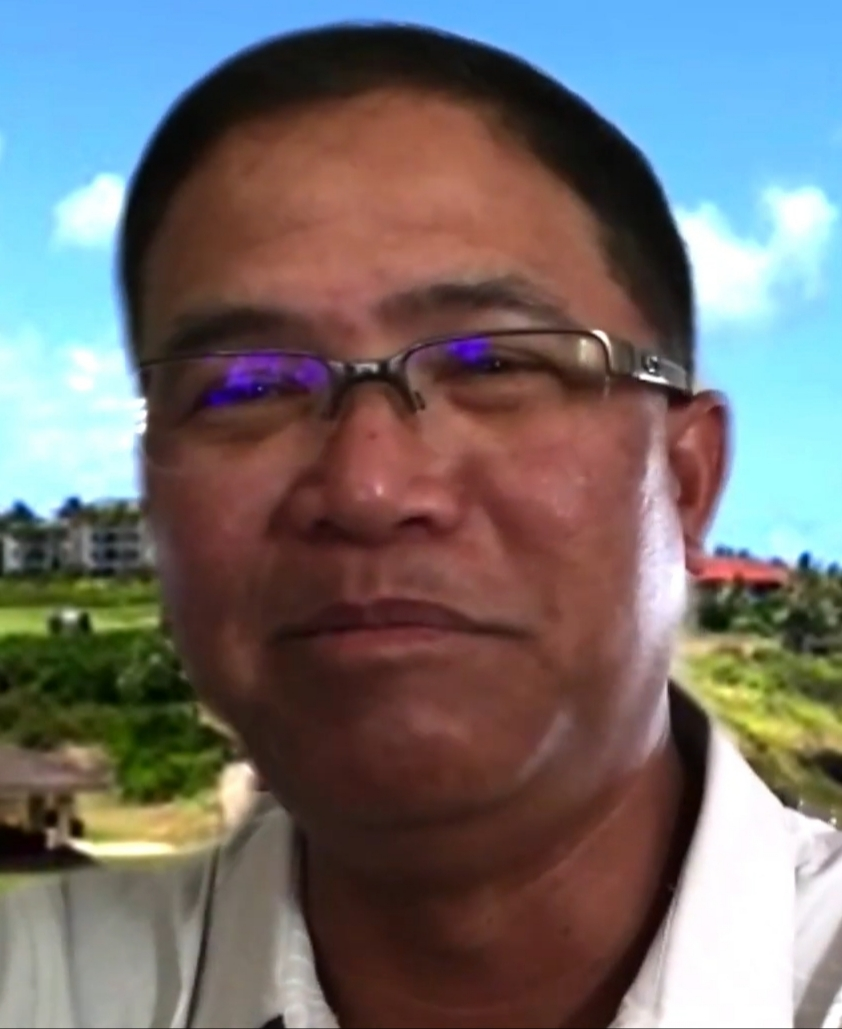

Member of the Hawaii House of Representatives from the 16th district 15th (2006–2022)
- In office November 8, 2006 – January 2, 2023
- Preceded by: Ezra Kanoho
- Succeeded by: Luke Evslin

Personal details
- Party: Democratic

James "Jimmy" Kunane Tokioka is an American politician and was a Democratic member of the Hawaii House of Representatives from November 2006 to January 2023, most recently representing District 16. He currently serves as the director of the Department of Business, Economic Development, and Tourism of Hawaiʻi in the cabinet of Governor Josh Green.

== Career ==
Before entering politics, Tokioka owned a restaurant. He entered politics in 1996, when we was elected to the Kauaʻi County Council. He served in that role until 2006.

When Democratic Representative Ezra Kanoho retired in 2006 and left the District 15 seat open, Tokioka won the September 26, 2006 Democratic Primary with 2,965 votes (53.4%), and won the November 7, 2006 General election with 4,280 votes (56.1%) against Republican nominee Ron Agor. In 2008 Tokioka was unopposed for both the September 20, 2008 Democratic Primary, winning with 3,203 votes, and the November 4, 2008 General election. Tokioka won the September 18, 2010 Democratic Primary with 3,569 votes (65.6%), and won the November 2, 2010 General election with 5,855 votes (71.0%) against Republican nominee Larry Fillhart. In 2012 Tokioka was unopposed for both the August 11, 2012 Democratic Primary, winning with 3,486 votes, and the November 6, 2012 General election. In 2014 Tokioka was re-elected with nearly 74% of the vote in the general election against Steve Yoder after getting by novice candidate Dylan Hooser with 63% of the votes compared to Hooser's showing of 30%.

In early 2013, Tokioka submitted HB 293 HD1 to establish Flavobacterium akiainvivens as the state microbe of Hawaiʻi. At the time, no other U.S. states had a microorganism as a state symbol. However, on 29 May 2013 Oregon officially designated Saccharomyces cerevisiae as the official microbe of the state, making it the first in the nation. Meanwhile, the Hawaiian legislation was deferred for a year when it encountered competition from Senator Glenn Wakai's SB3124 proposing Aliivibrio fischeri.

In 2015 James Tokioka was charged with misdemeanor "Failure to file a complete and accurate candidate committee report" for finance reports filed during his 2014 campaign. He pleaded no contest to the misdemeanor charge on August 31, 2015, and was granted a deferment of his plea. Tokioka concealed $27,489 in campaign contributions for nineteen days after filing false campaign finance reports during the 2014 primaries in order to win re-election.

Tokioka was reelected to a two-year term in the 2022 Hawaiʻi House of Representatives election, but resigned on January 2, 2023 to accept an appointment as director of the Department of Business, Economic Development, and Tourism in Governor Josh Green's cabinet. Gov. Green appointed Kauaʻi County Councilmember Luke Evslin to the District 16 seat on February 15, 2023.
