= Carol Fukunaga =

American lawyer and politician

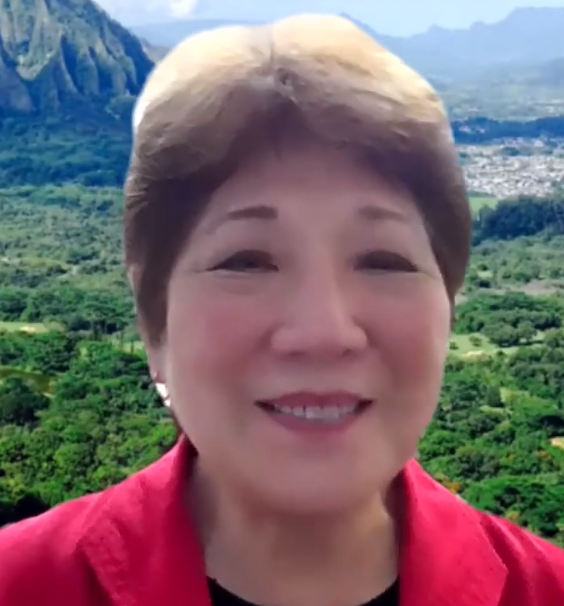
- Fukunaga in 2021

Member of the Hawaii Senate from the 11th district
- Incumbent
- Assumed office November 8, 2022
- Preceded by: Brian Taniguchi

Member of the Honolulu City Council from the 6th district
- In office November 27, 2012 – November 6, 2022
- Preceded by: Tulsi Gabbard
- Succeeded by: Tyler Dos Santos-Tam

Member of the Hawaii Senate from the 11th district
- In office November 2002 – November 6, 2012
- Preceded by: Brian Taniguchi
- Succeeded by: Brian Taniguchi

Member of the Hawaii Senate
- In office November 1992 – November 2002
- Preceded by: Steve Cobb
- Succeeded by: Gordon Trimble

Member of the Hawaii House of Representatives
- In office November 1987 – November 1992
- Preceded by: Russell Blair
- Succeeded by: Nathan Suzuki

Member of the Hawaii House of Representatives
- In office November 1979 – November 1982
- Preceded by: Neil Abercrombie; Hiram Fong Jr.
- Succeeded by: Frederick Rohlfing

Personal details
- Born: December 12, 1947 (age 78) Honolulu, Hawaii
- Party: Democratic
- Education: University of Hawaii, William S. Richardson School of Law

Carol A. Fukunaga (born December 12, 1947) is an American lawyer and politician. Fukunaga is a member of the Hawaii State Senate from the 11th District and has served in various elected offices since 1978.

== Early life and education ==
Born in Honolulu, Hawaii, Fukunaga received her bachelor's degree from the University of Hawaiʻi at Mānoa and her Juris Doctor degree from the William S. Richardson School of Law.

== Career ==
Fukunaga practiced law in Honolulu. Fukunaga served in the Hawaii Constitutional Convention of 1978. She then served in the Hawaii House of Representatives from 1978 to 1982 and from 1986 to 1992 and was a Democrat. From 1982 to 1986, Fukunaga served as the executive officer for the Lieutenant Governor of Hawaii. Fukunaga served in the Hawaii Senate from 1992 to 2012. From 2012 to 2022, Fukunaga served on the Honolulu City Council. She returned to the Hawaii Senate in 2022.

Hawaii House of Representatives
Preceded by Neil Abercrombie; Hiram L. Fong, Jr.	Member of the Hawaii House of Representatives from the 13th district 1978–1982; Served alongside: Charles T. Ushijima, Gerald de Heer, Brian Taniguchi	Succeeded by Frederick Rohlfing
Preceded by Russell Blair	Member of the Hawaii House of Representatives from the 31st district 1986–1992	Succeeded by Nathan Suzuki
Hawaii Senate
Preceded by Steve Cobb	Member of the Hawaii Senate from the 12th district 1992–2002	Succeeded by Gordon Trimble
Preceded by Brian Taniguchi	Member of the Hawaii Senate from the 11th district 2002–2012	Succeeded by Brian Taniguchi
Preceded by Brian Taniguchi	Member of the Hawaii Senate from the 11th district 2022–present	Incumbent
Political offices
Preceded by Tulsi Gabbard	Member of the Honolulu City Council from the 6th district 2012–2022	Succeeded by Tyler F. Dos Santos-Tam
