= Les Ihara Jr. =

American politician

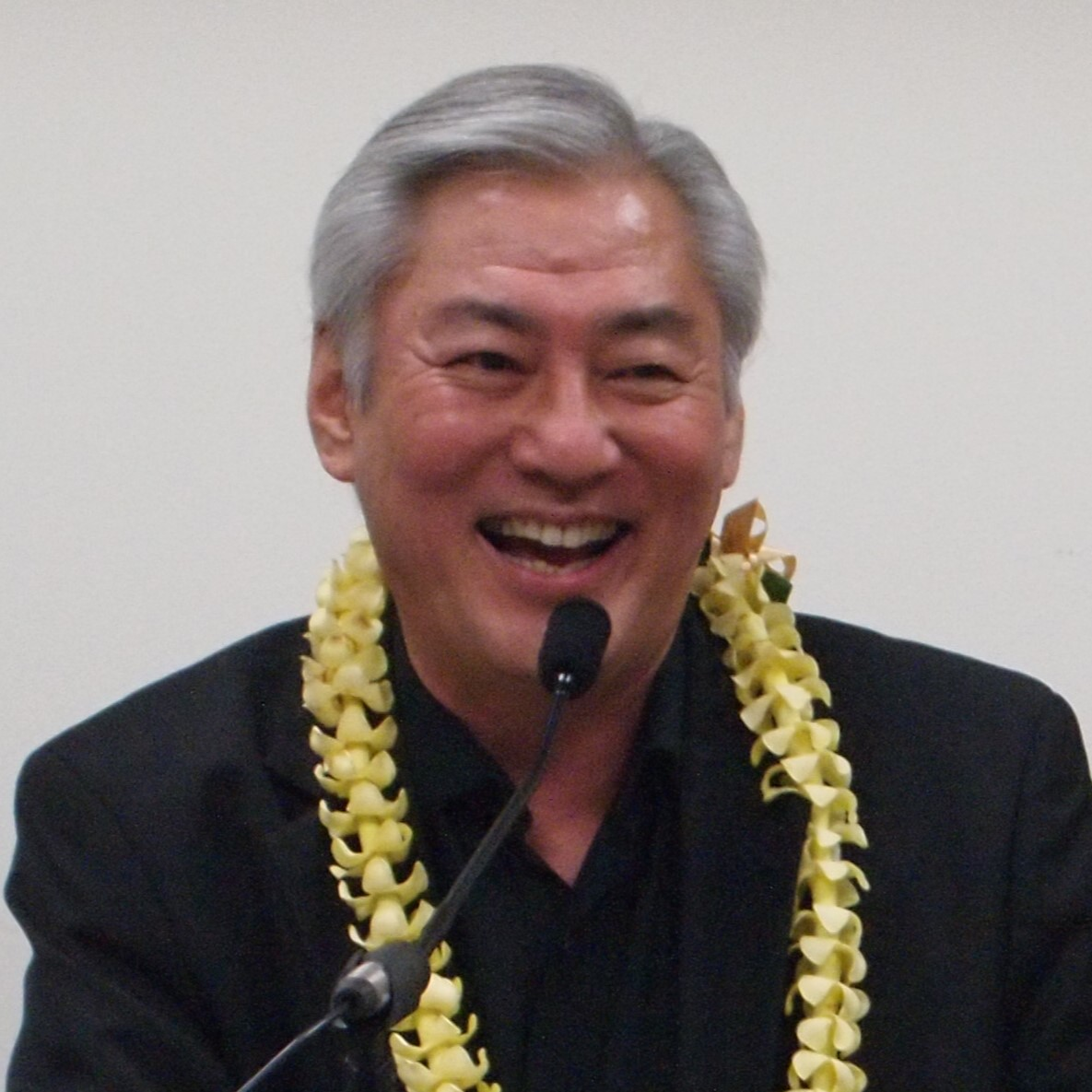
- Ihara in 2011

Member of the Hawaii Senate
- In office November 1994 – November 2026
- Preceded by: Bertrand Kobayashi
- Succeeded by: Jackson Sayama
- Constituency: 9th district (2002–2012); 10th district (2012–2026)

Member of the Hawaii House of Representatives
- In office November 1986 – November 1994
- Preceded by: Ken Kiyabu
- Succeeded by: Brian Yamane
- Constituency: 26th district (1986–1992); 19th district (1992–1994)

Personal details
- Born: April 19, 1951 (age 75) Honolulu, Hawaii
- Party: Democratic
- Education: George Washington University; University of Hawaii
- Website: lesiharajr.org

Les Seichi Ihara Jr. (born April 19, 1951) is an American politician. He served as a Democratic member of the Hawaii Senate from 1994 to 2026 in the District 9 and District 10 seats and in the Hawaii State Legislature from 1986 until 1994 in the Hawaii House of Representatives. With over 40 years of combined continuous service in the state legislature, by the end of his final term Ihara was the longest-serving incumbent lawmaker.

Ihara had been one of a small group of lawmakers who served as a delegate to the historic 1978 Hawaii State Constitutional Convention. In the Democratic primary of the 2026 Hawaii Senate election, Ihara lost renomination to state representative Jackson Sayama.

== Education ==
Ihara attended George Washington University and earned his BA in liberal studies from the University of Hawaii.

== Elections ==
- 1986 Ihara was initially elected the Hawaii House of Representatives in the November 4, 1986 General election.
- 1988 Ihara was re-elected in the November 8, 1988 General election.
- 1990 Ihara was re-elected in the November 6, 1990 General election.
- 1992 Ihara won the House District 19 September 19, 1992 Democratic Primary with 2,583 votes (67.7%), and won the November 3, 1992 General election with 5,971 votes (69.1%) against Libertarian candidate Merrielea Dolle.
- 1994 Ihara won the Senate District 10 September 17, 1994 Democratic Primary with 4,637 votes (65.2%), and the November 8, 1994 General election with 8,032 votes (59.5%) against Republican nominee Steve Colt.
- 1998 Ihara was unopposed for the September 19, 1998 Democratic Primary, winning with 2,362 votes, and won the November 3, 1998 General election with 9,241 votes (67.8%) against Republican nominee Darrel Gardner.
- 2002 Redistricted to District 9, and with Democratic Senator Matt Matsunaga running for Lieutenant Governor of Hawaii, Ihara was unopposed for the September 21, 2002 Democratic Primary, winning with 6,264 votes, and won the November 5, 2002 General election with 11,328 votes (61.1%) against Republican nominee Gladys Hayes.
- 2006 Ihara won the September 26, 2006 Democratic Primary with 6,666 votes (55.7%); his Republican opponent from 2002, Gladys Hayes won her primary, also, setting up a rematch. Ihara won the November 7, 2006 General election with 11,599 votes (72.3%) against Hayes.
- 2010 Ihara won the September 18, 2010 Democratic Primary with 7,841 votes (66.4%), and won the November 2, 2010 General election with 11,058 votes (64.7%) against Republican nominee Lisa Shorba.
- 2012 Redistricted back to District 10, and with Democratic Senator Brian Taniguchi redistricted to District 11, Ihara was unopposed for the August 11, 2012 Democratic Primary, winning with 8,595 votes, and won the November 6, 2012 General election with 13,703 votes (69.0%) against Republican nominee Eric Marshall, who had run for the seat in 2010.

== Affiliations ==
As of February 2025, he serves on the board of directors at the Kettering Foundation, an American non-partisan research foundation.
