= Glenn Wakai =

American politician

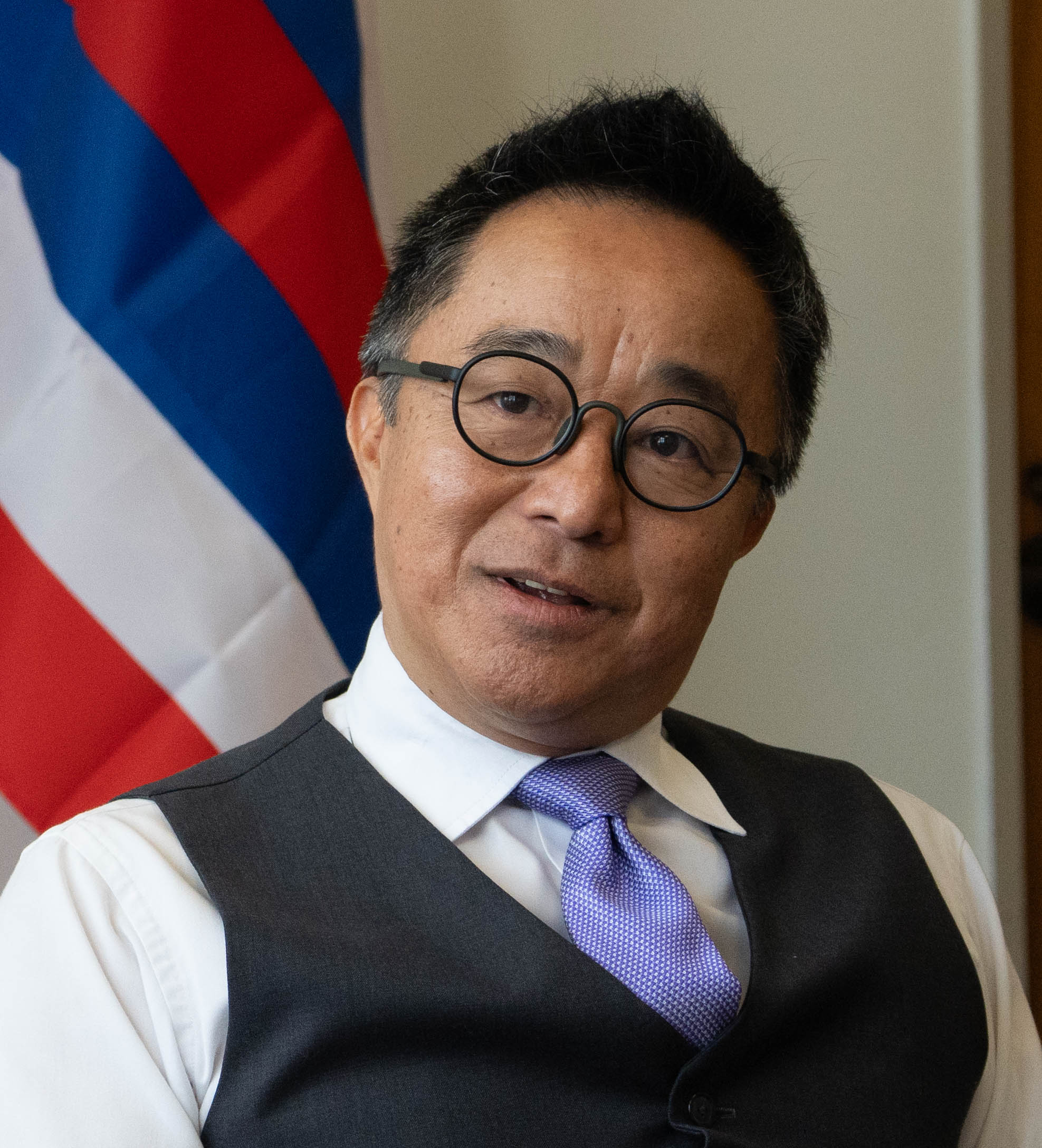
- Wakai in 2024

Member of the Hawaii Senate from the 15th district
- Incumbent
- Assumed office November 2, 2010
- Preceded by: Norman Sakamoto

Member of the Hawaii House of Representatives from the 31st district
- In office November 5, 2002 – November 2, 2010
- Preceded by: Nathan Suzuki
- Succeeded by: Linda Ichiyama

Personal details
- Born: May 14, 1967 (age 59) Tokyo, Japan
- Party: Democratic
- Spouse: Miki Wakai
- Education: University of Southern California
- Website: glennwakai.com

Glenn Satoru Wakai (born May 14, 1967 in Tokyo) is an American politician and a Democratic member of the Hawaii Senate since November 2010 representing District 15. Wakai consecutively served in the Hawaii State Legislature where he served from 2002 until 2010 in the Hawaii House of Representatives District 31 seat.

== Early life and education ==
Wakai was born as Mitsuru Shimabukuro in Tokyo, Japan. He was adopted when he was 18 months old by a Japanese American family in Hawaii, the Wakais. His birth mother, Yoko Boughton, came from a poor fisherman's family in Okinawa and was 16 years old when she gave him up for adoption. He is Okinawan.

Wakai attended public schools in Moanalua before graduating from Mid-Pacific Institute. He earned his BAs in broadcast journalism and sociology from the University of Southern California.

== Career ==
Wakai was a television newscaster in Guam, Saipan and Hawaii for a decade before entering politics.

=== Political career ===
Wakai was unopposed for both the August 11, 2012 Democratic Primary, winning with 5,478 votes, and the November 6, 2012 General election. When Democratic Representative Nathan Suzuki retired and left the House District 31 seat open, Wakai won the September 21, 2002 Democratic Primary with 1,975 votes (49.8%), and won the November 5, 2002 General election with 4,393 votes (58.2%) against Republican nominee Brad Sakamoto. who had been redistricted from District 6. Wakai was unopposed for the September 18, 2004 Democratic Primary, winning with 3,056 votes, and won the November 2, 2004 General election with 4,841 votes (59.7%) against Republican nominee Kaipo Duncan. Wakai was unopposed for the September 26, 2006 Democratic Primary, winning with 3,986 votes, and won the November 7, 2006 General election with 5,024 votes (76.7%) against Yvonne Perry. Wakai was unopposed for both the September 20, 2008 Democratic Primary, winning with 3,141 votes, and the November 4, 2008 General election. When Democratic Senator Norman Sakamoto ran for Lieutenant Governor of Hawaii and left the Senate District 15 seat open, Wakai was unopposed for the September 18, 2010 Democratic Primary, winning with 5,848 votes, and won the November 2, 2010 General election with 7,753 votes (62.4%) against Republican nominee Ben Pascua. Glenn Wakai is President of non government organization Reach Out Pacific.

In 2014, Wakai proposed SB3124 which attempted to establish Aliivibrio fischeri as the state microbe of Hawaiʻi. This was opposing state representative James Tokioka's bill from the previous year, HB 293 HD1, to establish Flavobacterium akiainvivens as the state microbe. Neither one succeeded. In 2017, legislation similar to the original 2013 F. akiainvivens bill was submitted in the Hawaiʻi House of Representatives by Isaac Choy and in the Hawaiʻi Senate by Brian Taniguchi.

In 2013, Wakai was appointed by Palau President Thomas Remengesau Jr. to serve as honorary consul for Palau to Hawaii.
