= Will Espero =

American politician

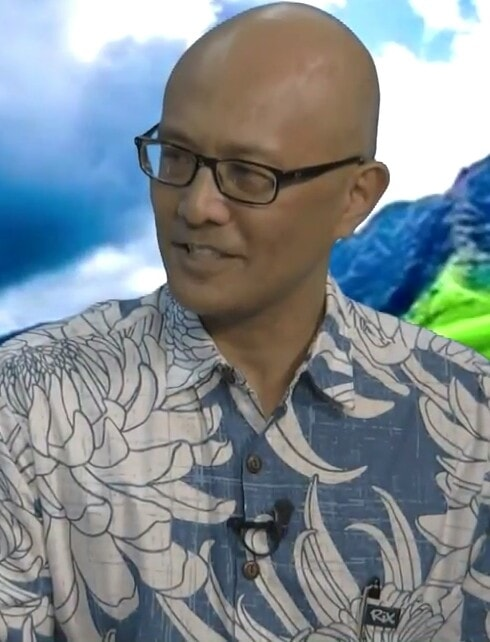

Vice President of the Hawaiʻi State Senate
- In office November 5, 2014 – November 10, 2016
- Preceded by: Ron Kouchi
- Succeeded by: Michelle Kidani

Member of the Hawaii Senate from the 19th district
- In office November 5, 2002 – May 31, 2018
- Preceded by: Redistricted
- Succeeded by: Jon Yoshimura

Member of the Hawaii House of Representatives from the 41st district
- In office December 1999 – November 5, 2002
- Appointed by: Ben Cayetano
- Preceded by: Paul T. Oshiro
- Succeeded by: Jon Karamatsu

Personal details
- Born: November 6, 1960 (age 65) Yokosuka, Japan
- Party: Democratic
- Children: Sean, Jason, Jasmine Tiana
- Education: Seattle University (BS, 1982)

William Calip Espero (born November 6, 1960) is an American politician who served as a state senator for the 19th district of the State of Hawaiʻi from 2002 until 2018. He is a member of the Democratic Party.

== Early life and education ==
Born on November 6, 1960, at a United States naval base in Yokosuka, Japan, Espero is the son of Victor and Paulina Espero. Originally from Bacnotan, La Union, Philippines, Victor served in the United States Navy for 21 years while his wife, Paulina, originally from Santiago, Ilocos Sur, Philippines, retired as a licensed practical nurse. As entrepreneurs, Victor and Paulina also operated a restaurant, catering service, and carehomes.

Growing up in a military family, Espero lived in Vallejo, California, Jacksonville, Florida, Athens, Georgia, Norfolk, Virginia, Oak Harbor, Washington, Guantanamo Bay, Cuba, Naples, Italy, and Yokosuka, Japan.

Espero attended Seattle University where he received his Bachelor of Science in Business Management in 1982. Later that year, he moved to Hawaiʻi and established a home. He worked in the finance and banking industry, property management, local home development, and the Coalition for a Drug Free Hawaiʻi. A few years later in 1987, he entered politics, working with former mayor Frank Fasi and his administration as the executive secretary of the City and County of Honolulu Neighborhood Commission.

== Political career ==
From 1987 to 1994, Will Espero was an appointee of Mayor Frank Fasi. He was the executive secretary of the Neighborhood Commission in charge of Oahu's Neighborhood Boards.

In December 1999, Espero was appointed to the Hawaiʻi State House of Representatives by Governor Ben Cayetano to fill the vacancy left by the resignation of then-representative Paul Oshiro. In 2002, he ran a successful campaign and was elected into the Hawaiʻi State Senate. He represented District 20, which stretched from lower Waipahu to ʻEwa Beach, where Espero resides. After the reapportionment of Hawaiʻi's districts, Espero became the senator for District 19 which now includes 'Ewa Beach, Ocean Pointe, 'Ewa by Gentry, Iroquois Point, and a portion of 'Ewa Villages.

Espero had formerly served as the Vice President of the Hawaiʻi Senate. He had also served as the Majority Floor Leader and Chairman of the Committee on Public Safety, Intergovernmental and Military Affairs (PGM). He was a member of both the Committees on Transportation and International Affairs (TIA) and Ways and Means (WAM).

Espero was instrumental in getting the Law Enforcement Officer Independent Review Board (2017) and the Law Enforcement Standards Board (2018).

=== Leadership positions ===
- State Senator, 2000–2018
- Chair, Senate Housing Committee, 2016–2018
- Vice President, 2015–2016
- Majority Floor Leader, 2010–2015; 2017–2018
- Chair, Public Safety, Intergovernmental, and Military Affairs, 2010–2015
- Co-chair, Transportation and International Affairs

=== Legislation introduced ===
- Act 094, SLH 2002 (main sponsor) - Hawaiʻi's version of Kelsey's Law
- Act 101, SLH 2012 (main sponsor) - creates opportunities for space tourism in Hawaiʻi
- Act 235, SLH 2012 (main sponsor) - appropriates funds for an advisory group for Honouliuli Camp Site, a World War 2 internment camp on Oahu, Hawaiʻi
- Act 070, SLH 2011 (main sponsor) - designates Gold Star Family plates to the family members of fallen soldiers
- Act 125, SLH 2011 (main sponsor) - requires persons convicted of violation of privacy in 1st degree & all persons convicted of promoting prostitution in 1st degree to register as sex offenders
- Act 027, SLH 2010 (main sponsor) - requires Office of Veterans Services to ensure the burial & inurnment of veteran's remains who is without immediate surviving family members
- Act 165, SLH 2010 (co-sponsor) - establishes the crime of intentionally or knowingly taking of a Hawaiian monk seal as a Class C felony
- Act 160, SLH 2009 (co-sponsor) - clarifies animal cruelty law by prohibiting the confinements & restraining of a pet animal in a cruel or inhumane manner
- Act 133, SLH 2008 (co-sponsor) - creates new misdemeanor offense of harassment by impersonation
- Act 164, SLH 2008 (main sponsor) - allows the Hawaiʻi teacher standards board to suspend a teacher's license when the teacher has been convicted of sexual offenses & to initiate proceedings to permanently revoke their license
- Act 127, SLH 2005 (main sponsor) - designates the path from Halawa landing to Waipahu as the Pearl Harbor Historic Trail

=== Community involvement ===
- 'Ewa Beach Boys and Girls Club, Board of Directors
- Friends of the 'Ewa Beach Library, Founder and president
- Friends of the Hawaiʻi State Art Museum, Board of Directors
- Mele Murals and Estria Foundation, Advisor
- Operation Homefront of Hawaiʻi, Board member
- Re-entry Collaborative Population Management, Board member
- State Council for Interstate Adult Offender Supervision, Board member
- West Oahu Economic Development Association, Founder and board member
- Workforce Development Council, Board member
- Clean and Sober Homes and Halfway House Task Force, Member
- Government Contracting Task Force, Member
- 'Ewa Beach Lions Club, Member
- 'Ewa Beach Community Trust Fund, Member
- Steering Committee of the Hawaiʻi Justice Reinvestment Initiative, Member
- Oahu Metropolitan Planning Organization Policy Committee, Member
- Correction Population Management Commission
- 'Ewa Beach Community Association
- 'Ewa by Gentry Community Association
- 'Ewa Neighborhood Board
- Hawaiʻi Fashion Month
- Hawaiʻi Impaired Driving Task Force
- Interstate Commission for Adult Offender Supervision
- Oahu Filipino Jaycees
- Oahu Going Home - Reintegration of Ex-Offenders

=== Awards ===
- Civil Air Patrol, Certificate of Appreciation
- 'Ewa Beach Lions Club, Distinguished Service Award
- Kanu O Ka'aina, Certificate of Appreciation
- Oahu Metropolitan Planning Organization, Certificate of Appreciation
- 'Olelo Community Media, Certificate of Appreciation
- USS Ronald Reagan, Honorary Naval Aviator on Board

== 2014 U.S. House of Representatives election ==
On Sunday, July 21, 2013, Espero announced his candidacy campaign for the 1st Congressional District of Hawaiʻi, the seat Hawaiʻi U.S. Representative Colleen Hanabusa vacated to run against Hawaiʻi U.S. Senator Brian Schatz. In the Democratic primary, Espero lost the party nomination to Mark Takai.

== 2018 lieutenant gubernatorial election ==
In September 2017, Espero tweeted that he would run for Lieutenant Governor of Hawaii. He lost the Democratic primary to his colleague Sen. Josh Green.

== Personal life ==
Since his retirement in 2018 from state government, Espero has written two novels. Passion In Paradise and Vengeance In Paradise are both novels about prominent Hawaii families involved in politics, business, love, and a lot of drama. He has also taken up acrylic painting with artwork displayed in the Pamana Art Exhibition 2023 at Honolulu's City Hall and the Matchbox Plus XIX Miniature Art Show (11/23-1/24 Cedar Street Galleries).
