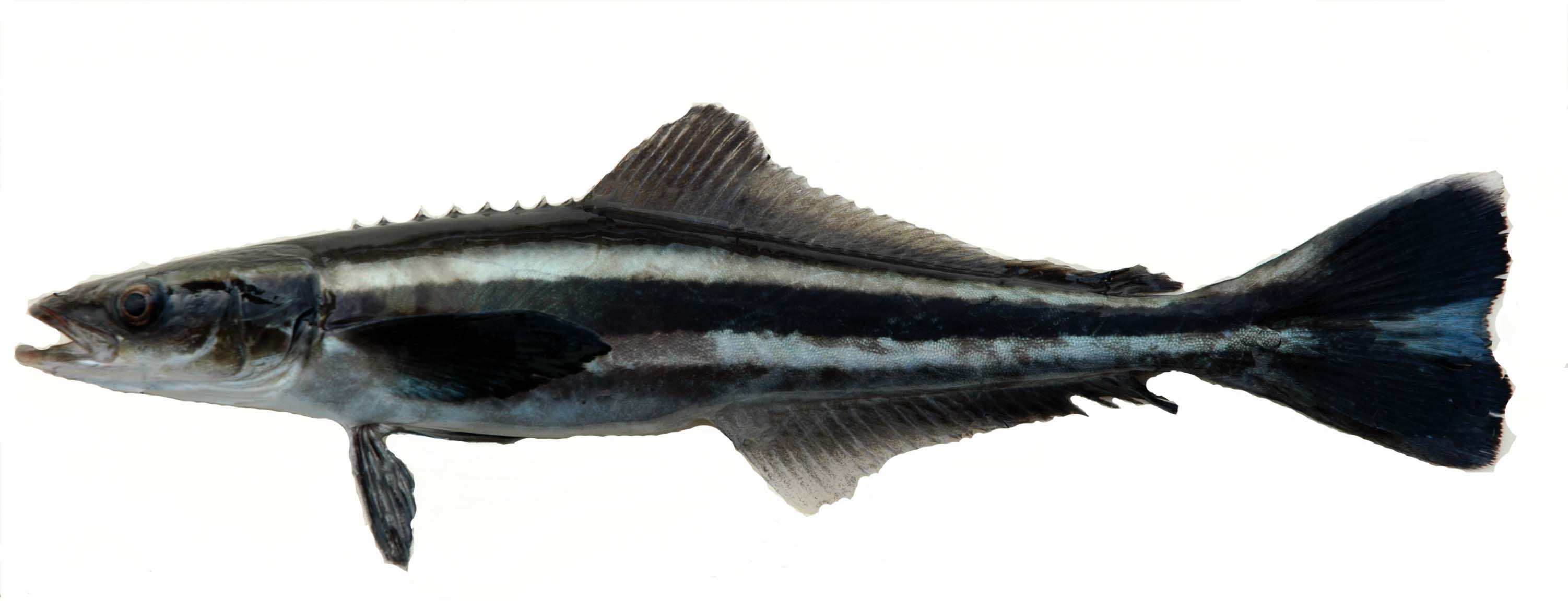
- juvenile

Conservation status
- Least Concern (IUCN 3.1)

Scientific classification
- Kingdom: Animalia
- Phylum: Chordata
- Class: Actinopterygii
- Division: Teleostei
- Order: Carangiformes
- Suborder: Carangoidei
- Family: Rachycentridae
- Genus: Rachycentron
- Species: R. canadum

Binomial name
- Rachycentron canadum (Linnaeus, 1766)

Synonyms
- List: Gasterosteus canadus (Linnaeus, 1766); Elacate canada (Linnaeus, 1766); Scomber niger (Bloch, 1793); Apolectus niger (Bloch, 1793); Elacate nigra (Bloch, 1793); Naucrates niger (Bloch, 1793); Centronotus gardenii (Lacépède, 1801); Centronotus spinosus (Mitchill, 1815); Rachycentron typus (Kaup, 1826); Elacate motta (Cuvier, 1829); Elacate bivittata (Cuvier, 1832); Elacate atlantica (Cuvier, 1832); Elacate malabarica (Cuvier, 1832); Elacate pondiceriana (Cuvier, 1832); Elacate nigerrima (Swainson, 1839); Meladerma nigerrima (Swainson, 1839); Elacate falcipinnis (Gosse, 1851); Thynnus canadensis (Gronow, 1854)

= Cobia =

Species of ray-finned fish

The cobia (Rachycentron canadum) (/ˈkoʊbiə/, KOH-bee-ə) is a species of marine carangiform ray-finned fish, the only extant representative of the genus Rachycentron and the family Rachycentridae. Its other common names include black kingfish, black salmon, ling, lemonfish, crabeater, prodigal son, codfish, and black bonito.

== Distribution ==
It is found in warm-temperate to tropical waters of the West and East Atlantic Ocean, throughout the Caribbean, and in the Indian Ocean off the coast of India, Australia, and the Pacific coast of Japan.

=== Introduced species ===
The cobia has been reported in various locations of the eastern Mediterranean Sea since 1978, following either entry via the Suez Canal or escape from mariculture. Juvenile individuals that escaped from offshore aquaculture in Ecuador in August 2015 have established cobia as an introduced species in the eastern Pacific, with subsequent spread north to the Pacific coast of Colombia and Panama.

=== Migratory habits ===
The cobia makes seasonal migrations. It winters in the Gulf of Mexico, then moves north as far as Massachusetts for the summer, passing Florida around March.

== Description ==
Attaining a maximum length of 2 m (78 in) and maximum weight of 79 kg (174 lb), the cobia has an elongated, fusiform (spindle-shaped) body and a broad, flattened head. The eyes are small and the lower jaw projects slightly past the upper. Fibrous, villiform teeth line the jaws, the tongue, and the roof of the mouth. The body of the fish is smooth with small scales. It is dark brown in color, grading to white on the belly, with two darker brown horizontal bands on the flanks. The stripes are more prominent during spawning, when they darken and the background color flashes.

The large pectoral fins are normally carried horizontally, perhaps helping the fish attain the profile of a shark. The first dorsal fin has six to nine independent, short, stout, sharp spines. The family name Rachycentridae, from the Greek words rhachis ("spine") and kentron ("sting"), was inspired by these dorsal spines. The mature cobia has a forked, slightly lunated tail, which is usually dark brown. The fish lacks a swim bladder. The juvenile cobia is patterned with conspicuous bands of black and white and has a rounded tail.

The previous largest cobia taken on rod and reel came from Shark Bay, Australia, and weighed 60 kg (135 lb). The new record for cobia certified by the IGFA weighed 79.6 kg (175 lb) and was caught near Rottnest Island, Australia.

The cobia resembles its close relatives, the remoras of the family Echeneidae. It lacks the remora's dorsal sucker and has a stouter body.

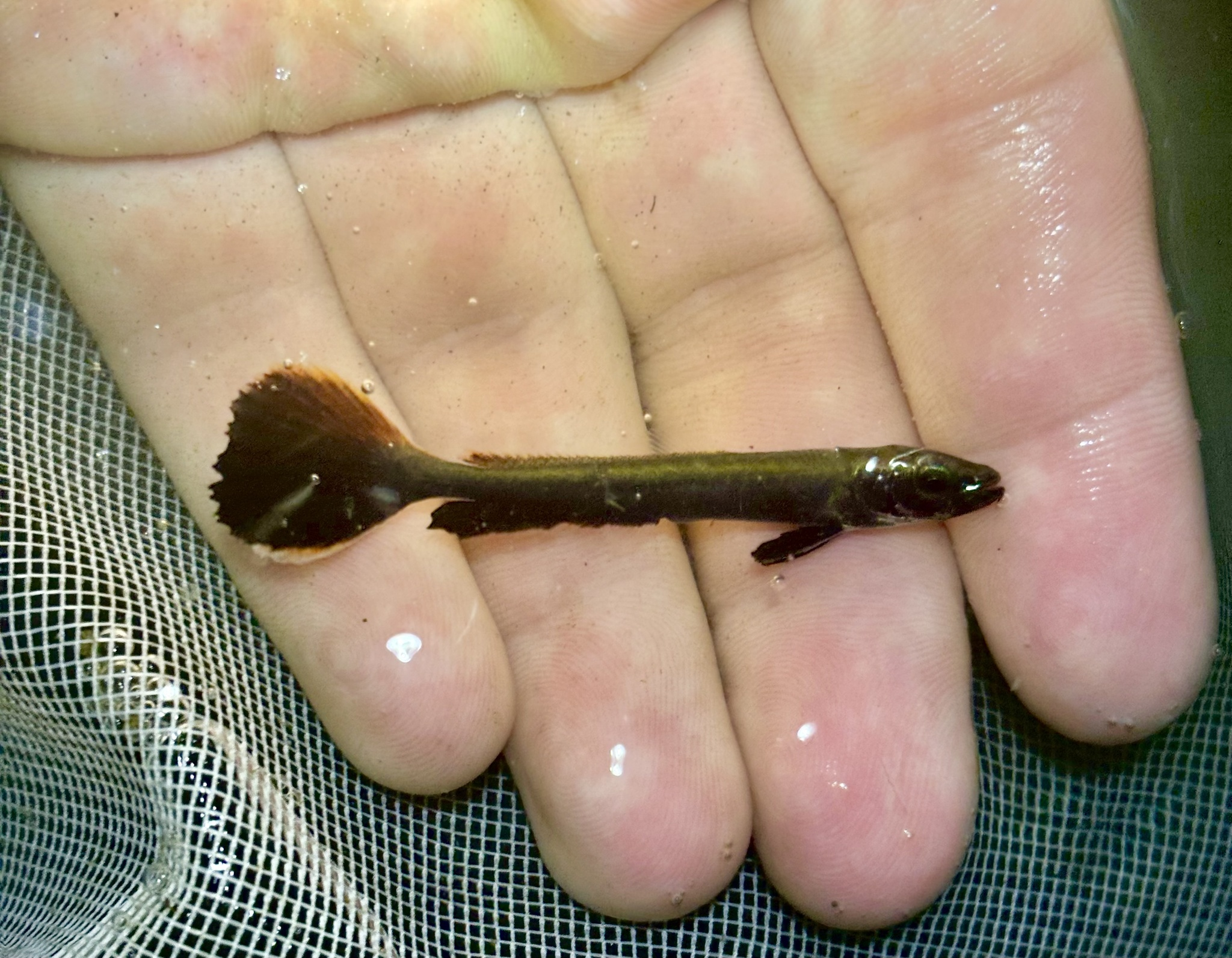
Young juvenile

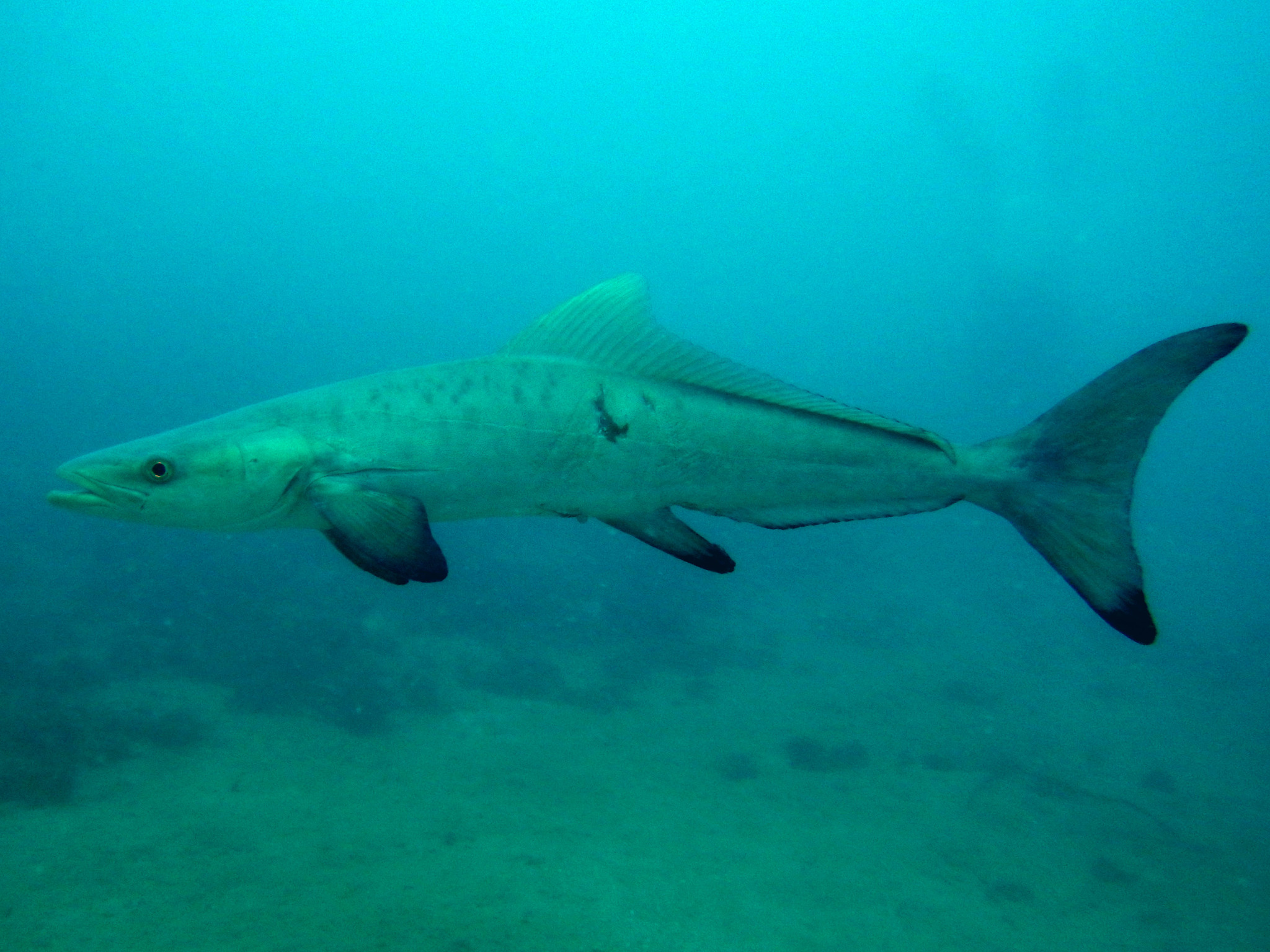
In Kenya

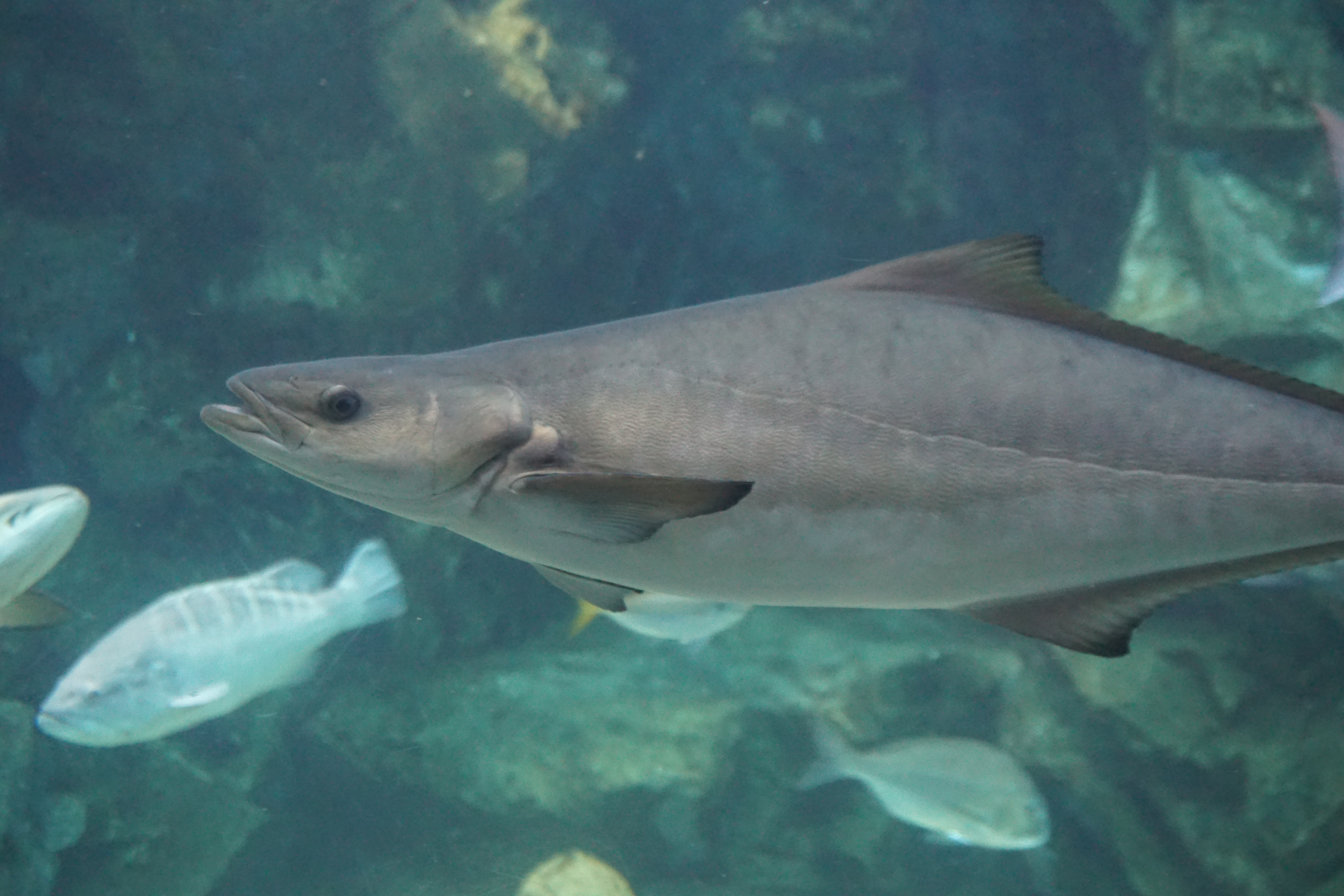
In an aquarium

== Habitat ==
It is eurythermal, tolerating a wide range of temperatures, from 1.6 to 32.2 °C. It is also euryhaline, living at salinities of 5.0 to 44.5 ppt.

The cobia is normally solitary except for annual spawning aggregations, and it sometimes congregates at reefs, wrecks, harbours, buoys, and other structural oases. It is pelagic, but it may enter estuaries and mangroves in search of prey.

== Ecology ==
The cobia feeds primarily on crabs, squid, and fish. Like its relatives the remoras, it follows larger animals such as sharks, turtles, and manta rays to scavenge. It is a very curious fish, showing little fear of boats.

The predators of the cobia are not well documented, but the mahi-mahi (Coryphaena hippurus) is known to feed on juveniles and the shortfin mako shark (Isurus oxyrinchus) eats the adults.

The cobia is frequently parasitized by nematodes, trematodes, cestodes, copepods, and acanthocephalans. Cobia are susceptible to multiple parasitic and bacterial infections such as Amyloodinium species, Photobacterium damselae subsp. piscicida and Lactococcus garvieae.

== Life history and reproduction ==
The cobia is a pelagic spawner, releasing many tiny (1.2 mm), buoyant eggs into the water, where they become part of the plankton. The eggs float freely with the currents until hatching. The larvae are also planktonic, being more or less helpless during their first week until the eyes and mouths develop. The male matures at two years and the female at three years. Both sexes lead moderately long lives of 15 years or more. Breeding activity takes place diurnally from April to September in large, offshore congregations, where the female is capable of spawning up to 30 times during the season.

While there are rare occurrences of intersex individuals (most likely due to endocrine-disrupting compounds in the water) they mostly have a fixed sex with a putative XX/XY mode of sex determination responsible for this.

== Culinary use ==
The cobia is sold commercially and commands a relatively high price for its firm texture and excellent flavor, but no designated wild fishery exists because it is a solitary species. It has been farmed in aquaculture. The flesh is usually sold fresh. It is typically served in the form of grilled or poached fillets. Chefs Jamie Oliver and Mario Batali each cooked several dishes made with cobia in the "Battle Cobia" episode of the Food Network program Iron Chef America, which first aired in January, 2008. Thomas Keller's restaurant, The French Laundry, has offered cobia on its tasting menu.

== Aquaculture ==
This fish is considered to be one of the most suitable candidates for warm, open-water marine fish aquaculture in the world. Its rapid growth rate and the high quality of the flesh could make it an important marine fish in future aquaculture production.

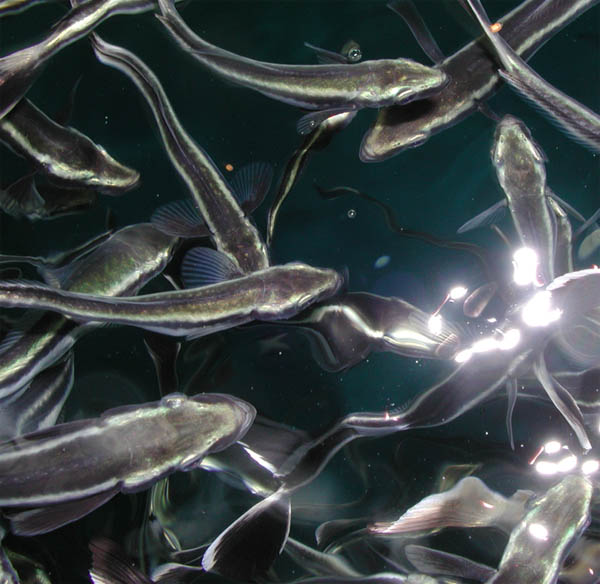
Cobia fingerlings at the University of Miami

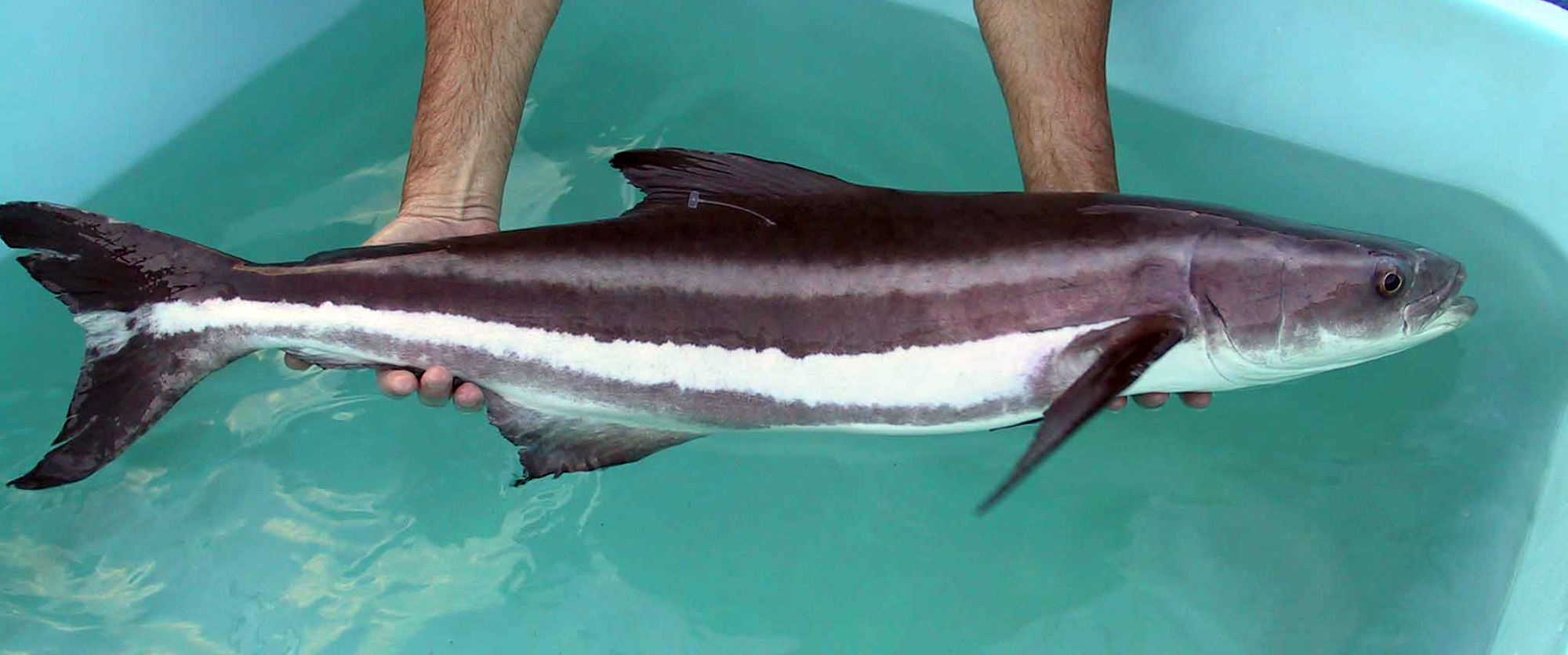
Female broodstock, about 8 kg, prior to transport to broodstock holding tanks at the University of Miami

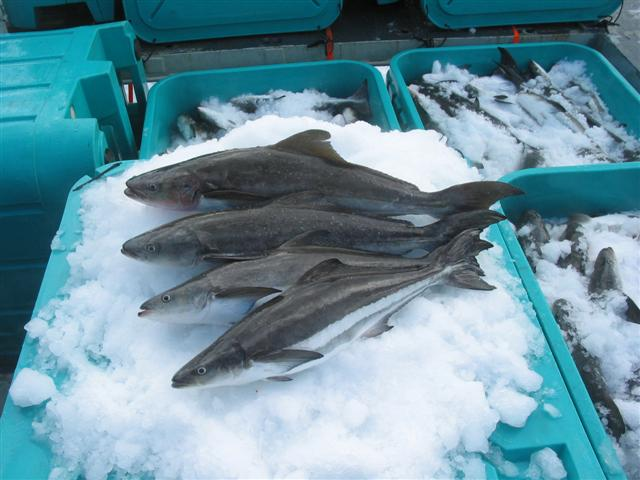
Cobia on ice at Open Blue Sea Farms

Currently, the cobia is being cultured in nurseries and offshore grow-out cages in parts of Asia, the United States, Mexico, and Panama. In Taiwan, cobia of 100 to 600 g are cultured for 1.0 to 1.5 years until they reach 6 to 8 kg. They are then exported to Japan, China, North America, and Europe. Around 80% of marine cages in Taiwan are devoted to cobia culture. In 2004, the FAO reported that 80.6% of the world's cobia production was in China and Taiwan. Vietnam is the third-largest producer, yielding 1,500 tonnes in 2008. Following the success of cobia aquaculture in Taiwan, emerging technology is being used to demonstrate the viability of hatchery-reared cobia in collaboration with the private sector at exposed offshore sites in Puerto Rico and the Bahamas, and the largest open-ocean farm in the world is run by a company called Open Blue off the coast of Panama.

Greater depths, stronger currents, and distance from shore all act to reduce environmental impacts often associated with finfish aquaculture. Offshore cage systems could become a more environmentally sustainable method for commercial marine fish aquaculture. However, some problems still exist in cobia culture, including high mortality due to stress during transfer from nursery tanks or inshore cages to the offshore grow-out cages, as well as disease.
