= Lytic chitin monooxygenases =

Chitin-cleaving proteins

lytic chitin monooxygenases

Identifiers
- EC no.: 1.14.99.53

Databases
- BRENDA: enzyme data
- ExPASy: NiceZyme view
- KEGG: enzyme entry
- MetaCyc: metabolic pathway
- Rhea: reactions
- PDB structures: RCSB PDB PDBe PDBsum
Search
- PMC: articles
- PubMed: articles
- NCBI: proteins

Lytic chitin monooxygenases (LCMOs) are proteins that cleave chitin. They have the EC (enzyme class) number 1.14.99.53 and primarily fall in the AA10 CAZy category, although they can also be found in AA11 and AA15. They oxidize chitin to cleave the bonds between sugars, leaving a lactone at one end that quickly hydrolyzes into an aldonic acid. As it oxidizes chitin, it reduces O_{2} to water. LCMOs are found across a wide variety of organisms, including Bacillus sp., Pseudomonas aeruginosa, Serratia marcescens, Tectaria macrodonta (a type of fern), and even Alphaentomopoxvirus acuprea. They are part of the larger group lytic polysaccharide monooxygenases, known for their activity on carbohydrates and their ability to cleave glycosidic linkages inaccessible to most other enzymes. LCMOs can have multiple functions, which is often host-dependent. They can act as a virulence factor to assist in breaking down chitinous cell walls to invade a host, can assist in molting for insects, or help break down a food source into more digestible compounds.These functions indicate LCMOs can help pull carbon in for metabolism or help an organism become established in its environment.

== Reaction ==
Lytic chitin monooxygenase reaction. Chitin is cleaved, leaving a lactone on one end. Oxygen oxidizes a substrate and is reduced to water. Image created on ChemDraw, recreated from Brenda.

The enzyme can use multiple substrates, but generally cleaves chitin at the 1,4 bond, leaving a lactone at one end. Oxygen is reduced to water and a substrate is oxidized. The full reaction is [(1→4)-N-acetyl-β-D-glucosaminyl](m+n) + reduced acceptor + O2 = [(1→4)-N-acetyl-β-D-glucosaminyl](m-1)-(1→4)-2-(acetylamino)-2-deoxy-D-glucono-1,5-lactone + [(1→4)-N-acetyl-β-D-glucosaminyl]n + acceptor + H_{2}O.

== Enzyme classification ==
In the enzyme class number 1.14.99.53, the 1 is for oxidoreductase, meaning a redox active enzyme. The 14 is for oxidoreductases with two hydrogen donors, with oxygen getting incorporated into one or both donors. The 99 is for miscellaneous/second donor information not known (not found in other categories such as with NADH, 2-oxoglutarate, or iron-sulfur protein as donors etc.), and the 53 is for lytic chitin monooxygenases.

== Structure ==
Active site of AsLPMO10B, a chitin-active lytic polysaccharide monooxygenase from A. salmonicida.

There are many crystal structures of lytic chitin monooxygenases. One structure determined from Enterococcus faecalis was determined at a 0.95 Å resolution. It has a tryptophan cluster in the center and shares large similarities with other LPMOs, including a copper cation. Although the differences between LPMOs that use chitin and those that use cellulose as substrates are not well known, the general enzyme structure is similar between the two. A few amino acids changed near and around the active site can alter the activity to select chitin over cellulose or vice versa.

Typical hydrolases that cleave sugars require a polysaccharide chain to be removed from a crystalline lattice (like chitin) before they can use it. Lytic chitin monooxygenases can cleave the glycosidic bonds in chitin directly, however, because of their structure. The active site lies on a flat surface, allowing the enzyme to bind the chitin lattice without having to isolate individual polysaccharide chains.

CflaLPML10D, a chitin lytic monooxygenase from Cellulomonas flavigena, features two histidines and a phenylalanine in the active site.

The structures of lytic chitin monooxygenases generally have a beta-sandwich core of seven beta strands shaped into two sheets. In between the sheets is a histidine brace, consisting of two histidines that bind a Cu (II) ion. There is also an amino acid that coordinates the substrate, which can vary based on the desired substrate. For example, enzymes from E. faecalis and A. salmonicida have a glutamate, while C. flavigena has a phenylalanine. Beyond the beta sheets there are a few alpha helices and some less structured areas.

The beta sheet sandwich structure provides the active site with protection from the protein’s environment. The copper ion that coordinates with the histidines in the active site is kept away from the aqueous environment and can be used for catalysis in the enzyme. The protein structure also puts the coordination amino acid (glu or trp above) near the copper ion to help ensure all substrates are in the proper orientation to interact and form products. The beta-sheet sandwich with a copper ion in the active site is common across LPMOs. Some of the aromatic residues near the active site likely protect the enzyme against reactive oxygen species that can be created when the enzyme is active.
