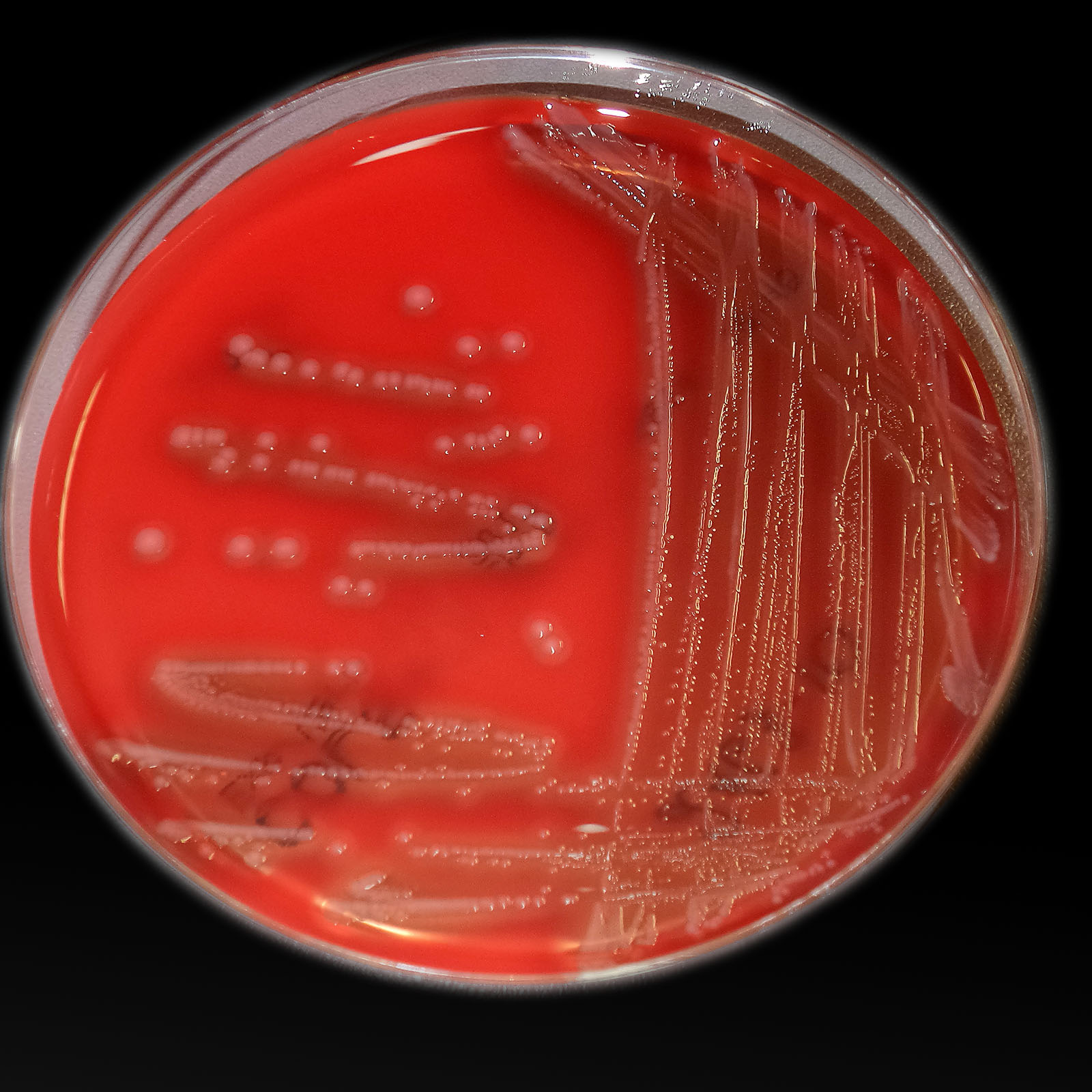
- P. d. subsp damselae on blood agar

Scientific classification
- Domain: Bacteria
- Kingdom: Pseudomonadati
- Phylum: Pseudomonadota
- Class: Gammaproteobacteria
- Order: Vibrionales
- Family: Vibrionaceae
- Genus: Photobacterium
- Species: P. damselae
- Subspecies: P. d. subsp. damselae

Trinomial name
- Photobacterium damselae subsp. damselae Smith et al. 1991

Synonyms
- Vibrio damsela; Listonella damsela

= Photobacterium damselae subsp. damselae =

Subspecies of rod-shaped bacterium

Photobacterium damselae subsp. damselae (previously known as Vibrio damsela) is a halophilic gram-negative rod-shaped bacterium. Commonly found in marine environments, P.d. subsp. damselae can cause disease in many species of marine wildlife and is an emerging threat in aquaculture. In humans Photobacterium damselae subsp. damselae can cause severe infections. The type strain of Photobacterium damselae subsp damselae is ATCC 33539T.

== Taxonomy ==
In 1971 a novel marine bacterium was isolated from a patient with an infected wound. The same organism was recovered in 1981 from the skin ulcers of a blacksmith damselfish and it was subsequently named Vibrio damselae after the fish from which it was first isolated. It was briefly reclassified as Listonella damsela based on 5S RNA sequencing. The name Photobacterium damselae was proposed in 1991 when researchers found that the microbe shared several key phenotypic traits with members of the genus Photobacteria, namely the absence of a flagellar sheath and accummulation poly-β-hydroxybutyrate. Further phylogenetic studies found that Photobacterium damselae shared 80% DNA relatedness with Pasteurella piscida suggesting that both strains belonged to the same species. The two organisms were reclassified as Photobacterium damselae subsp. damselae and Photobacterium damselae subsp. piscida respectively.

== Characteristics ==
=== Culture ===
P. damselae grows readily on media used in clinical laboratories, including TCBS agar. On media supplemented with blood, P. damselae produces beta-hemolytic colonies. The degree of hemolysis can vary significantly between isolates.

=== Virulence factors ===
P. damselae subsp. damselae's virulence in mammals and fish is determined by a large virulence plasmid called pPHDD1, which encodes two toxins, damselysin (Dly) and HlyA_{pl}.

P. damselae subsp. damselae produces a heat-labile cytolytic toxin called damselysin (Dly). Dly is a phospholipase D with activity against sphingomyelin. This toxin exerts strong hemolytic activity in the erythrocytes across a variety of animal species. Dly and its gene (dly) are considered to play an important role in the virulence of this organism. This species also produces a small β-pore-forming-toxin called phobalysin (PhlyP). Multiple PhlyP come together as oligomers to form small pores on cells that cause potassium leakage.

In vitro studies suggest that P. damselae subsp. damselae can utilize heme, hemoglobin, and ferric ammonium citrate as sole iron sources.

== Pathogenicity ==
=== In humans ===
Photobacterium damselae subsp. damselae infections most commonly manifest as sepsis and soft tissue infections, especially when wounds are exposed to marine water. Soft tissue infections can progress into severe disease such as necrotizing fasciitis over a matter of hours.

In one case reported in 1996, a 64-year-old man reported to a hospital with a swollen red hand 14 hours after sustaining an injury while unhooking a saltwater perch. Despite extensive debridement and the initiation of empiric antibiotic therapy the man was later found responseless in his room. The man was pronounced deceased 36 hours after the initial injury.

=== In marine animals ===
Photobacterium damselae subsp. damselae has been isolated from numerous marine animals including bigeye trevally and rainbow trout. In vitro studies have found that the bacterium can be transmitted through the water.
