= Photobacterium marinum =

Scientific classification
- Domain: Bacteria
- Kingdom: Pseudomonadati
- Phylum: Pseudomonadota
- Class: Gammaproteobacteria
- Order: Vibrionales
- Family: Vibrionaceae
- Genus: Photobacterium
- Species: P. marinum

Binomial name
- Photobacterium marinum Srinivas et al. 2013

Species of bacterium

Photobacterium marinum is a gram-negative, oxidase and catalase positive, motile bacteria of the genus Photobacterium. Photobacterium marinum are commonly found in marine environment. S.I. Paul et al. (2021) isolated, characterized and identified Photobacterium marinum from marine sponges of the Saint Martin's Island Area of the Bay of Bengal, Bangladesh.

== Biochemical characteristics of Photobacterium marinum ==
P. marinum has an optimum growth temperature of 30 °C. Cells contain poly-β-hydroxybutyrate granules that are visible with transmission electron microscopy. Similar to other members of the genus, P. marinum is oxidase positive and catalase positive.

Colony, morphological, physiological, and biochemical characteristics of Photobacterium marinum are shown in the Table below.

Test type	Test	Characteristics
Colony characters	Size	Medium
Colony characters	Type	Round
Colony characters	Color	Creamy
Colony characters	Shape	Convex
Morphological characters	Shape	Rod
Physiological characters	Motility	+
Physiological characters	Growth at 6.5% NaCl	+
Biochemical characters	Gram's staining	–
Biochemical characters	Oxidase	+
Biochemical characters	Catalase	+
Biochemical characters	Oxidative-Fermentative	Oxidative
Biochemical characters	Motility	+
Biochemical characters	Methyl Red	+
Biochemical characters	Voges-Proskauer	–
Biochemical characters	Indole	+
Biochemical characters	H_{2}S Production	–
Biochemical characters	Urease	V
Biochemical characters	Nitrate reductase	+
Biochemical characters	β-Galactosidase	–
Hydrolysis of	Gelatin	+
Hydrolysis of	Aesculin	V
Hydrolysis of	Casein	V
Hydrolysis of	Tween 40	+
Hydrolysis of	Tween 60	+
Hydrolysis of	Tween 80	+
Acid production from	Glycerol	+
Acid production from	Galactose	+
Acid production from	D-Glucose	+
Acid production from	D-Fructose	V
Acid production from	D-Mannose	–
Acid production from	Mannitol	V
Acid production from	N-Acetylglucosamine	V
Acid production from	Amygdalin	+
Acid production from	Maltose	V
Acid production from	D-Melibiose	+
Acid production from	D-Trehalose	+
Acid production from	Glycogen	V
Acid production from	D-Turanose	V

Note: + = Positive; – =Negative; V =Variable (+/–)
