= Photobacterium profundum =

- Confocal image of P. profundum strain SS9 expressing a green fluorescent protein. Bar: 10μm

Scientific classification
- Domain: Bacteria
- Kingdom: Pseudomonadati
- Phylum: Pseudomonadota
- Class: Gammaproteobacteria
- Order: Vibrionales
- Family: Vibrionaceae
- Genus: Photobacterium
- Species: P. profundum

Binomial name
- Photobacterium profundum Nogi et al. 1998

Species of bacterium

Photobacterium profundum is a deep sea Gammaproteobacterium, belonging to the family Vibrionaceae and genus Photobacterium. Like other members of this genus, P. profundum is a marine organism and has two circular chromosomes. P. profundum is a gram-negative rod with the ability for growth at temperatures from 0 °C to 25 °C and pressures from 0.1 MPa to 70 MPa depending on the strain. It has a requirement for salt, is able to metabolise a wide range of simple and complex carbohydrates and has two flagella systems. Cells are rod shape, 2-4μm long and 0.8-1.0μm wide, with a single unsheathed flagella. This bacterium was originally isolated in 1986 from the Sulu Sea and there are currently 4 cultured wild-type strains of P. profundum, (strains SS9, 3TCK, DJS4 and 1230).

Photobacterium profundum strain SS9 has optimal growth at 15 °C and 28 MPa making it both a psychrophile and a piezophile. P. profundum strain 3TCK, isolates from San Diego Bay, grows optimally at 9 °C and 0.1 MPa and P. profundum strain DSJ4, isolated from the Ryukyu Trench off of Japan at a depth of 5110 m, grows optimally at 10 °C and 10 MPa. Based on 16S rRNA sequence P. profundum is closely related to the genus Vibrio, the most prominent species being the human pathogen Vibrio cholerae.

In strain SS9 it has been shown that several stress response genes are up regulated in response to atmospheric pressure, these include htpG, dnaK, dnaJ, and groEL. The types and abundance of fatty acid chains in the cell membrane also respond to changes in pressure and temperature. At low temperature and high pressure strain SS9 increases the abundance of mono- and polyunsaturated fatty acids. This has the effect of increasing membrane fluidity by reducing packing of the fatty acid chains which results in a liquid crystal structure in the membrane rather than a gel structure. The outer membrane protein OmpH has been shown to be up regulated at elevated pressures, the opposite is true for the outer membrane protein OmpL which is up regulated in response to low pressures.

In 2005 Vezzi et al. published the genome sequence for P. profundum strain SS9. The genome of P. profundum consists of a 4.1-Mbp circular chromosome, a 2.2-Mbp minor circular chromosome, as well as an 80-kbp circular plasmid. Strain SS9 has 14 ribosomal RNA (rRNA) genes on chromosome 1, and 1 on chromosome 2; this is the largest number of rRNA genes found in any bacterium. Chromosome 1 consists largely of genes which are essential for growth whereas chromosome 2 appears to be a large plasmid, which, on an evolutionary time scale, has gained several transposable elements. Within the genome of P. profundum there is a large number of open reading frames (ORF) which are unique to SS9 and not found in other members of the family Vibrionaceae.

The genome sequence also highlighted a full Stickland pathway for the fermentation of amino acids; this was the first time this pathway has been identified in an aerobic bacterium. Two complete F1F0 ATP synthase pathways (one on each Chromosome) are also present in this bacterium: this might explain its ability to produce ATP at both high and low pressure.

This work was followed by another paper in 2005 by Campanaro et al. which detailed microarray work comparing gene expression at sub-optimal, optimal and supra-optimal temperatures and pressure for strains SS9, 3TCK and DSJ4. Campanaro et al. showed that there are 544 ORF’s divergent or missing from the 3TCK genome and 562 ORF’s divergent or missing from the DSJ4 chromosomes when compared to that of SS9. This paper also highlighted that 3TCK lacks the lateral flagella system which is up regulated in SS9 at elevated pressure as well as the absence of 3 phage-related regions from 3TCK and 4 phage-related regions from DSJ4.

The transcriptional landscape of the wild-type DB110 strain and of the toxR mutant TW30 were investigated by means of next generation sequencing. ToxR is a transmembrane DNA-binding protein first discovered in Vibrio cholerae, where it regulates a considerable number of genes involved in environmental adaptation and virulence. In P. profundum the abundance and activity of this protein is influenced by hydrostatic pressure and its role is related to the regulation of genes in a pressure-dependent manner. Results obtained from RNA-seq experiments revealed a complex expression pattern with a group of 22 genes having expression profiles similar to OmpH that is an outer membrane protein transcribed in response to high hydrostatic pressure. Moreover, RNA-seq allowed a deep characterization of the transcriptional landscape that led to the identification of 460 putative small RNA genes and the detection of 298 protein-coding genes previously unknown. The genome-wide prediction of the operon structure, the transcription start and termination sites, revealed an unexpected high number of genes (992) with large 5’-UTRs, long enough to harbor cis-regulatory RNA structures, suggesting a correlation between intergenic region size and UTR length.

CSLM image of initial stages of biofilm formation in Photobacterium profundum SS9 using live/dead stains. Pressure = 28MPa Temperature = 15 degree C Bar = 10 micrometre

CSLM of Photobacterium profundum SS9 expressing GFP. Bar = 10 micrometre
