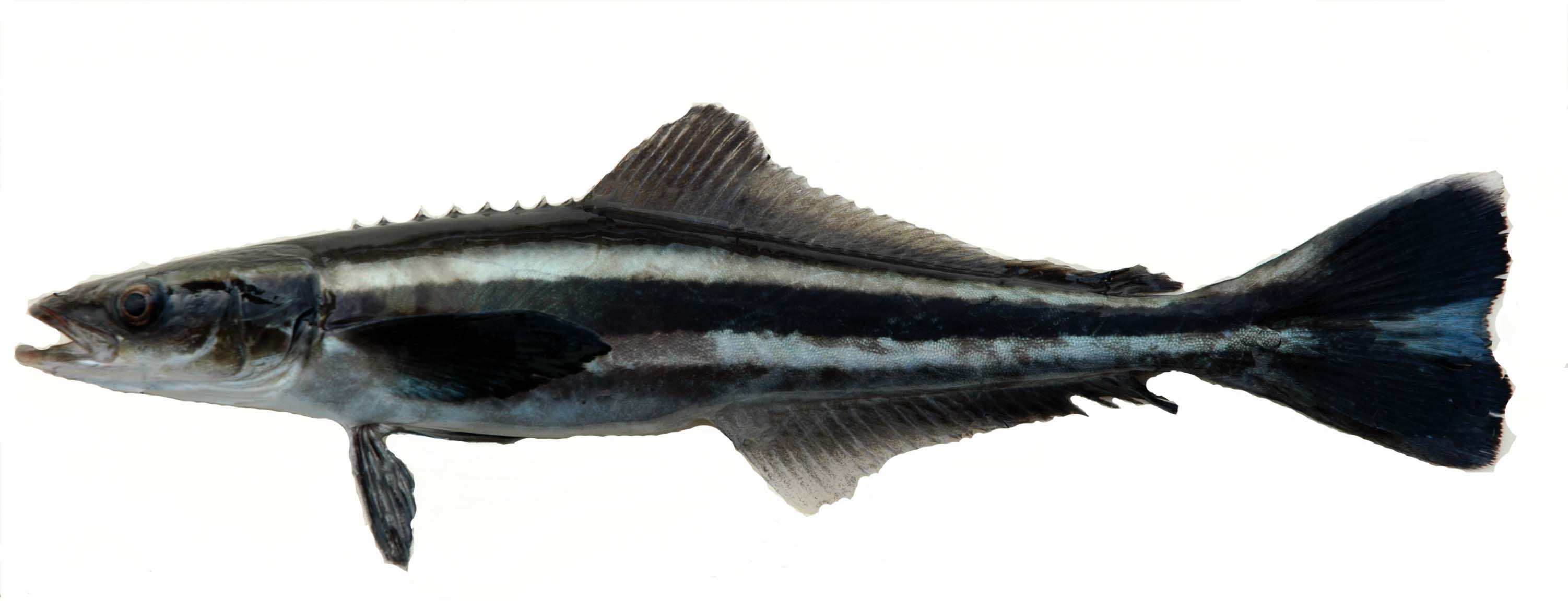

Scientific classification
- Kingdom: Animalia
- Phylum: Chordata
- Class: Actinopterygii
- Order: Carangiformes
- Suborder: Carangoidei
- Family: Rachycentridae; Gill, 1896
- Genus: Rachycentron; Kaup, 1826

Species
- Rachycentron canadum (Cobia); †Rachycentron stremphaencus

= Rachycentron =

Rachycentron Temporal range: Miocene–Recent

Genus of ray-finned fish

Rachycentron is the only known member genus of the family Rachycentridae. The genus contains a single living species, the cobia (Rachycentron canadum), and the Late Miocene fossil species Rachycentron stremphaencus from Maryland.
