= Photobacterium leiognathi =

Scientific classification
- Domain: Bacteria
- Kingdom: Pseudomonadati
- Phylum: Pseudomonadota
- Class: Gammaproteobacteria
- Order: Vibrionales
- Family: Vibrionaceae
- Genus: Photobacterium
- Species: P. leiognathi

Binomial name
- Photobacterium leiognathi Boisvert et al. 1967 (Approved Lists 1980)

Species of bacterium

Photobacterium leiognathi is a species of Gram-negative bacteria. The species is bioluminescent and a symbiont of ponyfish (family Leiognathidae).
