= Photobacterium phosphoreum =

Scientific classification
- Domain: Bacteria
- Kingdom: Pseudomonadati
- Phylum: Pseudomonadota
- Class: Gammaproteobacteria
- Order: Vibrionales
- Family: Vibrionaceae
- Genus: Photobacterium
- Species: P. phosphoreum

Binomial name
- Photobacterium phosphoreum (Cohn 1878) Beijerinck 1889 (Approved Lists 1980)

Synonyms
- Vibrio phosphoreum

Species of bacterium

Photobacterium phosphoreum is a Gram-negative, bioluminescent bacterium living in symbiosis with deep-sea marine organisms, such as anglerfish. It can emit bluish-green light (490 nm) due to a chemical reaction between FMN, luciferin and molecular oxygen catalysed by an enzyme called luciferase.

== Ecology ==
P. phosphoreum appears to be distributed worldwide in oceans and is found in a variety of different marine habitats. It was first isolated in 1878 from seawater, but has also been reported from the surfaces of fish and other marine animals, the intestines of fish, coastal seawater, and from a state of bioluminescent symbiosis with fish. P. phosphoreum colonizes a wide variety of deep-sea fishes which generally occur in the mesopelagic and bentho-pelagic zones.

== As a bioindicator ==
P. phosphoreum is the most frequently used luminescent bacterium in water quality assessment.
