= Photobacterium damselae subsp. piscicida =

Scientific classification
- Domain: Bacteria
- Kingdom: Pseudomonadati
- Phylum: Pseudomonadota
- Class: Gammaproteobacteria
- Order: Vibrionales
- Family: Vibrionaceae
- Genus: Photobacterium
- Species: P. damselae
- Subspecies: P. d. subsp. piscicida

Trinomial name
- Photobacterium damselae subsp. piscicida (ex Janssen and Surgalla 1968) Gauthier et al. 1995

Subspecies of bacterium

Photobacterium damselae subsp. piscicida (previously known as Pasteurella piscicida) is a gram-negative rod-shaped bacterium that causes disease in fish.

== Hosts ==
Hosts of Photobacterium damselae subsp. piscicida include:

- Barramundi/Asian sea bass (Lates calcarifer)

== Disease ==
Pasteurellosis is also described as photobacteriosis (due to the change in the taxonomic position), caused by this halophilic bacterium. It was first isolated in mortalities occurring in natural populations of white perch (Morone americana) and striped bass (M. saxatilis) in 1963 in Chesapeake Bay, USA (Snieszko et al., 1964). Since 1969, this disease has been one of the most important in Japan, affecting mainly yellowtail (Seriola quinqueradiata) (Kusuda & Yamaoka, 1972). From 1990 it has caused economic losses in different European countries including France (Baudin-Laurencin et al., 1991), Italy (Ceschia et al., 1991), Spain (Toranzo et al., 1991), Greece (Bakopoulos et al., 1995), Turkey (Canand et al., 1996), Portugal (Baptista et al., 1996) and Malta (Bakopoulos et al., 1997). Gilthead sea bream (Sparus aurata), seabass (Dicentrarchus labrax) and sole (Solea spp.) are the most affected species in Europe Mediterranean countries, as well as hybrid striped bass (M. saxatilis x M. chrysops) in the USA. However, the natural hosts of the pathogen are a wide variety of marine fish (Romalde & Magariños, 1997).

This pathology is temperature dependent and occurs usually when water temperatures rise above 18-20 °C. Below this temperature, fish can harbour the pathogen as subclinical infection and become carriers for long time periods (Romalde, 2002).

== Symptoms ==
Pastereullosis is also known as pseudotubercullosis because it is characterized by the presence, in the chronic form of the disease, of creamy-white granulomatous nodules or whitish tubercules in several internal organs, composed of masses of bacterial cells, epithelial cells, and fibroblasts. The nodules are most prominent in internal viscera, particularly kidney and spleen, and the infection is accompanied by widespread internal necrosis (Evelyn, 1996; Romalde, 2002; Barnes et al., 2005). Anorexia with darkening of the skin as well as focused necrosis of the gills are the only external clinical signs often observed. These lesions are generally missing in the acute form. The disease is difficult to eradicate with antibiotic treatments, and there is evidence that carriers under stressful conditions could suffer from reinfection (Le Breton, 1999).

== Identification ==
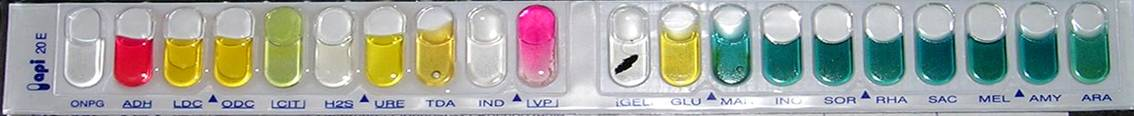
API 20E profile of Photobacterium damselae ssp. piscicida

Morphologically, the bacteria is a rod shaped cell, with no motility. Gram negative, with bipolar staining. The presumptive identification of the pathogen is based on standard biochemical tests. In addition, although Ph. damselae subsp. piscicida is not included in the API-20E code index, this miniaturised system can also be useful for its identification, since all strains display the same profile (2005004). Slide agglutination testing using specific antiserum is needed for a confirmative identification of the microorganism (Romalde, 2002).

== Virulence ==
The virulence of the pathogen implies the production of polysaccharide capsular layer, and extracellular products, and is also depending on iron availability (Lopez-Doriga et al., 2000). The bacteria spreads via infected phagocytes, mainly macrophages. This spread can be rapid, and lethal effects may occur within a few days of challenge, affecting tissues containing large numbers of the pathogens (Evelyn, 1996).

== See also ==
- Photobacterium damselae subsp. damselae
