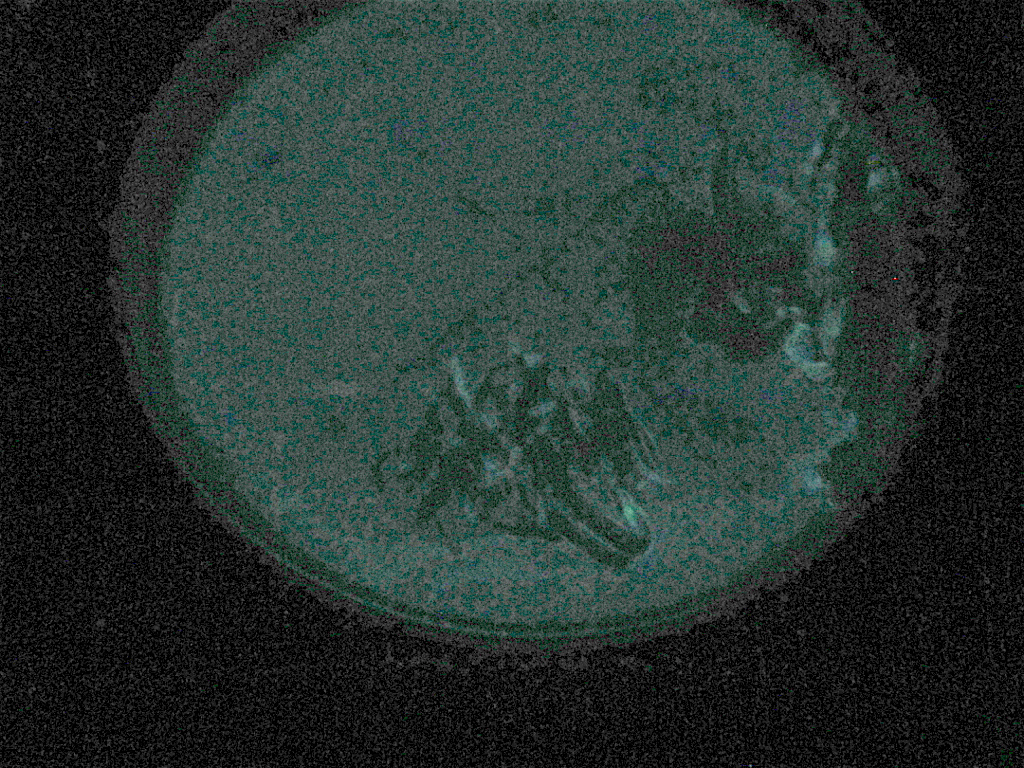
- Aliivibrio fischeri

Scientific classification
- Domain: Bacteria
- Kingdom: Pseudomonadati
- Phylum: Pseudomonadota
- Class: Gammaproteobacteria
- Order: Vibrionales
- Family: Vibrionaceae
- Genus: Aliivibrio; Urbanczyk et al. 2007 emend. Beaz-Hidalgo et al. 2010.

Type species
- A. fischeri

= Aliivibrio =

Genus of bacteria

Aliivibrio is a genus of gram-negative bacteria in the phylum Pseudomonadota.

== Etymology ==
The name Aliivibrio derives from: Latin alius, other, another, different; Neo-Latin Vibrio, a bacterial genus name, to give Aliivibrio, the other Vibrio.

== Species ==
The genus contains:

- A. finisterrensis ( Beaz-Hidalgo et al. 2010; Neo-Latin finisterrensis, pertaining to Finisterra, literally the end of the world (at least for the Romans who named the place). Galicia was the western end of the ancient Roman world.)
- A. fischeri ( (Beijerinck 1889) Urbanczyk et al. 2007, (type species of the genus).; named after Bernhard Fischer, one of the earliest students of luminescent bacteria.)
- A. logei ( (Harwood et al. 1980) Urbanczyk et al. 2007; Neo-Latin logei, of Loge; from German Loge, Norse god of fire and mischief.)
- A. salmonicida ( (Egidius et al. 1986) Urbanczyk et al. 2007; Latin noun salmo -onis, salmon; cida (from Latin caedo, to cut or kill), murderer, killer; salmonicida, salmon killer.)
- A. sifiae ( Yoshizawa et al. 2011; Neo-Latin sifiae, of Sif, the name of Norse goddess (Sif's hair was made of gold, and the name was chosen to reflect the yellow color of the luminescence).)
- A. wodanis ( (Lunder et al. 2000) Urbanczyk et al. 2007; Neo-Latin wodanis, of Wodan, the Norse god of art, culture, war and the dead, because its closest relative, Vibrio logei (Aliivibrio logei), also a cold-water vibrio.)

== See also ==
- Bacterial taxonomy
- Microbiology
