= Photobacterium =

Scientific classification
- Domain: Bacteria
- Kingdom: Pseudomonadati
- Phylum: Pseudomonadota
- Class: Gammaproteobacteria
- Order: Vibrionales
- Family: Vibrionaceae
- Genus: Photobacterium

Species
- P. angustum P. aplysiae P. carnosum P. damselae P. fischeri P. frigidiphilum P. ganghwense P. halotolerans P. histaminum P. iliopiscariumal P. indicum P. leiognathi P. lipolyticum P. logei P. marinum P. phosphoreum P. profundum P. rosenbergii

Genus of bacteria

Photobacterium is a genus of gram-negative, oxidase-positive and catalase-positive bacteria in the family Vibrionaceae. Members of the genus are bioluminescent, that is they have the ability to emit light.

Many species, including Photobacterium leiognathi and Photobacterium phosphoreum, Photobacterium ganghwense, Photobacterium marinum live in symbiosis with marine organisms. S.I. Paul et al. (2021) isolated and identified multiple strains of Photobacterium from marine sponges of the Saint Martin's Island Area of the Bay of Bengal, Bangladesh.

Species such as Photobacterium profundum are adapted for optimal growth in the deep cold seas making it both a psychrophile (an organism capable of growth and reproduction in cold temperatures) and a piezophile (an organism which thrives at high pressures).

== Biochemical characteristics of Photobacterium species ==
Colony, morphological, physiological, and biochemical characteristics of Photobacterium species are shown in the Table below.

Test type	Test	Characteristics
Colony characters	Size	Medium
Colony characters	Type	Round
Colony characters	Color	Creamy
Colony characters	Shape	Convex
Morphological characters	Shape	Rod
Physiological characters	Motility	+
Physiological characters	Growth at 6.5% NaCl	+
Biochemical characters	Gram's staining	–
Biochemical characters	Oxidase	+
Biochemical characters	Catalase	+
Biochemical characters	Oxidative-Fermentative	Oxidative
Biochemical characters	Motility	+
Biochemical characters	Methyl Red	+
Biochemical characters	Voges-Proskauer	–
Biochemical characters	Indole	+
Biochemical characters	H_{2}S Production	–
Biochemical characters	Urease	V
Biochemical characters	Nitrate reductase	+
Biochemical characters	β-Galactosidase	–
Hydrolysis of	Gelatin	+
Hydrolysis of	Aesculin	V
Hydrolysis of	Casein	V
Hydrolysis of	Tween 40	+
Hydrolysis of	Tween 60	+
Hydrolysis of	Tween 80	+
Acid production from	Glycerol	+
Acid production from	Galactose	+
Acid production from	D-Glucose	+
Acid production from	D-Fructose	V
Acid production from	D-Mannose	–
Acid production from	Mannitol	V
Acid production from	N-Acetylglucosamine	V
Acid production from	Amygdalin	+
Acid production from	Maltose	V
Acid production from	D-Melibiose	+
Acid production from	D-Trehalose	+
Acid production from	Glycogen	V
Acid production from	D-Turanose	V

Note: + = Positive; – =Negative; V =Variable (+/–)

== Taxonomy ==
There are currently 16 species with numerous subspecies known within the genus Photobacterium. The development of 16S RNA sequencing has led to many species being shifted into and out of this genus. Photobacterium can be distinguished from other genera based on identifiable characteristics.

== Identifying characteristics ==
- Morphological shapes are straight or plump rods
- Cell wall structure is classified as gram-negative
- Require sodium for growth
- Contain 1-3 polar flagella
- Are luminescent
- Incapable of forming resistant endospores
- Are chemoorganotrophs

== Ecology ==
Photobacterium are primarily marine organisms (hence the use of sodium for growth). They may be free-living or found as colonies associated with certain species of fish. These organisms do not contain any pigmentation and therefore will appear white or colorless. When there is a high density of cells forming a colony, they will exhibit fluorescence. However, the fluorescence is based on the accumulation of autoinducers which is proportional to cell density and therefore free-living photobacterium will not fluoresce. Their association with fish may be: symbiotic growth within fish for the formation of light organs, as a neutral entity on the surface or within the intestines of fish, as decomposers of dead fish, or as an agent of disease.

== Pathogenicity ==
Some of the 15 known species of Photobacterium have evolved into pathogens of marine life. Some of these diseases affect commercially important fish and can therefore indirectly impact human health through their consumption. This genus has been shown to degrade the chitin of the Deep Sea Tanner Crab (Chionoecetes tanneri). The species Photobacterium damselae are among the most virulent and are divided into two subspecies: piscicida and damsela. P. damselae subspecies piscicida is the causative agent of fish pasteurellosis. Bacterial colonies grow on the infected fish's spleen and kidney, eventually leading to mortality. This disease accounts for severe losses in some fish farming enterprises with some of the most susceptible fish including Yellowfin tuna (Thunnus albacares), certain Seabreams (Sparus spp.), Striped bass (Morone saxatilis), and White perch (Morone americana).

=== Photobacterium damselae subspecies damsela ===
Fish-virulent strains of this subspecies of P. damselae cause septicemia in species of fish such as; damselfish (Family Pomacentridae), eels (Anguilla anguilla), sandbar/brown sharks (Carcharhinus plumbeus), Yellowtails (Seriola quinqueradiata), seabreams (Sparus spp.) and turbots (Scophthalmus spp.). This subspecies has been shown to be pathogenic for humans as it has been isolated from human wounds and has been shown to cause primary septicimia in healthy humans.

=== Symptoms of Photobacteria damselae subspecies damselae ===
Fish infected by the subspecies damselae initially experience a reduced appetite accompanied by lethargicness and ulcerative lesions along their flank and head regions. Their stomachs will distend and they will experience extensive hemorrhaging especially in their eyes, mouth, and musculature. There will also be petechiation of the gills and liver along with the characteristic accumulation of mucus around the gills. It has been noted that the infected fish will swim violently a few minutes before death occurs.

=== Transmission/infection of Photobacterium damselae subspecies damsela ===
Evidence of epizootic outbreaks, gained from an increase in ulcers noted among the fish populations, seem to correlate to warmer seasons, suggesting a seasonal distribution in the incidence of the disease, dependent upon the waters temperature and salinity along with a decreased resistance caused by physiological changes experienced by the host during sexual maturity.

Seawater is the most likely mode of transmission of the virulent cells of the pathogen. Once it comes into contact with the outer surface of the fish, it is able to adhere to skin and resist the bactericidal action of the skin mucus layer, thus suggesting that the skin is the site of entry into the host. This bacterium could therefore represent a significant threat to aquacultured fish species, especially those living in crowded and stressed conditions, where the spread of the disease could be accelerated through direct contact and thus pose a threat to humans.

== See also ==
- Vibrio fischeri

== External sources ==
- Madigan, Michael T; Martinko, John M (2009). Brock biology of microorganisms (12 ed.). San Francisco, CA, USA: Benjamin Cummings. pp. 392, 423–425. ISBN 978-1-4058-2387-6. OCLC 762600999, 753429403, 803733371.
- Vezzi, A.; Campanaro, S.; D'Angelo, M.; Simonato, F.; Vitulo, N.; Lauro, F. M.; Cestaro, A.; Malacrida, G.; Simionati, B. (March 4, 2005). "Life at depth: Photobacterium profundum genome sequence and expression analysis". Science. 307 (5714): 1459–61. Bibcode:2005Sci...307.1459V. doi:10.1126/science.1103341. ISSN 0036-8075. JSTOR 3841724. OCLC 1644869. PMID 15746425. S2CID 21290953. (subscription required)
- "PHOTOBACTERIUM SPECIES". Archived from the original on June 18, 2013.
