= Aliivibrio salmonicida =

Scientific classification
- Domain: Bacteria
- Kingdom: Pseudomonadati
- Phylum: Pseudomonadota
- Class: Gammaproteobacteria
- Order: Vibrionales
- Family: Vibrionaceae
- Genus: Aliivibrio
- Species: A. salmonicida

Binomial name
- Aliivibrio salmonicida Håstein et al., 1978

Species of bacterium

Aliivibrio salmoncida is a species of gram-negative, rod-shaped, facultatively anaerobic marine bacterium in the family Vibrionaceae. It is the causative agent of cold-water vibriosis (Hitra disease), a systemic inection affecting Atlantic salmon (Salmo salar) and other marine fish. This species is adapted to low-temperature marine environments and is primarily associated with outbreaks in aquaculture systems in northern regions, particularly the North Atlantic.

== Taxonomy ==
The species was originally described as Vibrio salmoncida based on phenotypic and pathogenic characteristics observed in diseased salmon. Subsequent phenogenetic analyses using 16S rRNA gene sequencing and multilocus data supported its reclassification into the genus Allivibrio, which groups several marine, often bioluminescent, Vibrionaceae species.

== Morphology and physiology ==
A. salmoncida is a curved rod-shaped bacterium that is motile by means of polar flagella. This species stains Gram-negative and possesses a diderm cell envelope typical of members of the class Gammaproteobacteria. The bacterium is oxidase-positive, catalase positive, and exhibits metabolic traits consistent with marine Vibrionaceae, including a requirement for sodium ions.

The organism is facultatively anaerobic and capable of both respiratory and fermentative metabolism depending on oxygen availability. In laboratory conditions, this bacterium has a low optimal growth temperature (typically 4-12 °C), consistent with its ecological adaptation to cold marine environments.

== Genome and host adaptation ==
The genome of A. salmoncida has been sequenced and is characterized by a high number of insertion sequences and pseudogenes, indicating extensive genome decay. Many genes involved in environmental survival and metabolic flexibility are disrupted, consistent with specialization toward a host-associated lifestyle. Comparative analyses have shown loss or inactivation of pathways commonly retained in free-living Vibrionaceae.

One of the pathways disrupted in A. salmonicida are those associated with chitin degradation and utilization, pathways that are typically conserved in environmental Vibrionaceae. In related marine bacteria, chitin serves as both a nutrient source and a surface for environmental persistence. Subsequent work demonstrated that some strains of A. salmoncida are able to degrade and metabolize chitin and utilize it as a carbon source despite not possessing a full chitinolytic pathway.

== Virulence & pathogenesis ==
Cold-water vibriosis is a systemic infection characterized by rapid dissemination of bacteria following entry into the host. Experimental infection studies have demonstrated spread to the bloodstream and internal organs.

The lipopolysaccharide O-antigen is required for full virulence, as mutants lacking genes necessary for O-antigen synthesis showed reduced virulence in Atlantic salmon. Flagellar components also contribute to pathogenicity. Deletion of dlagellar genes reduced virulence in immersion challenge models, although motility itself is not required for invasion.

== Disease ==
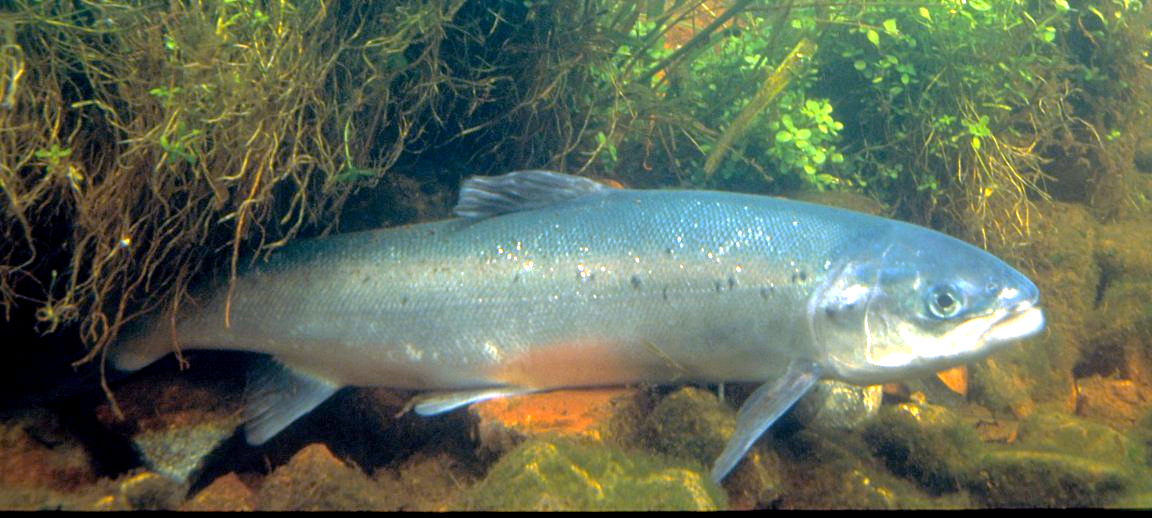
Atlantic salmon (Salmo salar) is commonly infected by A. salmoncida

Cold-water vibriosis (Hitra disease) is a systemic disease characterized by septicemia, hemorrhage, and high mortality in affected fish. Clinical signs include skin lesions, fin erosion, anemia, and internal organ damage. Histopathological findings include vascular damage and bacterial dissemination in multiple organs. The disease primarily affects Atlantic salmon but has been reported in salmonids and in cod.

Outbreaks are typically associated with low water temperatures and stress conditions in aquaculture systems. The disease was first identified in Norway and historically caused significant losses in salmon aquaculture prior to the introduction of vaccination.

== Control & prevention ==
Vaccination has been an important control measure against cold-water vibriosis in Atlantic salmon aquaculture. A 1991 field study reported that Atlantic salmon vaccinated against cold-water vibriosis were still protected up to two years after vaccination, although protection declined over time. The disease was considered as controlled by vaccination, but reappeared in Atlantic salmon farms in 2011.

Oil-adjuvanted bacterin vaccines administered by intraperitoneal injection are commonly used in farmed Atlantic salmon. These vaccines typically consist of inactivated whole cells, and protection is thought to involve both humoral immune responses and recognition of surface-associated antigens, including outer membrane components.

Additional control measures include management practices aimed at reducing stress and limiting transmission, such as maintaining appropriate stocking densities and minimizing handling.
